= Baarle =

Village divided into Belgian and Dutch territories

Coordinates: 51°26′N 4°55′E

	Baarle-Nassau	Baarle-Hertog
Country	Netherlands	Belgium
Province	North Brabant	Antwerp
Commune	Baarle-Nassau	Baarle-Hertog
Area	76.30 km^{2} (29.46 sq mi)	7.48 km^{2} (2.89 sq mi)
Population	6668	2592
Density	87/km^{2} (226/sq mi)	347/km^{2} (897/sq mi)
Time zone	CET (UTC+01:00), CEST (UTC+02:00)
Postal code	5111	2387
Area code	013	014
House numbers		
Website	baarle-nassau.nl	baarle-hertog.be
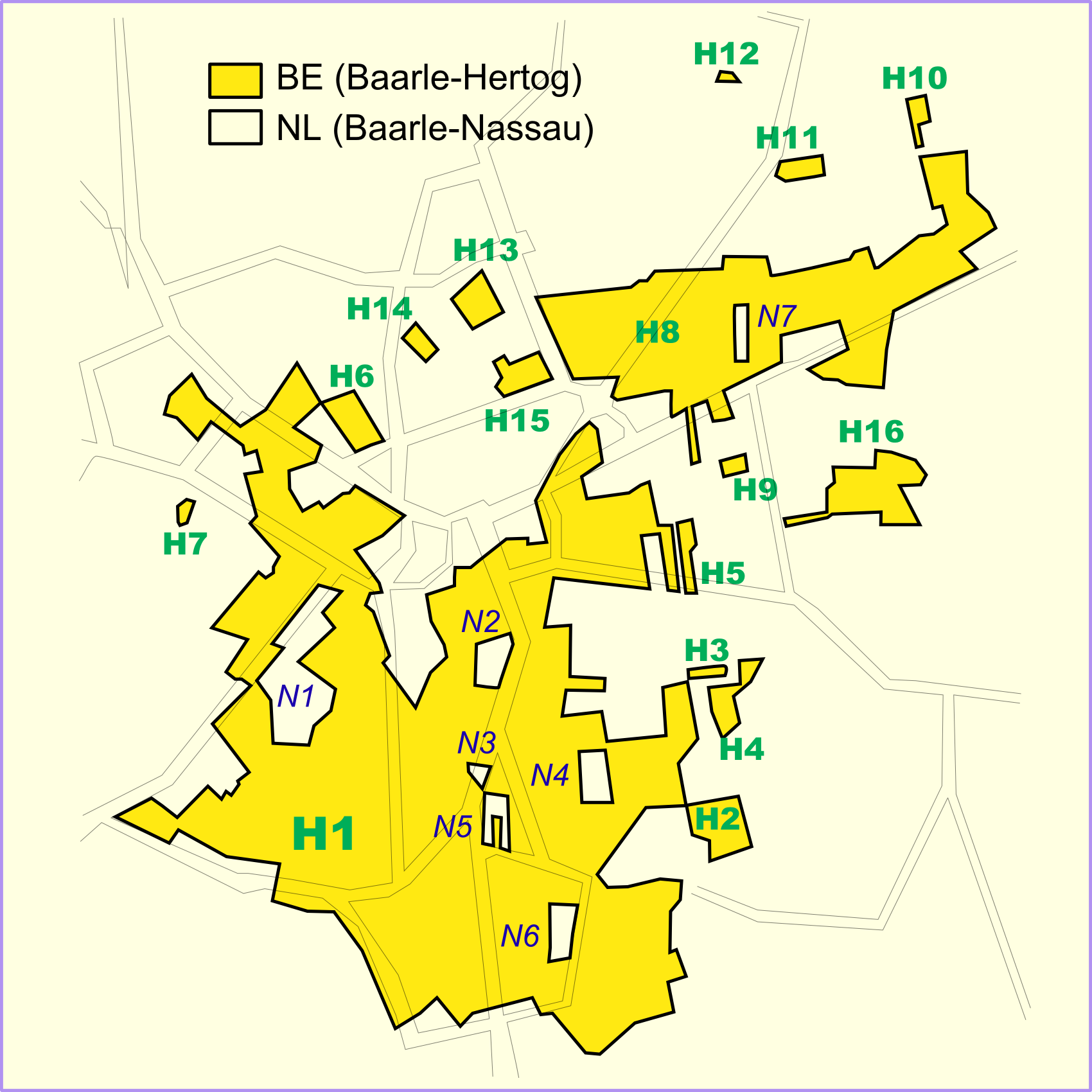

Baarle (Dutch pronunciation: [ˈbaːrlə]) is a village in Northwestern Europe which consists of a patchwork of Belgian and Dutch territories. The Belgian parts of the village are called Baarle-Hertog and the Dutch elements are called Baarle-Nassau. The Belgian part includes 16 exclaves within Dutch territory. The exclaves, in turn, surround seven Dutch areas. Belgian territory also surrounds an eighth Dutch area near Ginhoven. In 1995, the border was finalized to include a formerly neutral grassland. Baarle also includes a quadripoint shared by two of the exclaves.

The line of the border means that some buildings (for instance, a branch of the retail store Zeeman) straddle both countries. For these properties, the voordeurregel (literally: "front door rule") policy applies: their address lies in the country that contains their front door. The exception is a house on Loveren Street with both Belgian (No. 2) and Dutch (No. 19) house numbers, whose front door is on the border line itself. For convenience, every house number plaque shows a national flag.

== Toponymy ==
There are various theories about the origin of the name Baarle (referred to in old sources as Barle or Barlo). The last part certainly originates from the -loo suffix, which means forest on sandy ground, next to a settlement. The first part could be interpreted as:

- baar: a bare, flat or uncultivated land;
- *barza: a Proto-Germanic word for softwood;
- Baro or Bera, an old first name.

The suffixes Hertog and Nassau refer respectively to the Hertog (Duke) of Brabant and the House of Nassau which held the Lordship of Breda.

The name of the Tommel hamlet has its origins in the Latin word tumulus, meaning a burial mound, and there are a number of prehistoric tumuli in the vicinity. Urns have also been found around Tommel, evidence that this area has been inhabited since the Bronze Age.

== History ==
During the 12th century the area was marshland. In 1198, Henry I, Duke of Brabant (Dutch: Hendrick I) made over some of the land to Godfried of Schoten, the Lord of Breda. Hendrick kept the lands that were paying him a rent. The area that Hendrick kept is now part of Belgium. The area that was given to Gotfried is now in the Netherlands. The title Lord of Breda is now held by Willem-Alexander, king of the Netherlands. The title Duke of Brabant is now a courtesy title of the heir to the Belgian throne.

Baarle-Hertog and Baarle-Nassau each have a burgemeester (mayor). Each town has its own elected town council and each has a police station. Each town has its own church. In some areas the two town councils can cooperate. They have set up a joint council to look after things like electricity, water and gas supplies, highway maintenance and refuse collection. The border was only finally defined in 1995.

Both councils also fund a joint cultural centre that houses a combined library. The cultural centre has two official entrances. The international border passes through the building. The Dutch entrance is at 7 Pastoor de Katerstraat. The Belgian entrance is at 5 Pastoor de Katerstraat. The tourist office is affiliated to both the Dutch and the Belgian tourist boards.

Dutch trading law applies to the Dutch parts of the town and Belgian trading law applies to Belgian territory. Differences in the laws have long encouraged smuggling, but European integration, especially since 1993, has made it much less relevant. After the Second World War many people smuggled butter from the Netherlands into Belgium. In modern times many people still buy fireworks in Belgium and smuggle them into the Netherlands.

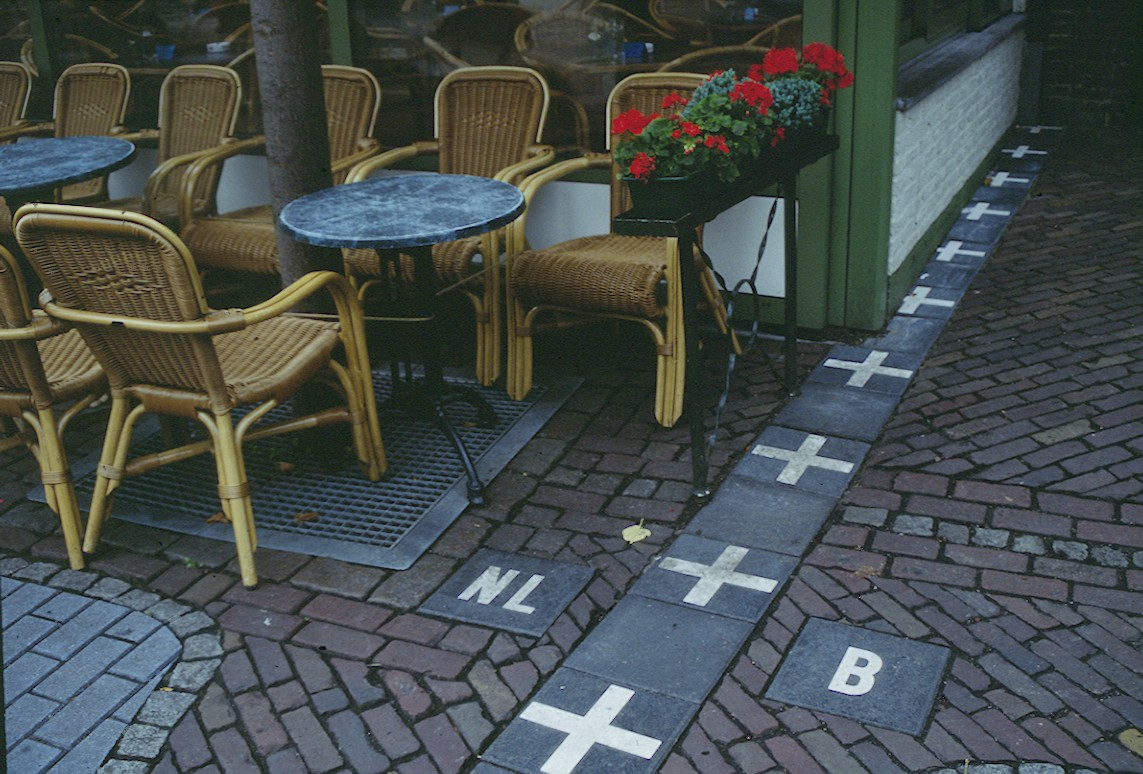
Café in Baarle-Nassau (Netherlands), on the border with Belgium. The border is marked on the pavement.

== Economy ==
The areas of Baarle-Nassau and Baarle-Hertog are essentially agrarian in character, although there is some industrial activity. The complex situation led to smuggling becoming a significant source of income in this area. The middle class also profited from the exceptional situation. There is an expensive and busy selection of shops. There are also numerous parks in the vicinity.

The population of Baarle, for the first decade of the 21st century, shows a downward trend.

== Geography ==
Baarle contains, alongside broad agricultural settlements, a number of natural areas. Merkshe in the south is a stream valley and the Hollandse Bossen ('Dutch Forests') in the west form an estate. Bels Lijntje, a former railway line, is now a bicycle path for tourists that runs from Riel to Turnhout.

== Utilities ==
=== Electricity ===
In Baarle-Hertog and Zondereigen the electricity is delivered by Eandis from Belgium. In Baarle-Nassau and its parish of Ulicoten the power is provided by TenneT from the Netherlands. The village of Castelré is powered by Eandis in Belgium.

=== Cable (radio, television and internet) ===
Until 2012, the Flemish company Telenet provided both Dutch and Flemish television to Baarle. Since then, Telenet may not offer more services to the Dutch section of Baarle, because the cable, which belongs to Eandis, was bought out by the Dutch company Reggefiber. They have locked the cable distribution and provide fiber to the Dutch network. That means that the Dutch area of Baarle is now serviced by Dutch providers (such as KPN, Tele2 and Telfort) which can provide service, but Flemish providers can no longer be used (such as receivers of Flemish commercial broadcasters, for example VTM).

In the Belgian area of Baarle there have been few changes. Telenet continues to offer service to the area, the Dutch commercial broadcasters (such as RTL 4) have removed the analogue cable offerings and these stations only provide digital reception. These are only available through cable (and thus through Telenet); other Belgian providers of radio, TV and internet are accessed via ADSL. They have no Dutch commercial broadcasters included within their package.

=== Gas ===
- Enexis (from the Netherlands)

=== Water ===
- Brabant Water (from the Netherlands)

=== Waste disposal ===
Many streets are visited by a rubbish collector twice per week (1× Dutch, 1× Belgian). The recycling centre on Smederijstraat can be used by the whole population of Baarle-Nassau and Baarle-Hertog.

=== Post ===
The mail is delivered by PostNL in the Dutch area and bpost in the Belgian area.

== Telephone ==
The telephone network is redundantly served by KPN and Belgacom, but with a special condition: calls between Baarle-Hertog and Baarle-Nassau are available at local rates. Also, mobile phones throughout Baarle can easily connect to cell towers from either country.

== Shopping ==
Due to legislation, there is an erotic video store in Baarle-Nassau and a fireworks store in Baarle-Hertog which is open the entire year. In Baarle there is Sunday shopping every week — because stores can always be open on Sunday in Belgium, and in Baarle-Nassau, many rely on the tourist attractions resulting from its enclave status.

== Emergency services ==
The police of Baarle-Hertog and Baarle-Nassau are located within the same office on the Parallelweg in Baarle-Hertog and are locally established. The local police officer of Baarle is sometimes called Dirco.

The fire services of Baarle-Nassau and Baarle-Hertog merged into a single body on 1 January 2010. The joint fire service is formed by Dutch and Belgian volunteers and the station is located at C.A. Bodestraat 2 in Baarle-Nassau.

== Transportation ==
=== Traffic ===
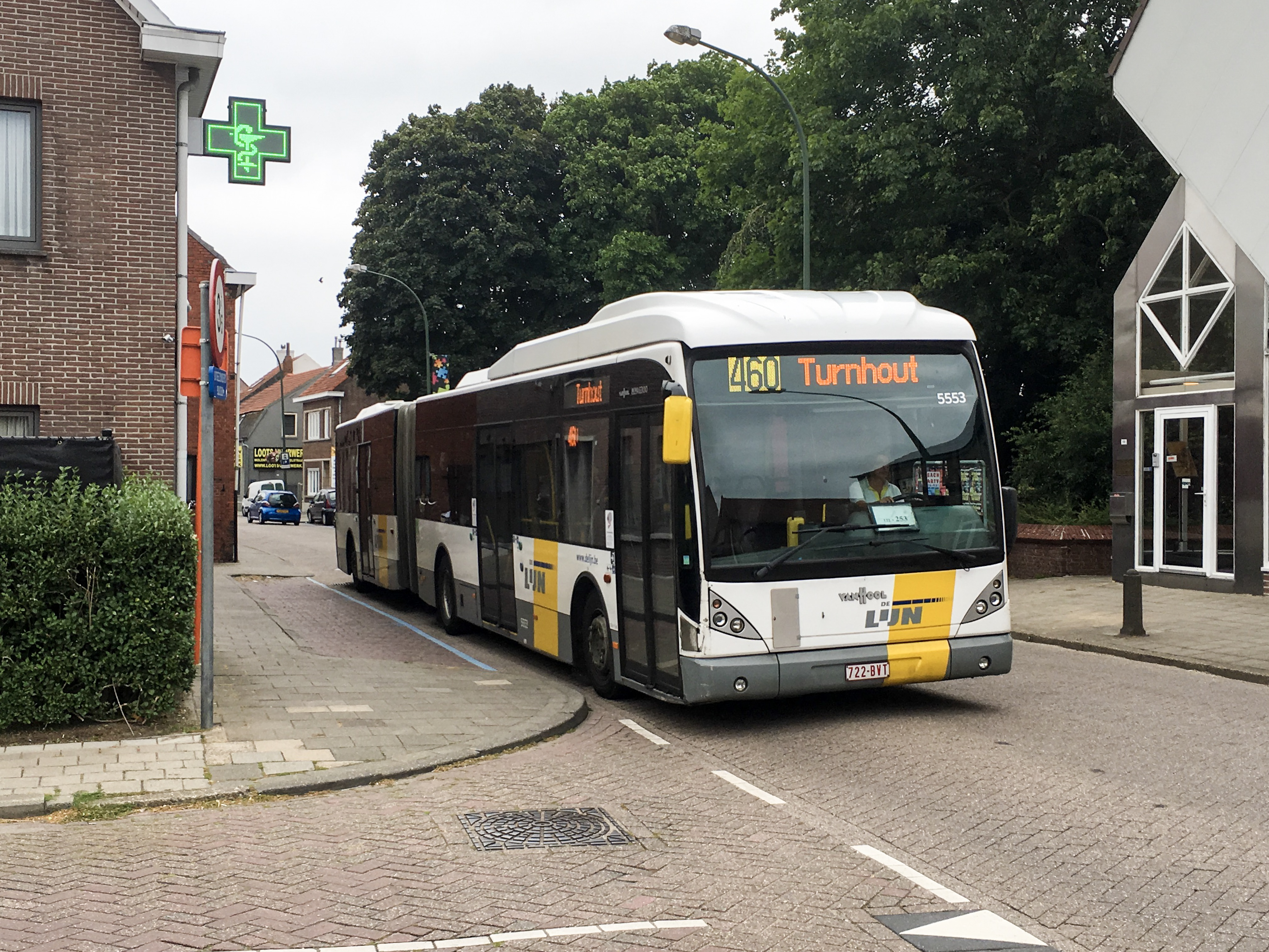
A VanHool bus in Baarle-Nassau on line 460 to Turnhout

The village of Baarle is easily accessible by car via the two Dutch provincial roads N260, N639 and the Belgian regional road N119. The highways A58 in the Netherlands, E19 and E34 in Belgium also run near the village.

=== Bus ===
Lines from De Lijn:

- Lijn 458 (Poppel – Hoogstraten)
- Lijn 459 (Turnhout – Hoogstraten)
- Lijn 460 (Turnhout – Baarle)

Lines from Arriva:

- Lijn 132 (Tilburg – Breda)

=== Rail ===
Baarle had two huge railway stations straddling the border, Baarle Grens and Weelde Station. The railway was established in 1867 and closed on 7 October 1934, running from spoorlijn Tilburg - Turnhout. This line has now been converted into a 31-kilometre-long cycle path, "Bels Lijntje", that links the two villages.

== Education ==
Baarle-Hertog has two schools: De Vlinder and De Horizon.

Baarle-Nassau and Baarle-Hertog have a joint library with Belgian and Dutch staff.

== Activities ==
Baarle has several clubs and societies. Some have both Belgian and Dutch counterparts: for example, the football clubs of Gloria US (Netherlands) and KVV Dosko (Belgium). In other cases there is only one club in Baarle. They include:

- Harmonie Sint Remi
- Stichting Jeugdwerk Baarle
- Heemkundekring Amalia van Solms
- De Baarlese Beeldhouwclub
- Karnavalsvereniging De Grenszuukers

== Media ==
=== Website ===
Both villages had a community website that could be accessed through both baarle-nassau.nl and baarle-hertog.be. By using European subsidies for border projects, the first community website opened in 2002. The website was taken down in 2004, after a Dutch opinion poll found that baarle-nassau.nl/baarle-hertog.be was one of the worst municipal websites. A new community website opened in 2005. As of 2012, each of the two Baarles has a different website.

=== Radio and television ===
The village of Baarle has its own local broadcasting, Baarle's local broadcasting, also known as Stille Genieter. In addition, there are still a number of regional broadcasters whose transmissions are received in Baarle, Omroep Brabant (In Baarle-Hertog one receives digital TV via Telenet) and RTV (only available in the Belgian area).

=== Newspapers and magazines ===
The regional newspapers in Baarle are BN DeStem, Brabants Dagblad and Gazet van Antwerpen. Baarle also has a weekly newspaper, Ons Weekblad.

== Neighbouring villages ==
Ulicoten, Castelré, Zondereigen, Weelde-Station, Weelde, Poppel, Alphen, Chaam

== See also ==
- Belgium–Netherlands border
