= Baarle-Nassau =

Municipality and town in North Brabant, Netherlands, Dutch territory of Baarle

- Municipality
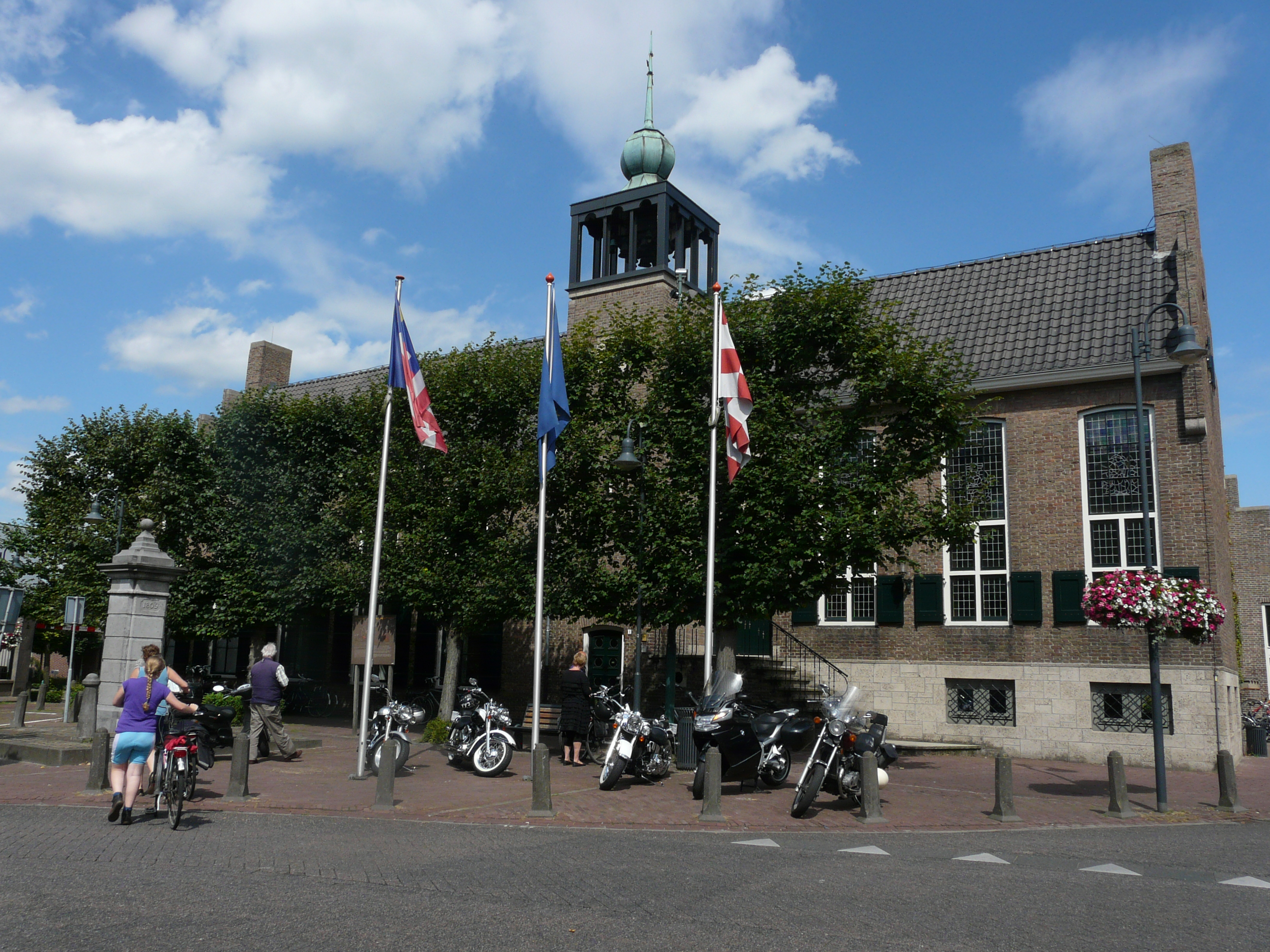
- Baarle-Nassau town hall

- Flag Coat of arms

- Location in North Brabant
- Coordinates: 51°27′N 4°56′E
- Country: Netherlands; however, the Dutch municipality of Baarle-Nassau totally surrounds numerous small exclaves of Belgium.
- Province: North Brabant

Government
  - Body: Municipal council
  - Mayor: Marjon de Hoon-Veelenturf (CDA)

Area
  - Total: 76.29 km^{2} (29.46 sq mi)
  - Land: 76.14 km^{2} (29.40 sq mi)
  - Water: 0.15 km^{2} (0.058 sq mi)
- Elevation: 28 m (92 ft)

Population (January 2021)
  - Total: 6,899
  - Density: 91/km^{2} (240/sq mi)
- Time zone: UTC+1 (CET)
  - Summer (DST): UTC+2 (CEST)
- Postcode: 5110–5114
- Area code: 013
- Website: www.baarle-nassau.nl

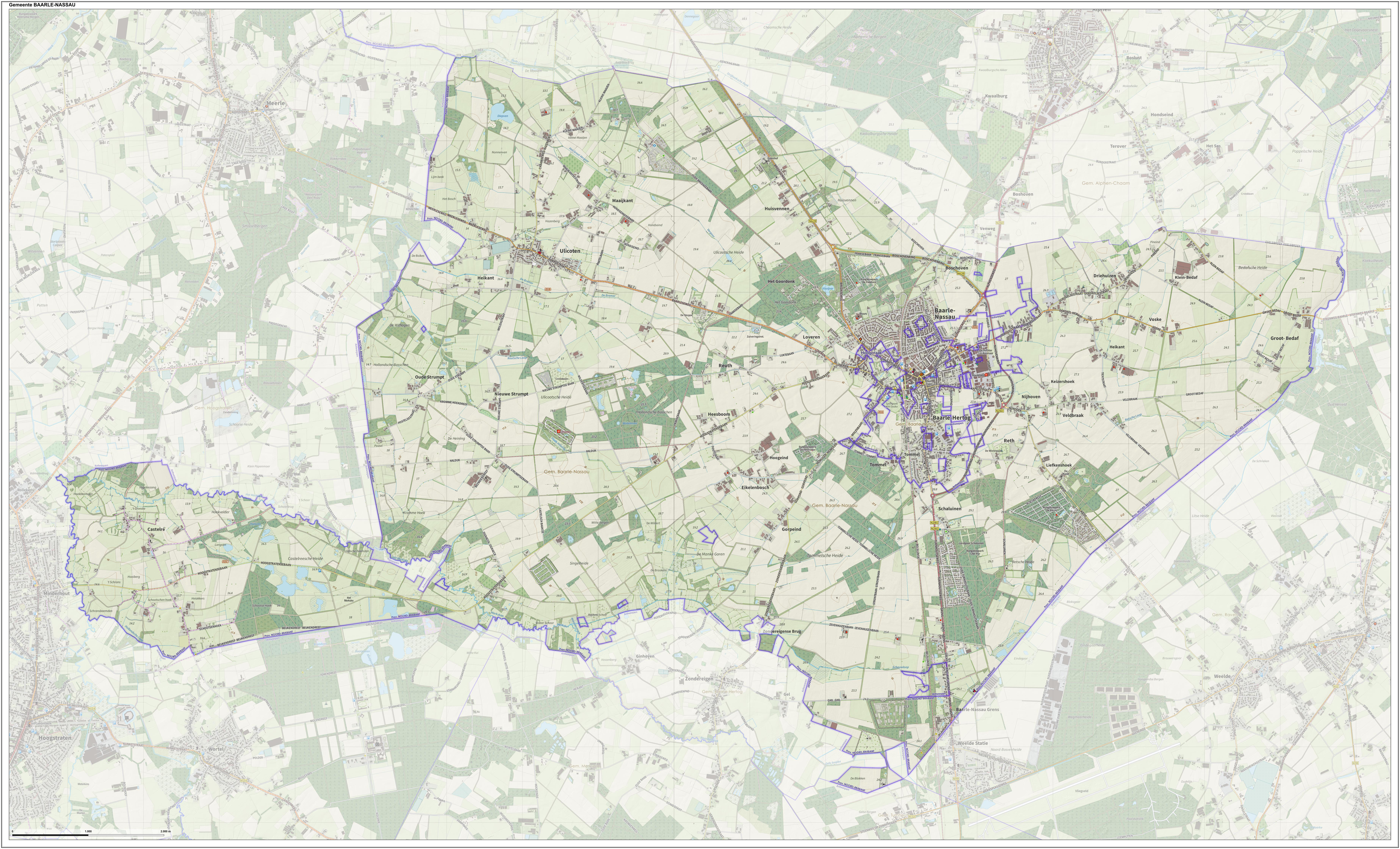
Topographic map of the municipality of Baarle-Nassau, June 2015

Baarle-Nassau (Dutch pronunciation: [ˌbaːrlə ˈnɑsʌu]) is a municipality and town in the southern Netherlands, located in the province of North Brabant. It had a population of 6,899 in 2019. The town is the site of a complicated borderline between Belgium and the Netherlands: it encloses 22 small exclaves of the Belgian town Baarle-Hertog, of which the two largest contain seven counter-enclaves of Baarle-Nassau, and the main body of Belgium contains another.

== Geography ==
=== The border with Baarle-Hertog, Belgium ===
Baarle-Nassau is closely linked, with complicated borders, to the Belgian exclaves of Baarle-Hertog. Baarle-Hertog consists of 26 separate parcels of land. Apart from the main parcel, known as Zondereigen and located north of the Belgian town of Merksplas, there are 22 Belgian exclaves in the Netherlands and three other parcels on the Dutch-Belgian border. There are also six Dutch exclaves located within the largest Belgian exclave, one within the second-largest, and an eighth within Zondereigen. The smallest Belgian parcel, H7, locally named De Loversche Akkers, measures 2,469 square metres (26,580 sq ft).

The border's complexity results from numerous medieval treaties, agreements, land-swaps and sales between the Lords of Breda and the Dukes of Brabant. Generally speaking, predominantly agricultural or built environments became constituents of Brabant, while other parts devolved to Breda. These distributions were ratified and clarified as a part of the borderline settlements arrived at during the Treaty of Maastricht in 1843.

For clarification and the interest of tourists, the border is made visible on all streets with iron pins. This way it is always clear whether one is in Belgium (Baarle-Hertog) or in the Netherlands (Baarle-Nassau). This is also visible on the house numbers: the style of house numbers is different in both countries, and often the Dutch or Belgian flag next to the house number indicates which country it belongs to.

Belgian and Dutch territory in Baarle

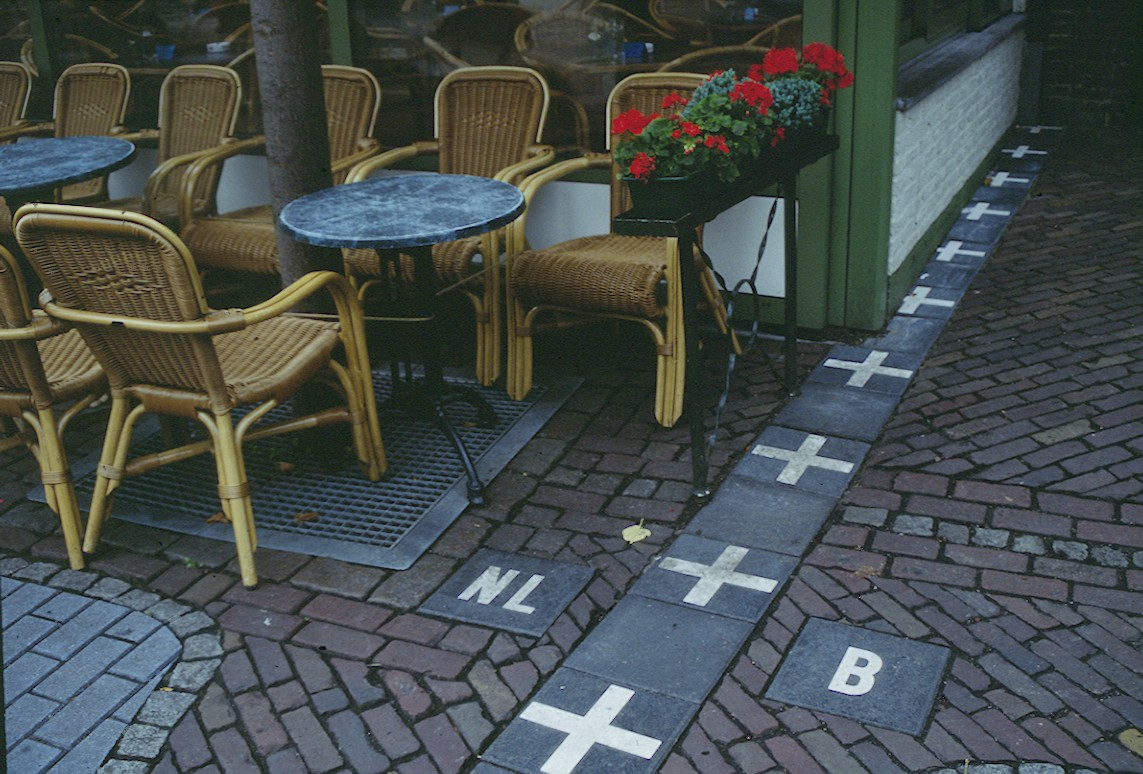
Border between Netherlands and Belgium in Baarle

=== Localities ===
- Baarle-Nassau (population: 5,330)
- Ulicoten (1,110)
- Castelré (140)

=== List of enclaves ===
==== Dutch enclaves ====
These are all part of Baarle-Nassau municipality.

Serial no. and local name	Area (ha)	area acre	Notes
(Netherlands) N1, De Loversche Akkers – De Tommelsche Akkers	5.3667	13.2617	Counter-enclave surrounded by Belgian exclave H1; contains a mix of dwellings and farmland; boundary runs through one building.
(Netherlands) N2, De Tommelsche Akkers	1.3751	3.3981	Counter-enclave surrounded by Belgian exclave H1; contains 8 dwellings.
(Netherlands) N3, De Tommelsche Akkers	0.2863	0.7075	Counter-enclave surrounded by Belgian exclave H1; boundary bisects the loading dock of a liquor store.
(Netherlands) N4, De Rethsche Akkers	1.2324	3.0454	Counter-enclave surrounded by Belgian exclave H1; boundary runs through a warehouse, with vacant Dutch land to the rear of the warehouse.
(Netherlands) N5, De Rethsche Akkers	1.9212	4.7475	Counter-enclave surrounded by Belgian exclave H1; boundary runs through a furniture showroom, a shed and a barn.
(Netherlands) N6, Gierle Straat	1.4527	3.5898	Counter-enclave surrounded by Belgian exclave H1; consists of farmland with two buildings.
(Netherlands) N7, De Kastelein	0.5812	1.4363	Counter-enclave surrounded by Belgian Oordeel exclave H8; occupies part of a field.
(Netherlands) N8, Vossenberg	2.8528	7.0496	Farmland enclave situated within Zondereigen, Belgium, less than 50 meters south of the Dutch border.

==== Belgian enclaves ====
These are all part of Baarle-Hertog municipality, and are surrounded by Baarle-Nassau municipality (Netherlands).

Serial no. and local name	Area (ha)	area acre	Notes
(Belgium) H1, Aen het Klooster Straetje - Hoofdbraek - Loveren - De Boschcovensche Akkers - De Loversche Akkers - De Tommelsche Akkers - De Tommel - De Gierle Straat - De Reth - De Rethsche Akkers - Het Dorp - De Kapel Akkers - De Kastelein	153.6448	379.6717	Forms a quadripoint with enclave H2; largest Belgian exclave; encompasses six Dutch enclaves; consists of dwellings for the most part, with outlying farmland and an industrial area; boundary runs through numerous buildings; contains a portion of the former Turnhout-Tilburg rail line, now a cycle path.
(Belgium) H2, De Rethsche Akkers	2.4116	5.9594	Consists of farmland with a single point of connection (quadripoint) between enclaves H1 and H2 in the middle of a corn field.
(Belgium) H3, De Rethsche Akkers	0.3428	0.8471	Occupies part of a field; boundary runs through a shed in one instance.
(Belgium) H4, De Rethsche Akkers	1.476	3.6474	Consists of farmland; boundary runs through a house and three sheds.
(Belgium) H5, De Kapel Akkers	0.9245	2.2846	Consists of farmland with a dwelling.
(Belgium) H6, Hoofdbraek	1.7461	4.3148	Mixed land usage; boundary runs through a warehouse/factory.
(Belgium) H7, De Loversche Akkers	0.2469	0.6102	Boundary runs through two dwellings, including the middle of one front door (giving it two house numbers: Loveren 2, Baarle-Hertog / Loveren 19, Baarle-Nassau).
(Belgium) H8, Boschcoven - De Kastelein - De Oordelsche Straat	41.8781	103.485	Second-largest Belgian exclave, contains a mix of dwellings and farmland; boundary runs through a barn, a dwelling and two businesses.
(Belgium) H9, De Kapel Akkers	0.4005	0.9897	Boundary runs through a printing factory/warehouse in an industrial area.
(Belgium) H10, De Oordelsche Straat	0.65	1.6063	Consists of farmland.
(Belgium) H11, De Oordelsche Straat	0.93	2.2982	Consists of farmland.
(Belgium) H12, Boschcoven	0.2822	0.6974	Consists of farmland.
(Belgium) H13, Boschcoven	1.5346	3.7922	Boundary runs through about 20 dwellings.
(Belgium) H14, Boschcoven	0.7193	1.7774	Boundary runs through about 13 dwellings.
(Belgium) H15, Boschcoven	1.7211	4.2531	Boundary runs through about 16 dwellings.
(Belgium) H16, Keizershoek - Oordelsche Straat	4.4252	10.9352	Boundary runs through a house and three sheds, with the linear boundary changing direction three times inside just one shed.
(Belgium) H17, Moleriet Heide	14.9248	36.8807	Rural area containing a portion of the former Turnhout-Tilburg rail line, now a cycle path.
(Belgium) H18, De Manke Gooren	2.9247	7.2273	Consists of farmland.
(Belgium) H19, De Peruiters	0.6851	1.693	Consists of several ponds and a field.
(Belgium) H20, Wurstenbosch - Vossenberg	1.1681	2.8865	Consists of farmland.
(Belgium) H21, Baelbrugsche Beemden	1.1845	2.9271	Consists of farmland.
(Belgium) H22, De Wit Hagen	0.2632	0.6504	South of the village of Ulicoten; occupies part of a field; nationality was contested from the 1830s until 1995 (remained unallocated to either country in boundary treaty of 26 April 1974)

== Education ==
Baarle-Nassau has two primary schools: Basisschool De Uilenpoort and Bernardusschool, the latter in the Ulicoten section. There is a single secondary school in Baarle-Nassau, De La Salle, which has Voorbereidend middelbaar beroepsonderwijs, lower Hoger algemeen voortgezet onderwijs, and Voorbereidend wetenschappelijk onderwijs levels.

It shares, with Baarle-Hertog, a joint library with Belgian and Dutch staff.

== Notable people ==
- Petrus Christus (c. 1410/1420 in Baarle – 1475/1476) an Early Netherlandish painter; was a leading painter after the death of Jan van Eyck
- Jan Hendrikx (1944–2021) a former Dutch politician, mayor of Baarle-Nassau 1990–2012

== Gallery ==
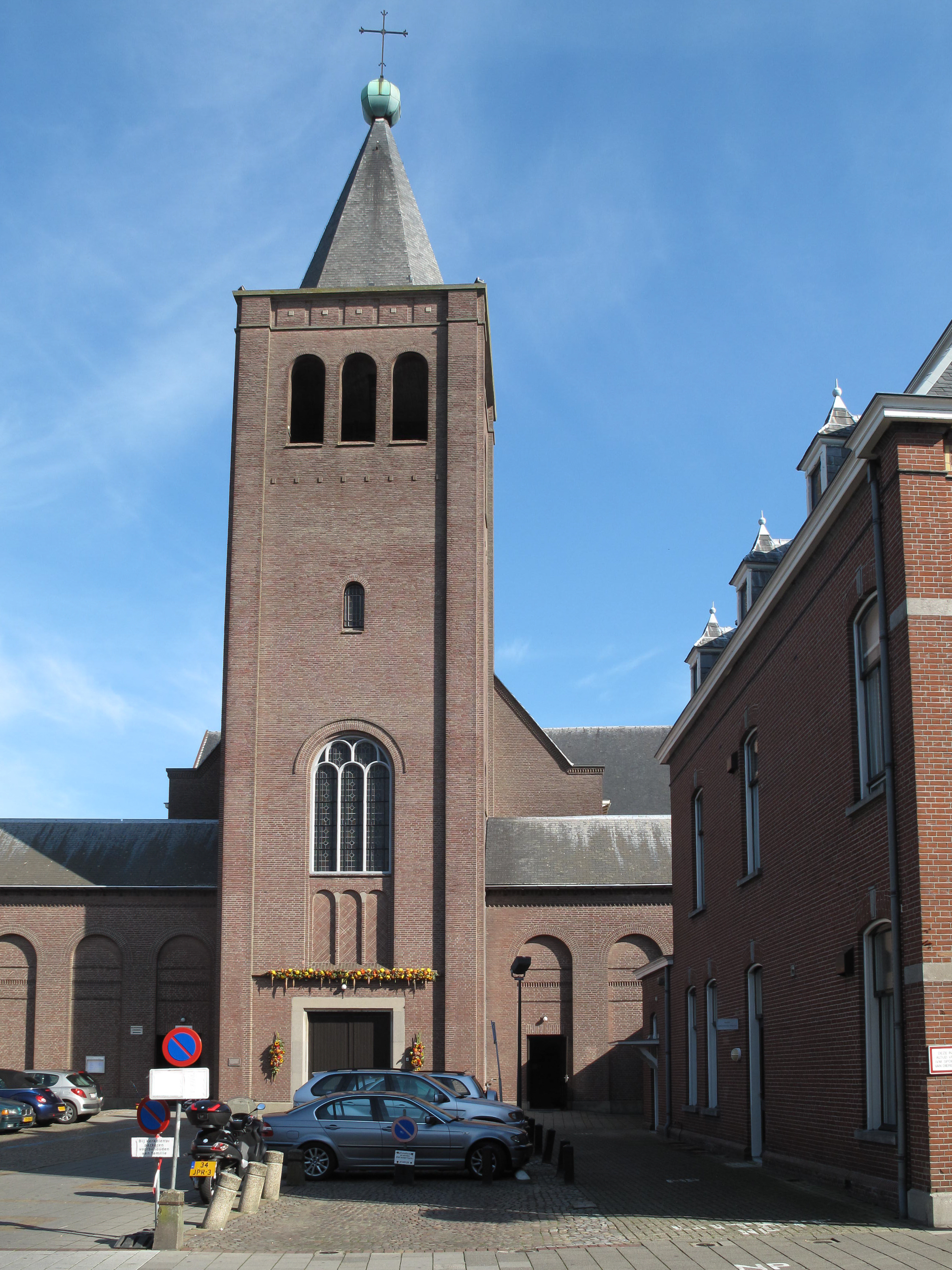
Baarle-Nassau, church

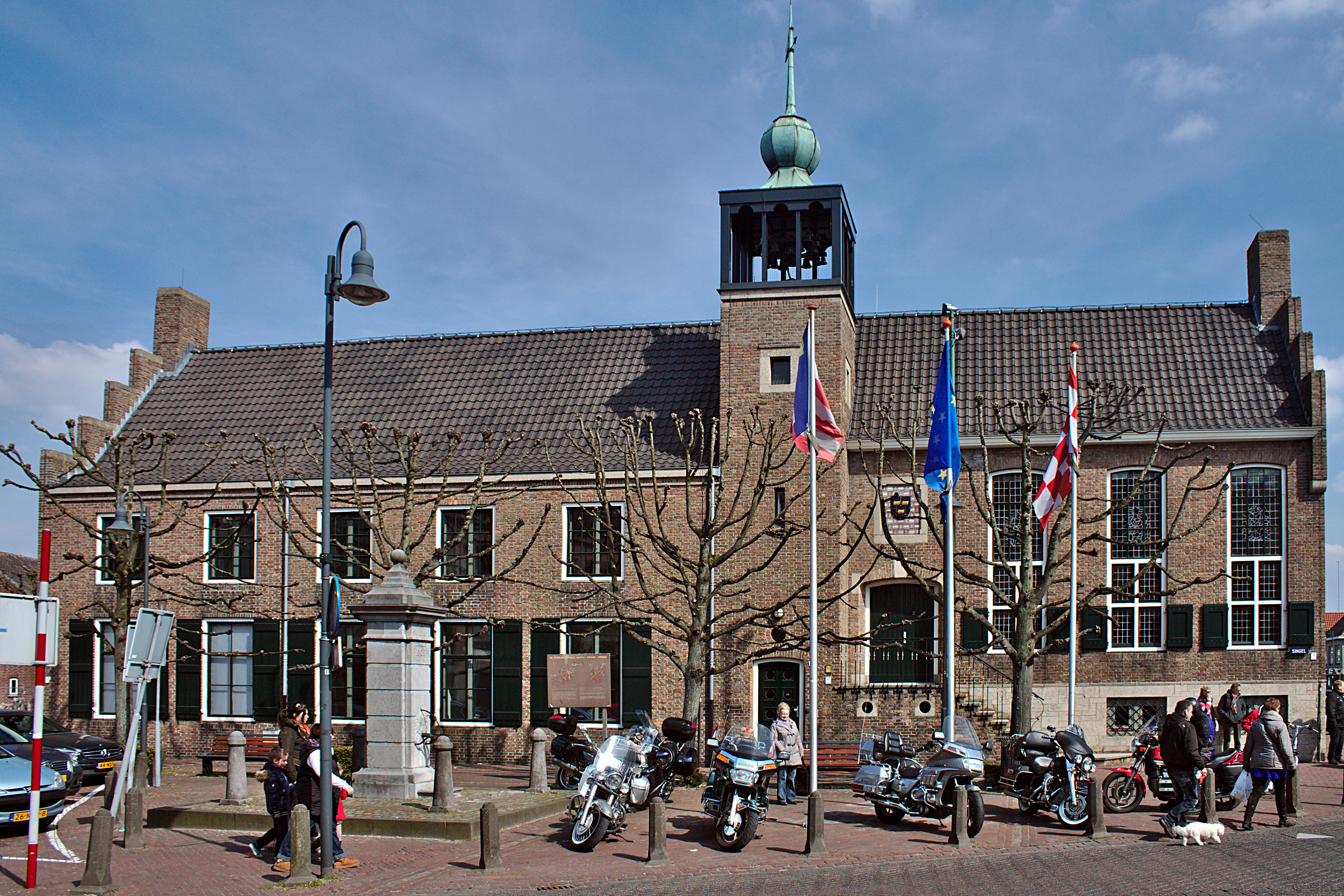
Baarle-Nassau, town hall

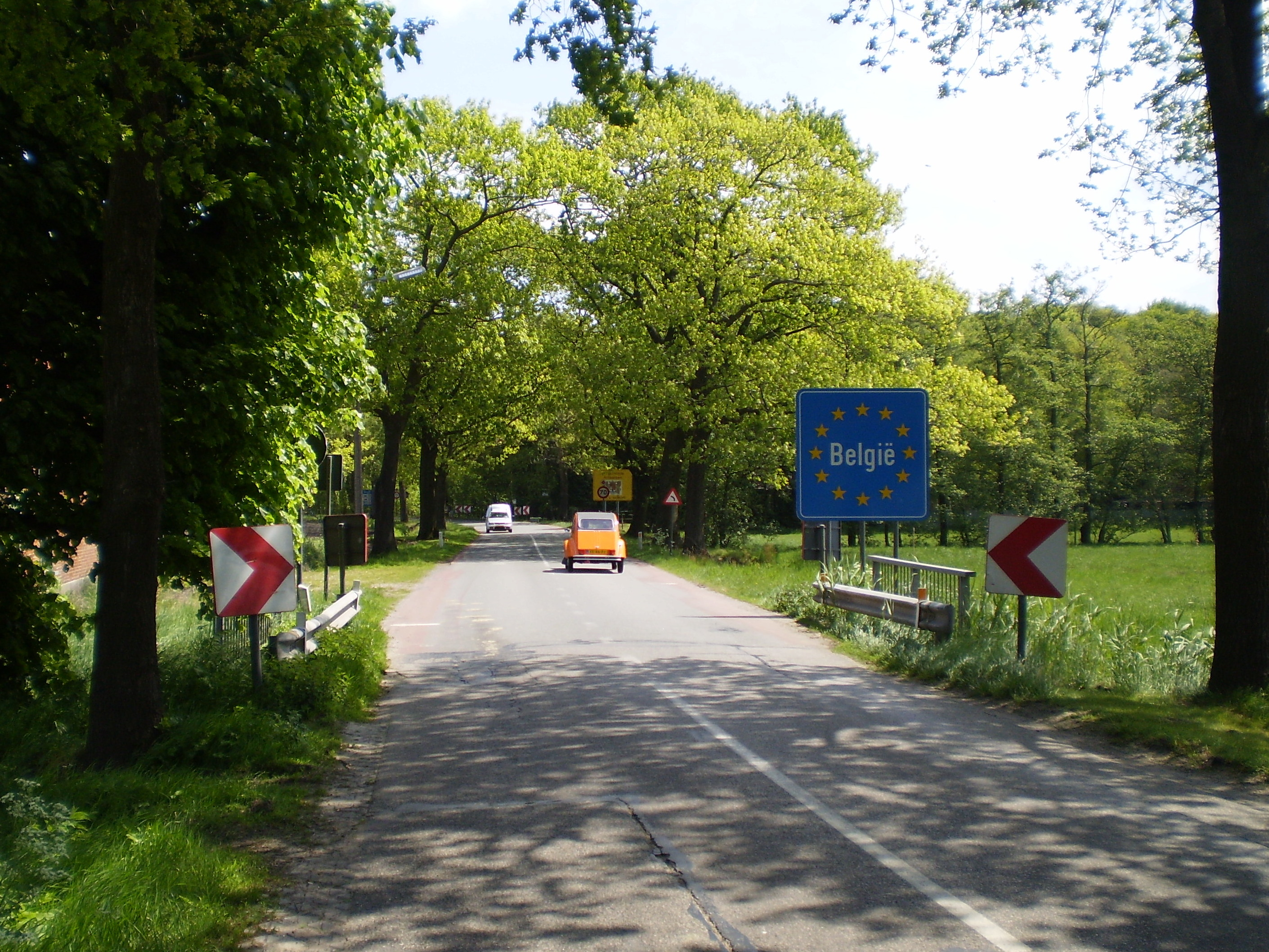
Grensovergang Poppel-Baarle

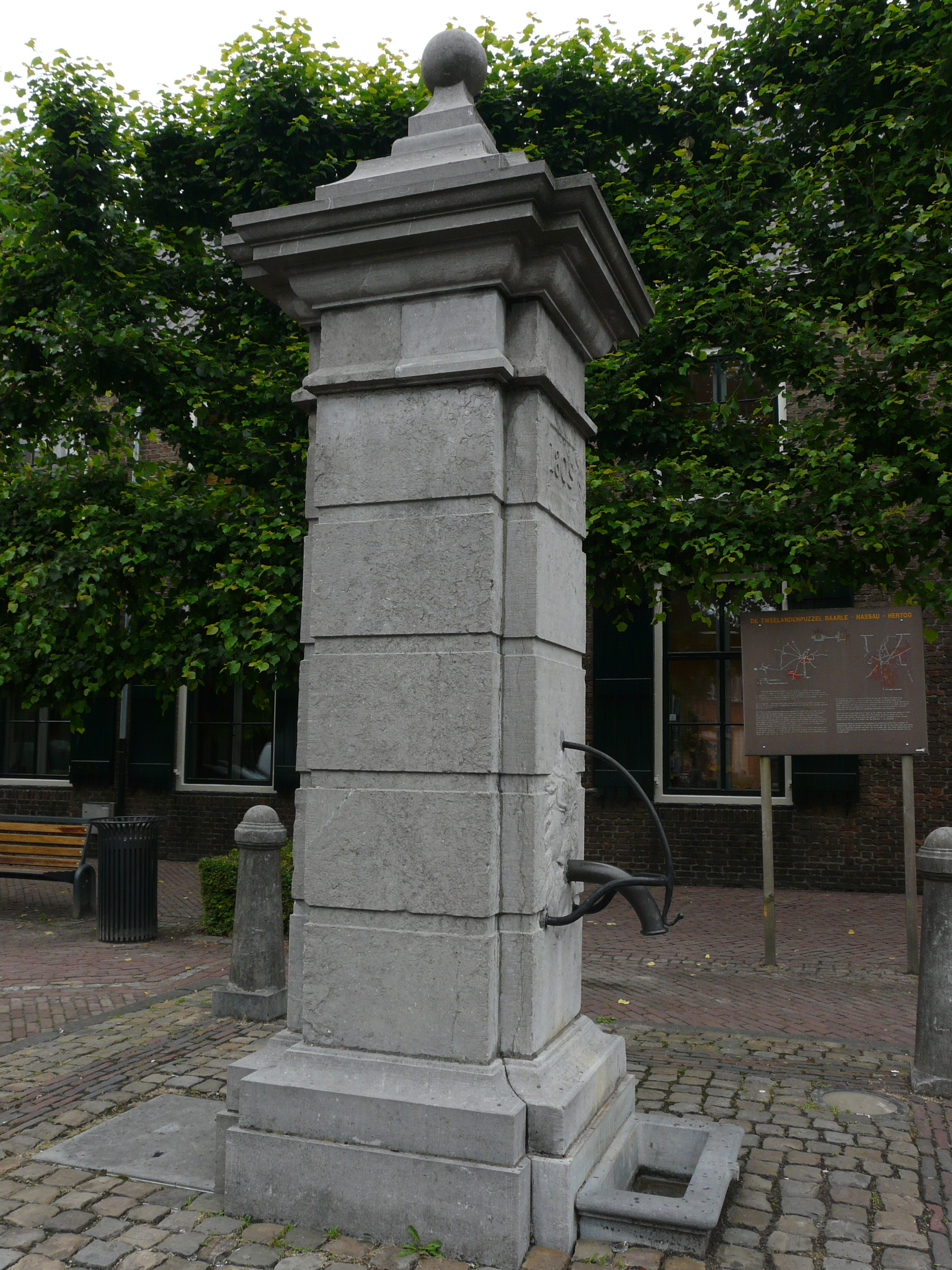
Baarle-Nassau, bij Singel, water pump
