= Brownies & Downies =

Restaurant chain in the Netherlands

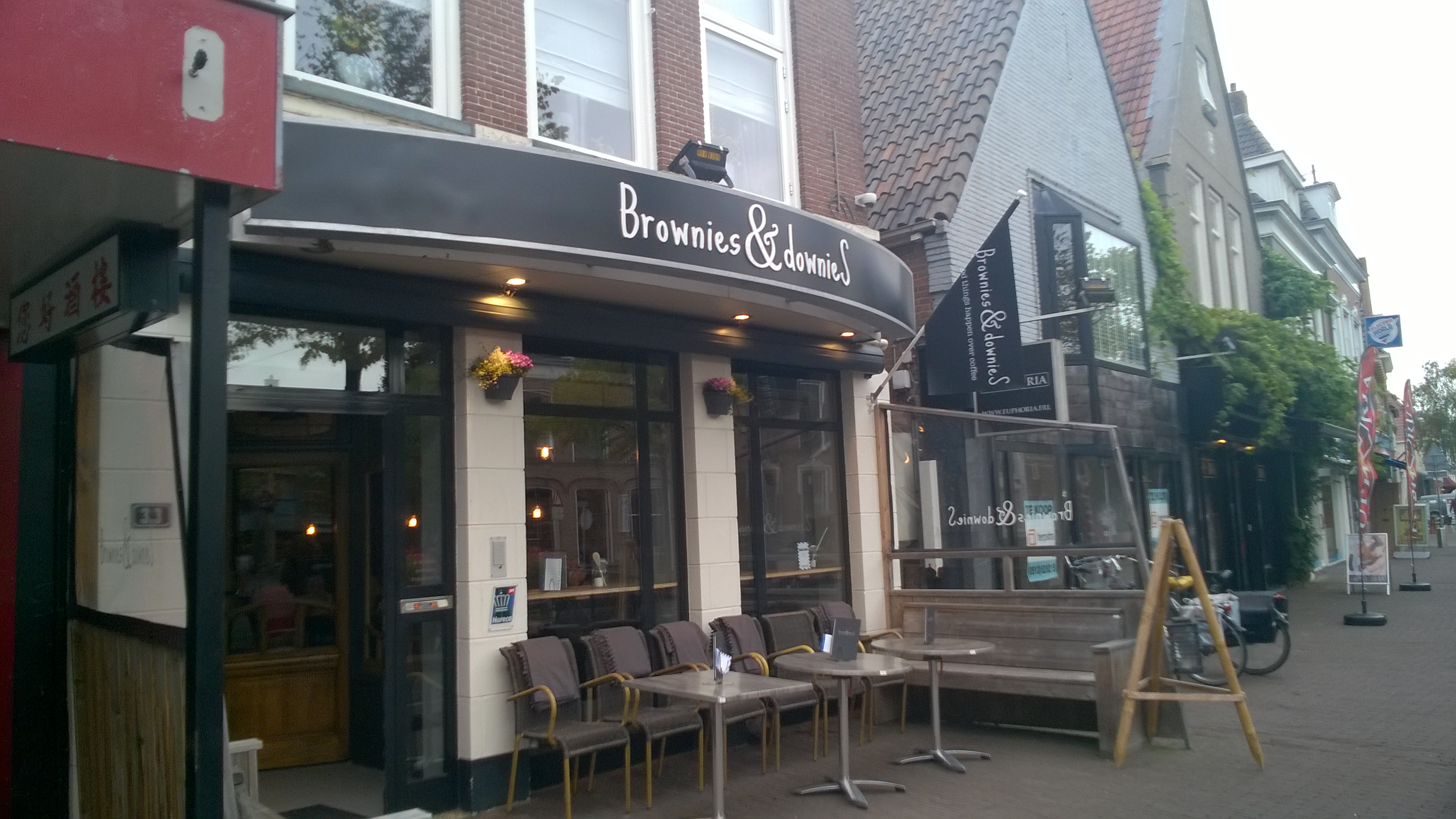
- A branch of Brownies and Downies in Heerenveen, Netherlands
- Industry: Restaurant
- Founded: 2010; 16 years ago in Veghel, Netherlands
- Founder: Teun Horck; Thijs Swinkels
- Headquarters: Netherlands
- Number of locations: 59 (2024)
- Area served: Netherlands
- Key people: Teun Horck; Thijs Swinkels; Wendy Schultz
- Products: Sandwiches; salad; soup; brownies; street food
- Website: browniesanddownies.nl

Brownies & Downies is a chain of restaurants primarily operating in the Netherlands with a single branch in Baarle-Hertog, Belgium. As of 2024, the franchise consists of 59 locations, all of which primarily hires those with learning disabilities in an effort to de-stigmatise them and provide opportunities to those with them in the hospitality industry. Additionally, Brownies & Downies prepares and trains people to become franchisees.

Prior to the COVID-19 pandemic there was also a store in Cape Town, South Africa that was founded by Wendy Schultz in 2016, however the store had to close permanently due to the complications presented by the lockdown.

== Netherlands ==
Brownies & Downies was founded in Veghel, Netherlands in 2010 by two friends, Teun Horck and Thijs Swinkels. Horck was a chef and Swinkels was a special needs teacher. Swinkels wanted to create job opportunities for those with learning disabilities in the hospitality industry, leading the pair to form the business as a non-profit coffee shop. The business would later swap to a for-profit business model so as to avoid relying on government subsidies or donations and ensure that employees were paid a fair minimum wage.

Brownies & Downies won the Food Service Award for coffee and lunchrooms in 2020 with a final score of 8.14 in that category, scoring highest on customer friendliness and the appearance and experience of their coffee and lunchrooms. Later that same year, a new branch opened at the Eindhoven University of Technology, its second branch in Eindhoven.

Appèl, a catering company for schools, events and companies, partnered with Brownies & Downies in mid-2021 to open a branch in the University of Twente, with plans to open more branches in other settings together in the future. The Brownies & Downies branch at the University closed in July 2025.

As of October 2024, Brownies & Downies employed over 1,000 people with Down Syndrome.

== Cape Town ==
Wendy Schultz was completing a social work internship for her degree in Cape Town in 2010, after which she decided to stay in the city. Much like Horck and Swinkels, Schultz saw the lack of facilities, training and job opportunities available to those with learning disabilities after the completion of schooling, while also becoming increasingly aware of the stigma surrounding interacting with those with learning disabilities. This led to her later returning to the Netherlands and contacting Horck and Swinkels to gain their support for a branch and training centre in Cape Town.

They both offered their support to her, leading to the foundation of the Cape Town branch in 2016 and Our Second Home, a non-profit organisation aimed at working with Brownies & Downies to train those with learning disabilities interested hospitality and retail.

Both the Cape Town branch and Our Second Home would later win several awards, including first place in the 2017 SABF Disability Empowerment Awards and a public service award in the 2018 Oliver Top Empowerment Awards.

Despite the success of the Cape Town branch, when the COVID-19 pandemic hit and lockdowns began, the branch had to close permanently in 2020 after an 11-week struggle to keep operating due to persistent overhead costs, a sharp decline in income and a reduction in donations.

== Controversy ==
Controversy surrounding the name of the business was present in South Africa when the branch first opened there, with some saying it was completely inappropriate. In a 2016 interview, Schultz said of this;

"The name was created by parents in the Netherlands who are parents of young adults with down syndrome. Before we took it over to South Africa, we talked to a lot of parents at the Down Syndrome Association Western Cape, and they are fine with the name. They say it is not about the name, it is about the fact that there is finally a place where they are accepted for who they are and where they can work."

Additionally, in a 2019 interview an employee of the Cape Town branch said;

"Some parents are always going to think there’s a problem with it because they think they are trying to diss the kids, but it’s not like that at all, it’s a very beautiful concept and everyone likes it."
