= Jan Hendrikx =

Dutch politician

J.P.M.M. (Jan) Hendrikx (17 July 1944–11 November 2021) was a Dutch politician. He was a member of the Christian Democratic Appeal (Christen-Democratisch Appèl). From 1990 to 2012, he was mayor of the municipality of Baarle-Nassau. Previously he was an alderman of the municipality of Someren. Both municipalities are situated in the province of North Brabant.
