= Belgium–Netherlands border =

International border

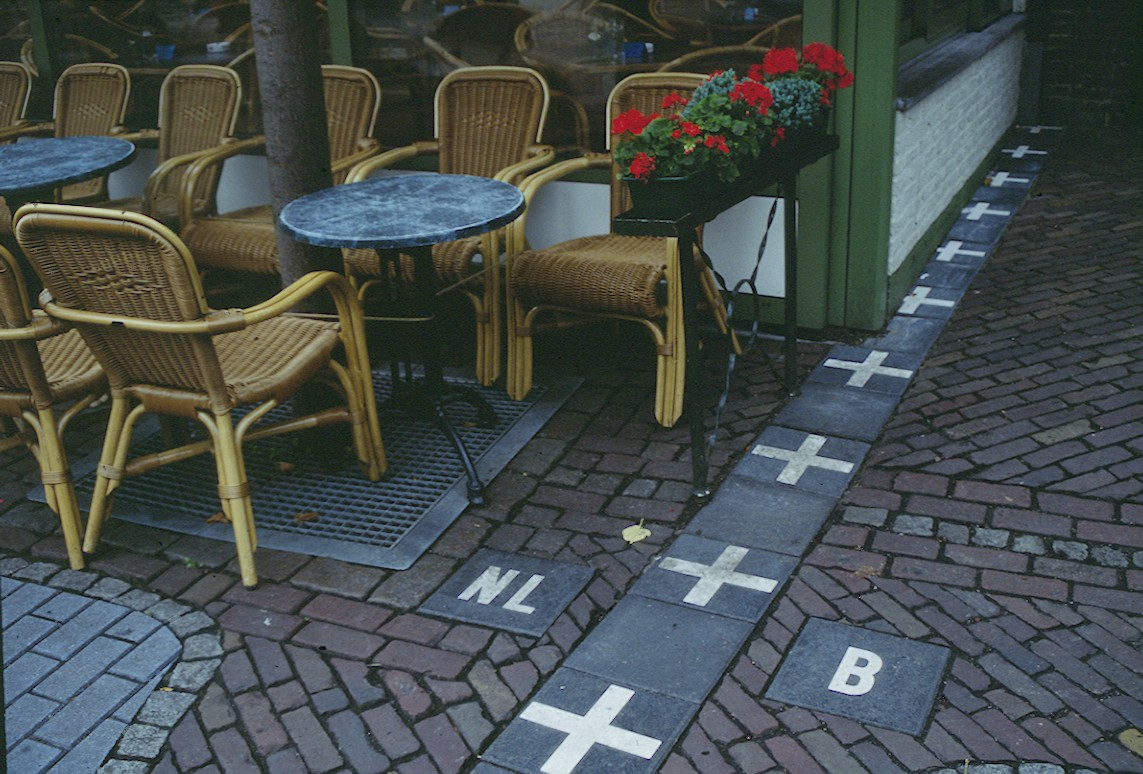
- Border in Baarle.

Characteristics
- Entities: Belgium Netherlands
- Length: 450 km (280 mi)
- Enclave and exclaves: Belgium: 22; Baarle-Hertog; Netherlands: 8 Baarle-Nassau

History
- Established: 5 November 1842; Boundary Treaty
- Current shape: 2018; Territorial swap and border realignment.

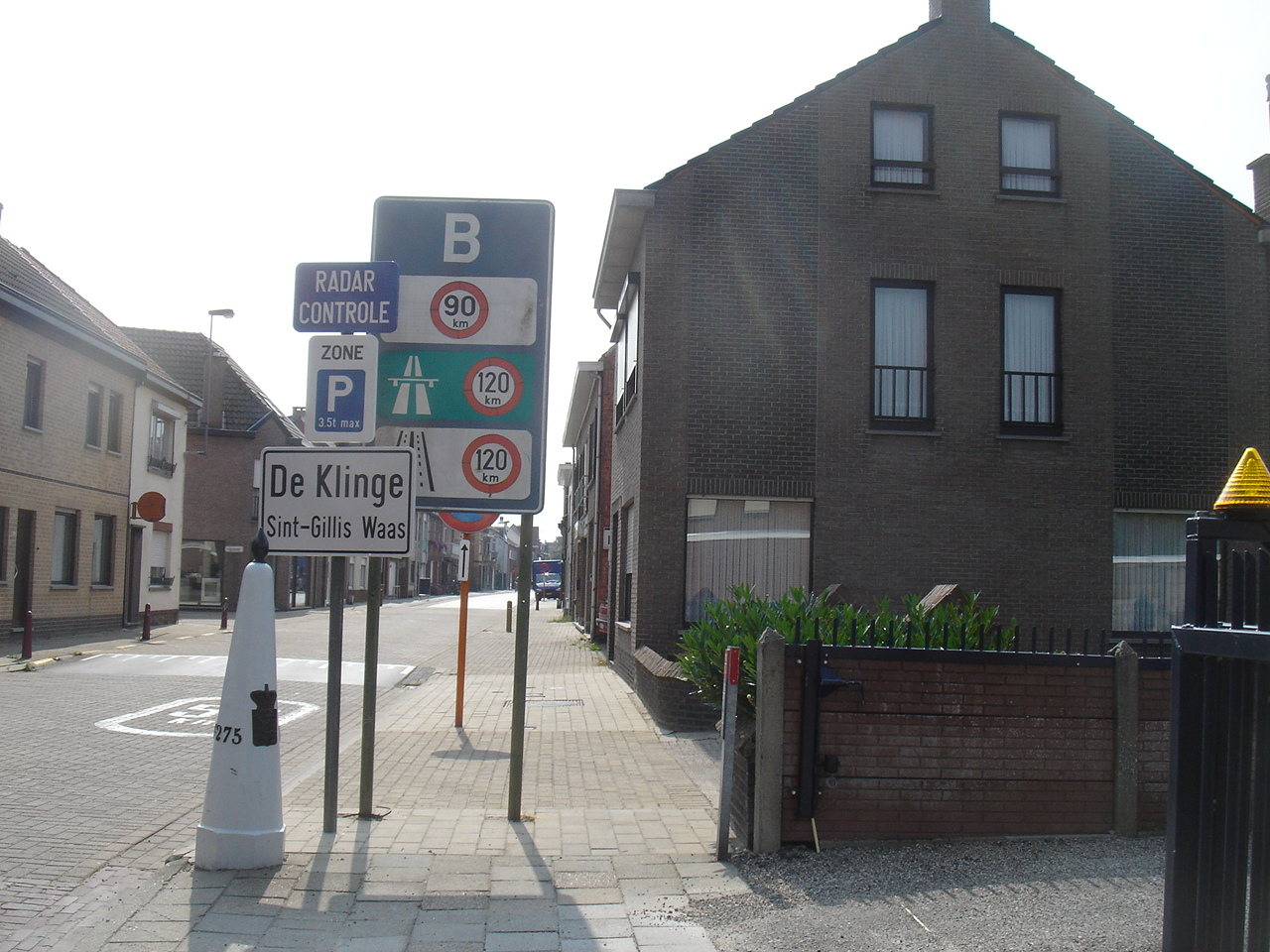
Road signs showing the entry to Belgium from Clinge, the Netherlands.

The Belgium–Netherlands border separates Belgium and the Netherlands and is 450 km (280 mi) long.

Belgium and the Netherlands are part of the Schengen Area. This means there are no permanent border controls at this border, although the controls between Belgium and the Netherlands had been removed well before the Schengen Treaty was signed, as a result of the Benelux Union being signed in 1944 and ratified in 1947.

On the Belgian side, the border is shared by four Flemish provinces (out of the five in the Flemish Region). From west to east: West Flanders, East Flanders, Antwerp and Limburg (Belgium). A small part is shared by the Walloon province of Liège, which also includes the German-speaking East Cantons. On the Dutch side, the border is shared by three provinces: Zeeland, North Brabant and Limburg.

Between Belgian and Dutch Limburg, the border is mostly formed by the Meuse (Maas) river. The other parts of the border are mostly on land. The city of Baarle-Hertog forms a Belgian exclave in the Netherlands. The border is complicated there, with Dutch exclaves inside it.

The eastern end point is the tripoint (together with Germany) at Vaalserberg.

== History ==
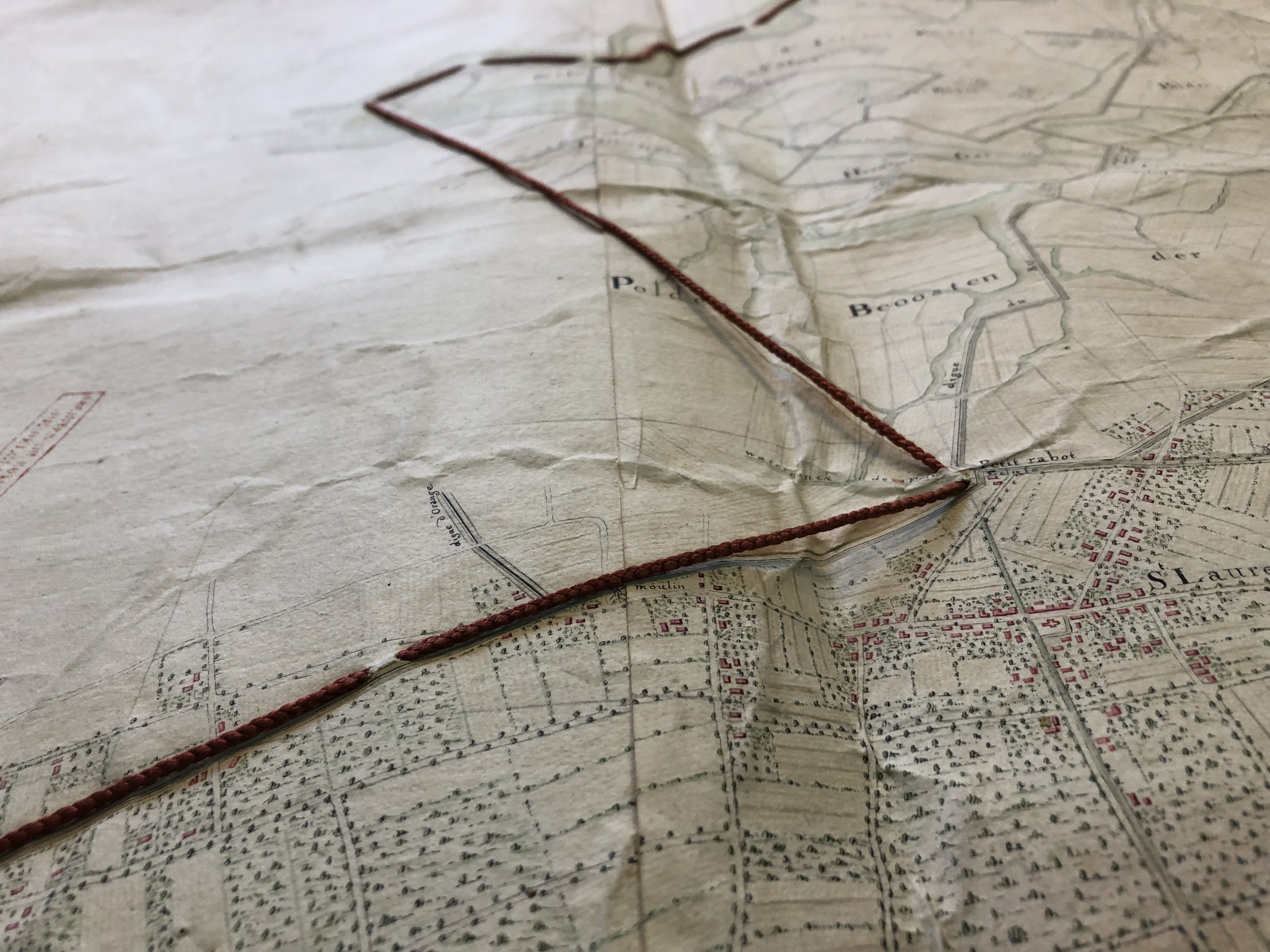
Border agreed between the Habsburg Empire and the Dutch Republic at the end of the War of the Spanish Succession.

=== Boundary treaties of 1842 and 1843 ===
The border between Belgium and the Netherlands came into existence with the secession of the southern provinces of the Netherlands that became Belgium. Although the secession took place in 1830 Belgian Revolution and was recognised by the Netherlands in 1839 with the Treaty of London, the border between the two countries was only delimited by the Boundary Treaty signed in the Hague on 5 November 1842, and the Convention of Maastricht of 8 August 1843. The Hague Treaty delimited the border in general terms while the Maastricht Convention delineated the boundary with detailed descriptions and maps on a 1:10,000 or, where necessary, 1:2,500 scale. A total of 365 border posts were erected to indicate the border.

While the two treaties resulted in the finalisation and demarcation of the main border between the two countries, it left the complicated territorial situation in Baarle unresolved. The current Belgian enclaves as well as Dutch counter-enclaves which has resulted in what has been called the world's most complicated international boundary, is a continuation of land ownership from the feudal age. Several subsequent negotiations failed to resolve the territorial issues here.

The complicated border has also led to some unexpected legal issues, such as the so-called border corpse (Dutch: grenslijk). In 2008, a 25-year old woman from Belarus was found dead in her home right on the border, about a year after she had gone missing. Parts of the house were in the Netherlands (Baarle-Nassau), other parts in Belgium (Baarle-Hertog). GPS measurements determined that her body was found just on the Dutch side of the border. Her husband was arrested, prosecuted under Dutch law and eventually convicted for homicide.

=== Wire of Death ===
During World War I, an electric fence was installed along the border by the German Army, called the Wire of Death.

== Border changes ==
At least two border changes have occurred in recent history with regard to the Belgium–Netherlands border.

=== Ghent-Terneuzen Canal ===
On 23 June 1999, a border realignment took place along the Ghent-Terneuzen Canal after alterations to the course of the canal. Two parcels of land were ceded to Belgium and one was ceded to the Netherlands.

=== Meuse River ===
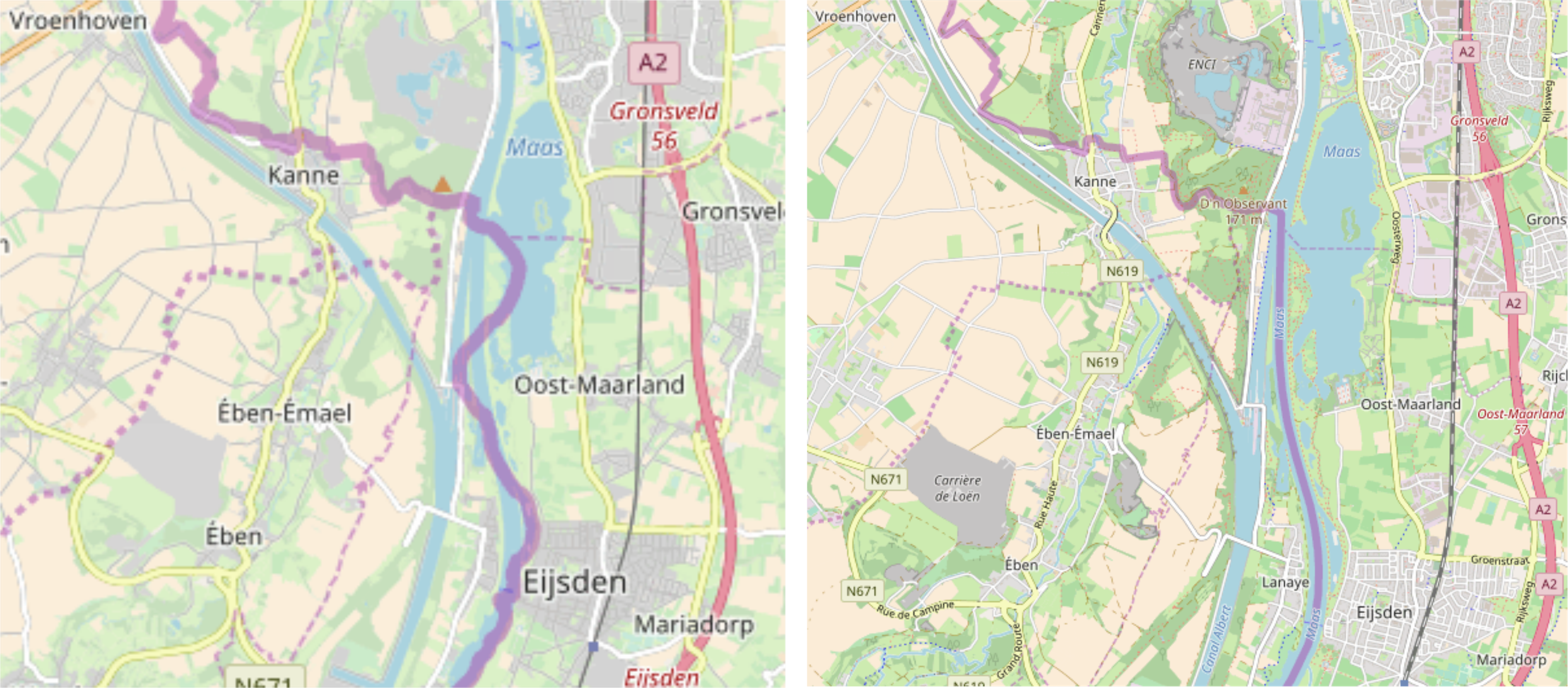
Maps showing the border along the Meuse before (left) and after (right) the territorial swap and border realignment.

On 1 January 2018, a border realignment together with a corresponding territorial swap between Belgium and the Netherlands took place along the Meuse River near Eijsden in Limburg Province. The realignment straightened and simplified the border by making it run along the current Meuse River alignment.

Previously, the border curved between the left and right bank of the river as it followed its old course prior to dredging and straightening between 1960 and 1980. These curves resulted in several pieces of territory being cut off from the main part of the country by the river. This posed some legal complications including difficulties in policing and law enforcement as this would require access by enforcement personnel via a foreign country. These territories became known for drug trafficking and prostitution. The complications were brought to focus when a headless torso was found in one of these territories which belonged to Belgium in 2014. To reach that piece of territory to conduct investigations, Belgian police had to travel by boat and faced various difficulties including not having a place to dock their boats.

Hailed as an example of good diplomacy and successful negotiated solutions to border problems, the treaty for the territorial swap and border realignment was signed in 2016. The territorial swap saw Belgium giving a total of 16.37 hectares (40.45 acres) of land to the Netherlands comprising two uninhabited riverine peninsulas, previously cut off from "mainland" Belgium by Dutch territory, known as Presqu’île de L’llal and Presqu’île d’Eijsden. In return, the Netherlands gave Presqu’île Petit-Gravier which was 3.08 hectares (7.63 acres) in size, to Belgium.

== See also ==
- Belgium–Netherlands relations
