= Zondereigen =

- Village
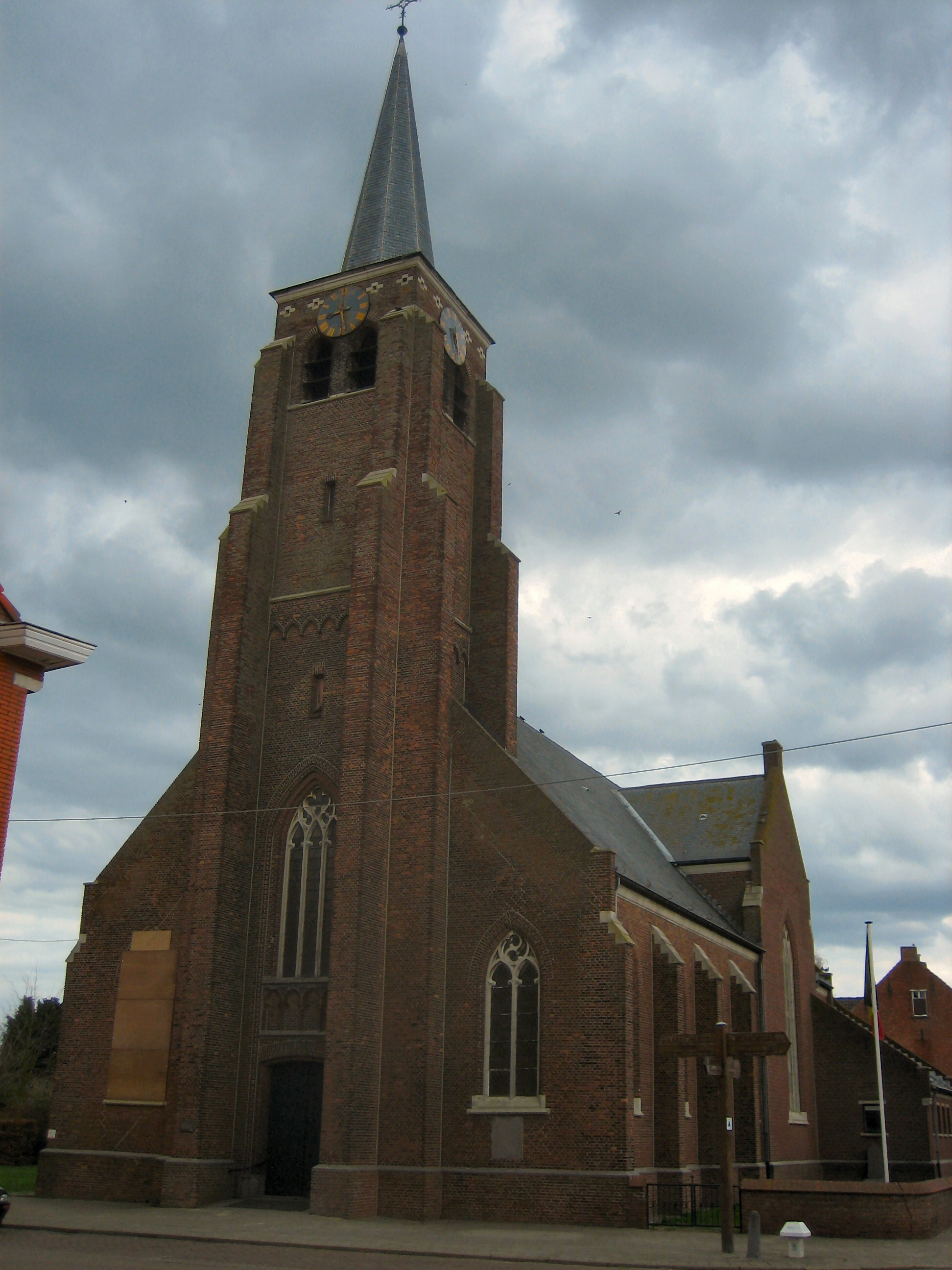
- Church of Saint Rumbold

- Location in Belgium
- Coordinates: 51.4067°N 4.8931°E
- Country: Belgium
- Region: Flemish Region
- Province: Antwerp
- Municipality: Baarle-Hertog

Area
  - Total: 4.89 km^{2} (1.89 sq mi)

Population (2021)
  - Total: 478
  - Density: 97.8/km^{2} (253/sq mi)
- Time zone: CET

Zondereigen (Dutch pronunciation: [ˌzɔndərˈɛiɣə(n)]) is a village in the municipality of Baarle-Hertog, in the province of Antwerp, Belgium. In 2021, it was home to 478 inhabitants. Zondereigen borders the Dutch province of North Brabant, and contains a Dutch enclave.

== History ==
The village is located on the Belgian side of the border, but contains one Dutch enclave. It was first mentioned in 1251 as Sonderheighen. Zondereigen used to be part of the heerlijkheid of Ginhoven. In 1440, it became the property of the Tongerlo Abbey. In 1842, Zondereigen became an independent parish.

In 1831, during the Belgian Revolution, there was a minor skirmish in Zondereigen. In 1843, the Netherlands and Belgium were unable to define the borders in Baarle, and smuggling became a major part of the economy of Zondereigen. It continued until 1974 when a border was demarcated between Zondereigen and Baarle. During World War I, the Wire of Death ran through the village to prevent escapes to the Netherlands. In 1944, Zondereigen was the scene of severe fighting between the Germans and the Free Polish forces. Many buildings including the church were destroyed.

== Gallery ==
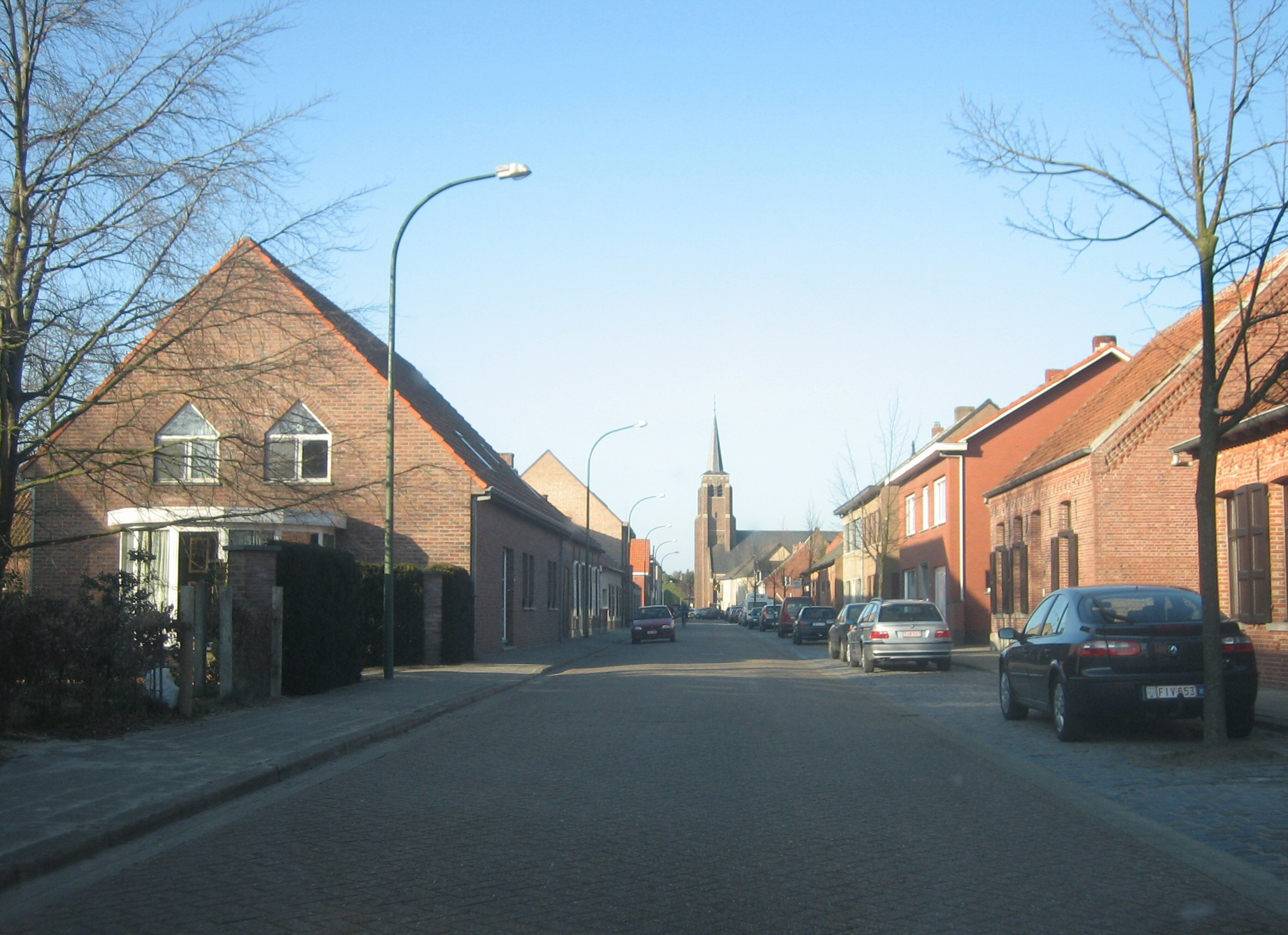
Main street

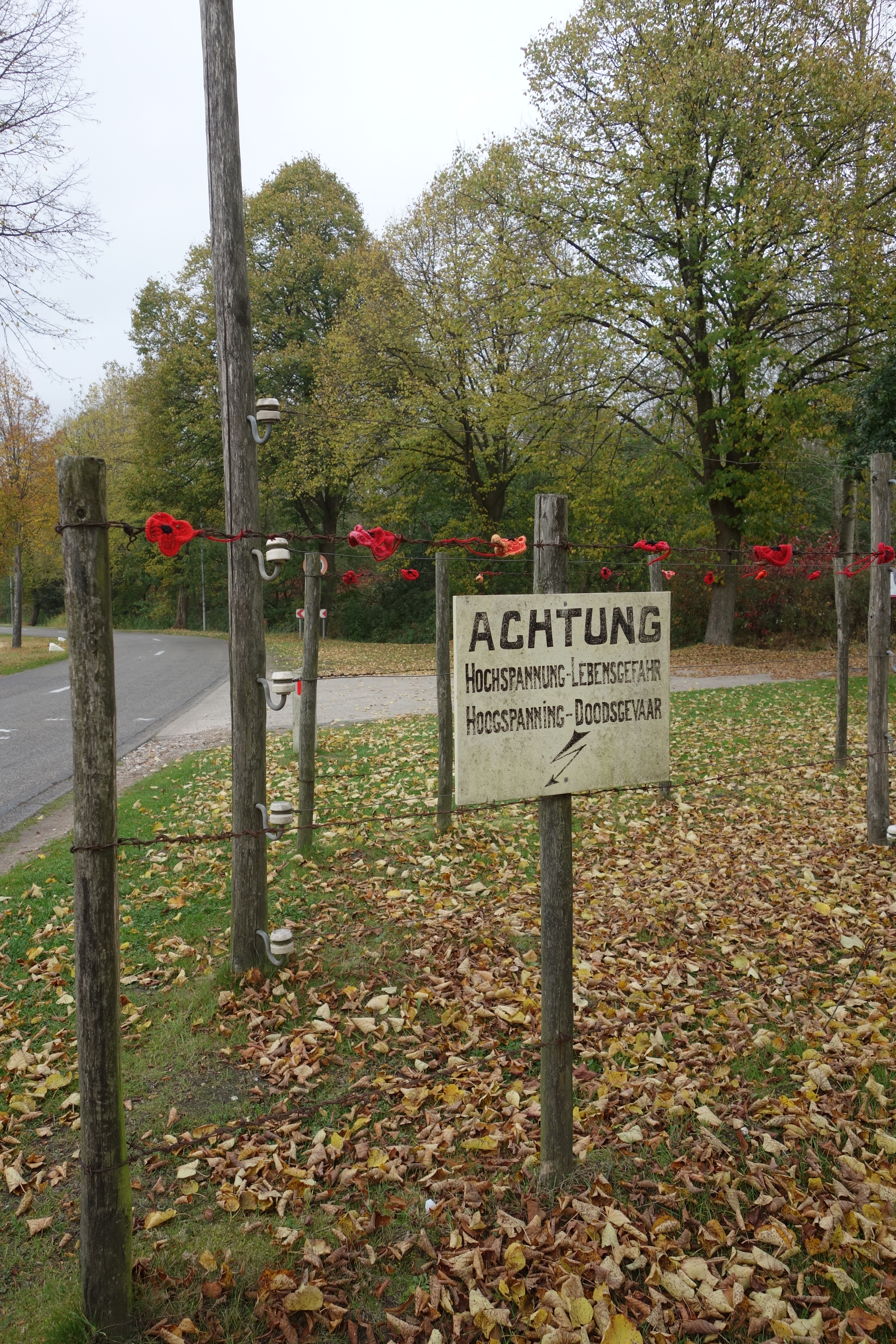
Tiny remainder of the Wire of Death

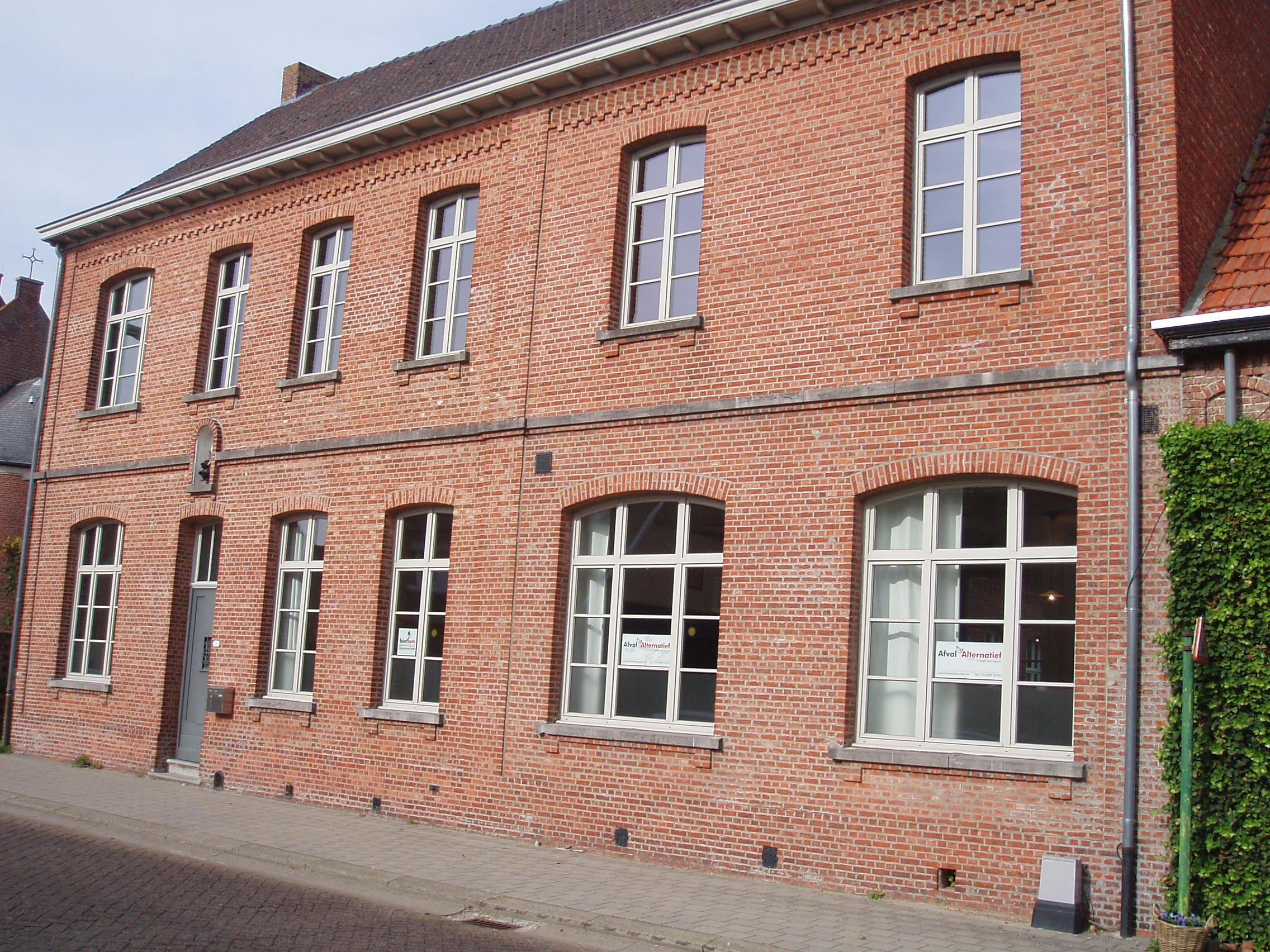
Kindergarten

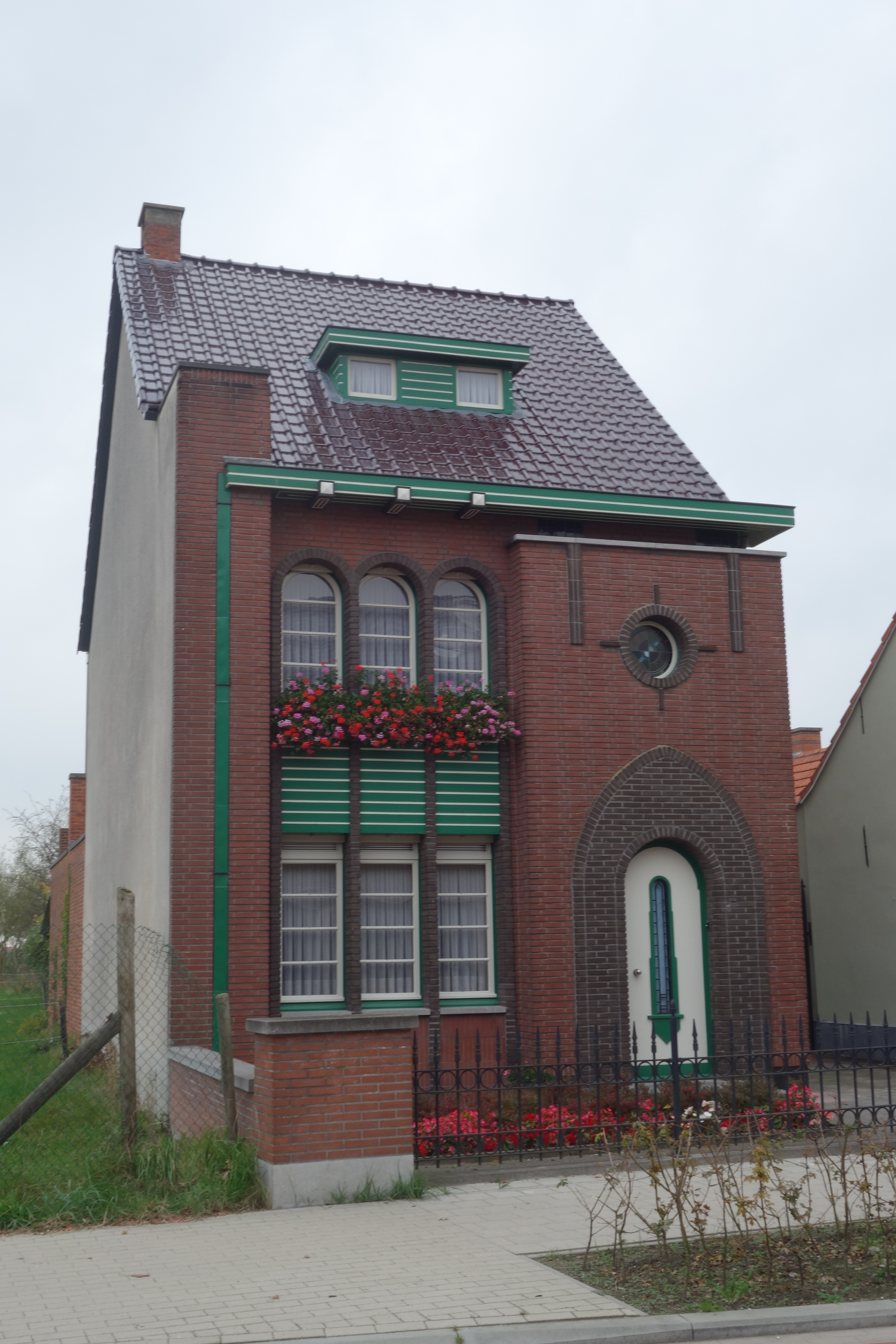
House in Zondereigen
