= Wire of Death =

Electrified border fence between Belgium and the Netherlands

Coordinates: 51°16′56″N 5°31′41″E

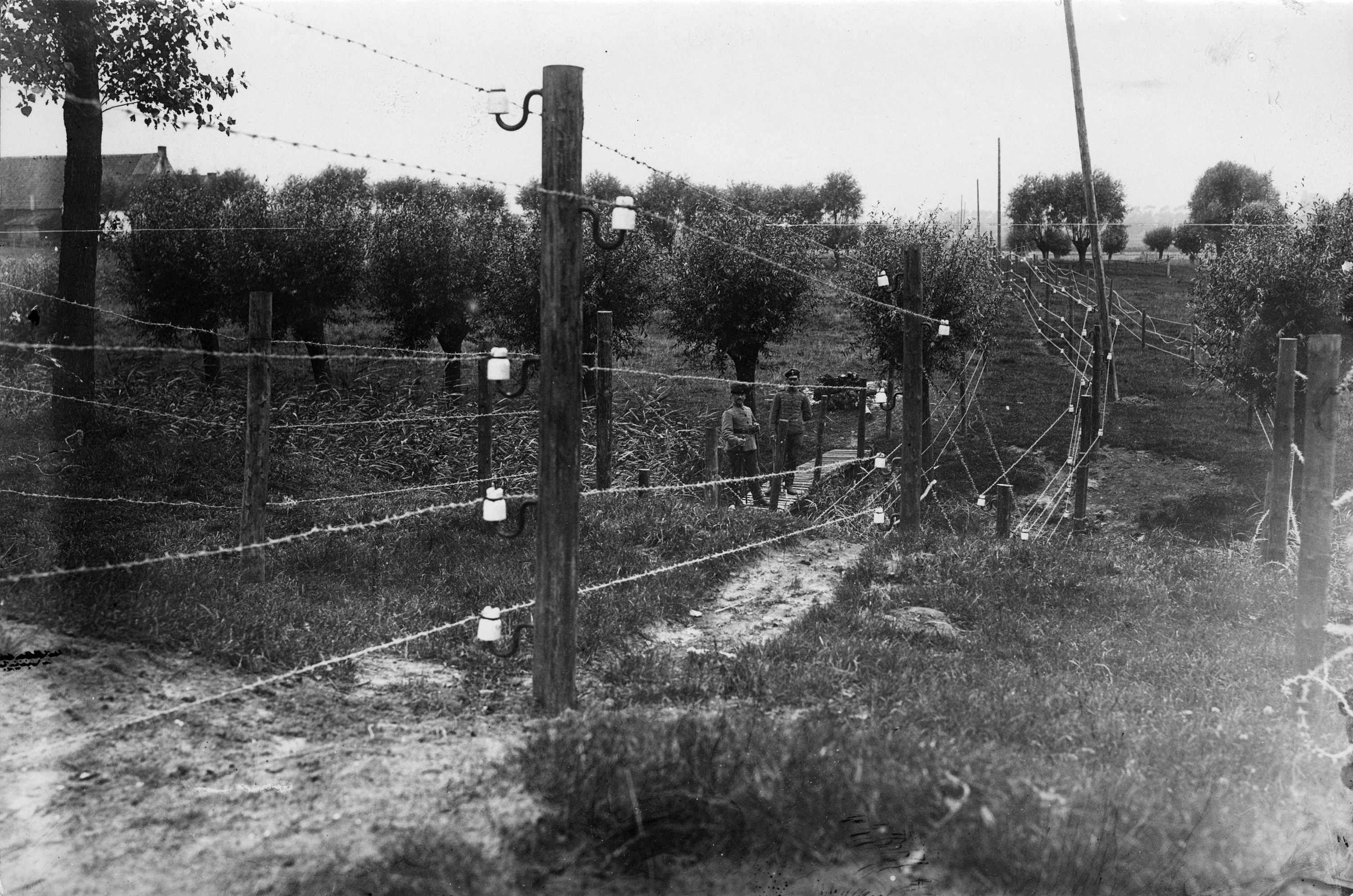
View of the Wire of Death from Sluis.

The Wire of Death (Dutch: Dodendraad, German: Todesdraht, French: Fil de la mort) was a lethal electric fence created by the German military to control the Dutch–Belgian frontier after the occupation of Belgium during the First World War.

== Terminology ==
The name 'Wire of Death' is an English rendition of one of its popular Dutch names, Dodendraad, which literally means "Death wire". As the war continued and more and more victims fell to the electric fence, it became known as simply De Draad meaning "The Wire". To the German authorities it was officially known as the Grenzhochspannungshindernis ("High Voltage Border Obstacle").

== Background ==
As Germany invaded neutral Belgium, Belgians began to cross the border to the Netherlands en masse. In 1914 one million Belgian refugees were already in the Netherlands, but throughout the war, refugees kept trying to cross the border. Many wanted to escape German occupation, others wanted to join their relatives who had already fled, and some wanted to take part in the war and chose this route to reach the forces on the Western Front.

Many of the refugees trying to get to France through the Netherlands and the United Kingdom to enlist in the Allied armies, were encouraged by Albert I of Belgium and Cardinal Mercier to defend the last remaining unoccupied Belgian territory.

Therefore, the Germans decided to build the wire to prevent these volunteers as well as spies from crossing the Belgian-Dutch border and reaching the British secret service in Rotterdam.

The Belgian government also kept a post office in the unoccupied Belgian Baarle-Hertog, a small enclave fully inside Dutch territory a few kilometres from the rest of the Dutch-Belgian border.

== Construction ==
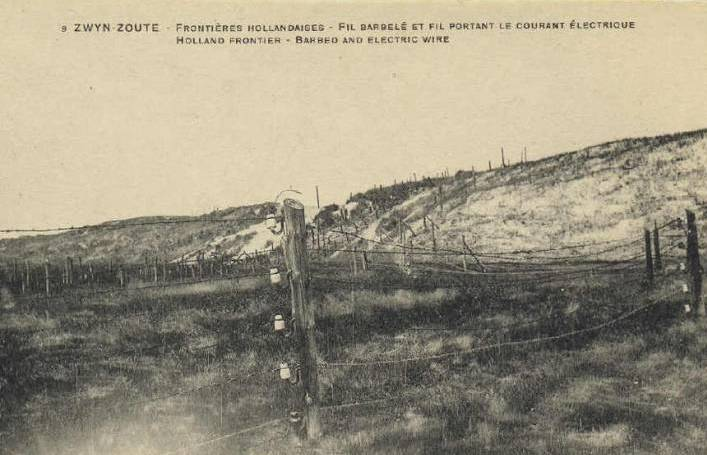
The end of the wire near the Scheldt.

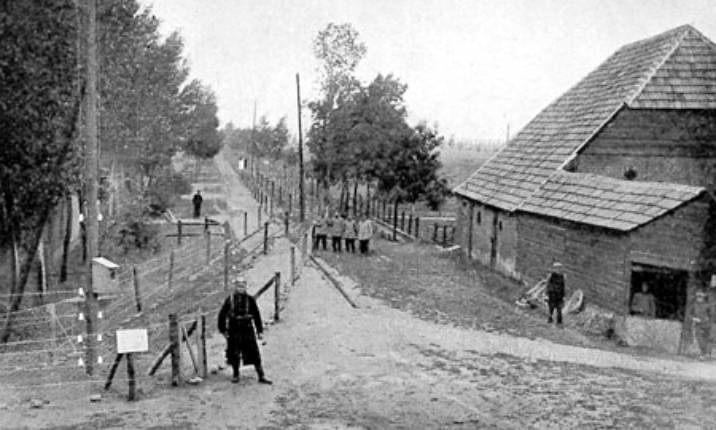
The wire near a Belgian farm, including a German patrol.

Construction began in the spring of 1915 and consisted of over 200 km (125 mi) of 2,000-volt wire with a height ranging from 1.5 to about 3 m (5 to about 10 ft) spanning the length of the Dutch-Belgian border from Aix-la-Chapelle to the River Scheldt. Within 100–500 m (110–550 yd) of the wire, anyone who was not able to officially explain their presence was summarily executed, although the German border guards took care not to fire into the Netherlands, which was officially neutral.

== Dutch reaction ==
The Dutch government did not protest the construction of the Wire. For the Netherlands, it was a sign that its neutrality was being recognized, and the Dutch government did everything in its power to preserve that neutrality. Any actions that could be seen as cooperation were avoided as much as possible. The Wire did emphasize to the Dutch people that there was a dire situation of war right outside the Netherlands during the Great War, and so much so that many people were willing to flee from it at the risk of their very lives. From the start of the fence's construction, Dutch citizens were warned of the deadly consequences of touching the Wire. Warning signs had also been posted on the Dutch side of the border, saying: Hoogspanning – Levensgevaar (High voltage – Lethal Danger). Despite the fact that several Dutch citizens were also killed by the Wire, the Netherlands never objected to it.

For the Dutch, only the field police were allowed to come close to the border and thus close to the Wire. Strict action was taken against those who tried to cross the Wire. Arrested deserters were interned in the many camps in the Netherlands. Smugglers, who were very active due to the large shortages in both countries, were prosecuted by the courts.

== Result and legacy ==
The number of victims is estimated to range between 2,000 and 3,000 people. Local newspapers in the Southern Netherlands carried almost daily reports about people who were 'lightninged to death'. However, many also succeeded in getting over the fence, often by employing dangerous or creative methods, ranging from the use of very large ladders and tunnels to pole vaulting and binding porcelain plates onto shoes in an attempt to insulate themselves.

The wire also separated families and friends as the Dutch–Belgian border where Dutch and Flemings (Dutch-speaking Belgians), despite living in different states, often intermarried or otherwise socialized with each other. Funeral processions used to walk to the fence and halt there, to give relatives and friends on the other side the opportunity to pray and say farewell. The (neutral) Dutch government, which initially did not object, protested the wire later on several occasions after its existence caused public outrage in the Netherlands. The great number of fatalities not only resulted in a sharp increase in Dutch anti-German sentiment (in a country which had up until then been mostly hostile to Britain due to the Second Boer War) but also made smuggling goods in the border area much more dangerous and therefore more lucrative for local smugglers.

The fence did not completely follow the border and did not cross rivers. The Germans also allowed locals to pass through for church services, on market days and during harvest. In October 1918 the Germans opened the border to allow refugees from France and Belgium through rather than clog up German lines of communication in Belgium. At the end of the war, the Kaiser crossed the border from Belgium into the neutral Netherlands to take refuge there.

Immediately after the signing of the armistice in November 1918, the power plants around the wire were shut down and locals on both sides of the border soon destroyed the much-hated fence. Today all that remains of the original wire are some warning signs; however in some areas certain stretches have been reconstructed such as near Hamont-Achel, Zondereigen, Molenbeersel and between Achtmaal and Nieuwmoer in nature reserve "De Maatjes" by observation post "De Klot".

== Bibliography ==
- Abbenhuis, Maartje M. (2006). The Art of Staying Neutral: the Netherlands in the First World War, 1914-1918. Amsterdam: Amsterdam University Press. pp. 164–9. ISBN 9789053568187.
- Van Waesberghe, Steven (2001). Smokkel in het Land van Waas tijdens de Eerste Wereldoorlog (Licentiaat thesis). Universiteit Gent.
