= Ulicoten =

- Village
- Location in the province of North Brabant in the Netherlands Ulicoten (Netherlands)
- Coordinates: 51°27′25″N 4°51′25″E
- Country: Netherlands
- Province: North Brabant
- Municipality: Baarle-Nassau

Area
  - Total: 21.30 km^{2} (8.22 sq mi)
- Elevation: 18 m (59 ft)

Population (2021)
  - Total: 1,090
  - Density: 51.2/km^{2} (133/sq mi)
- Time zone: UTC+1 (CET)
  - Summer (DST): UTC+2 (CEST)
- Postal code: 5113
- Dialing code: 013

Ulicoten is a village in the Dutch province of North Brabant. It is a part of the municipality of Baarle-Nassau and is situated about 16 kilometres (9.9 mi) south of Breda.

== History ==
The village was first mentioned in 1422 as Ulencoete, and means "little house/farm on land near water"

The Roman Catholic church was built during the early 19th century, but destroyed in 1944. In 1950, a new church was built with two towers.

Ulicoten was home to 407 people in 1840.

It has a single primary school, Bernardusschool.

== Gallery ==
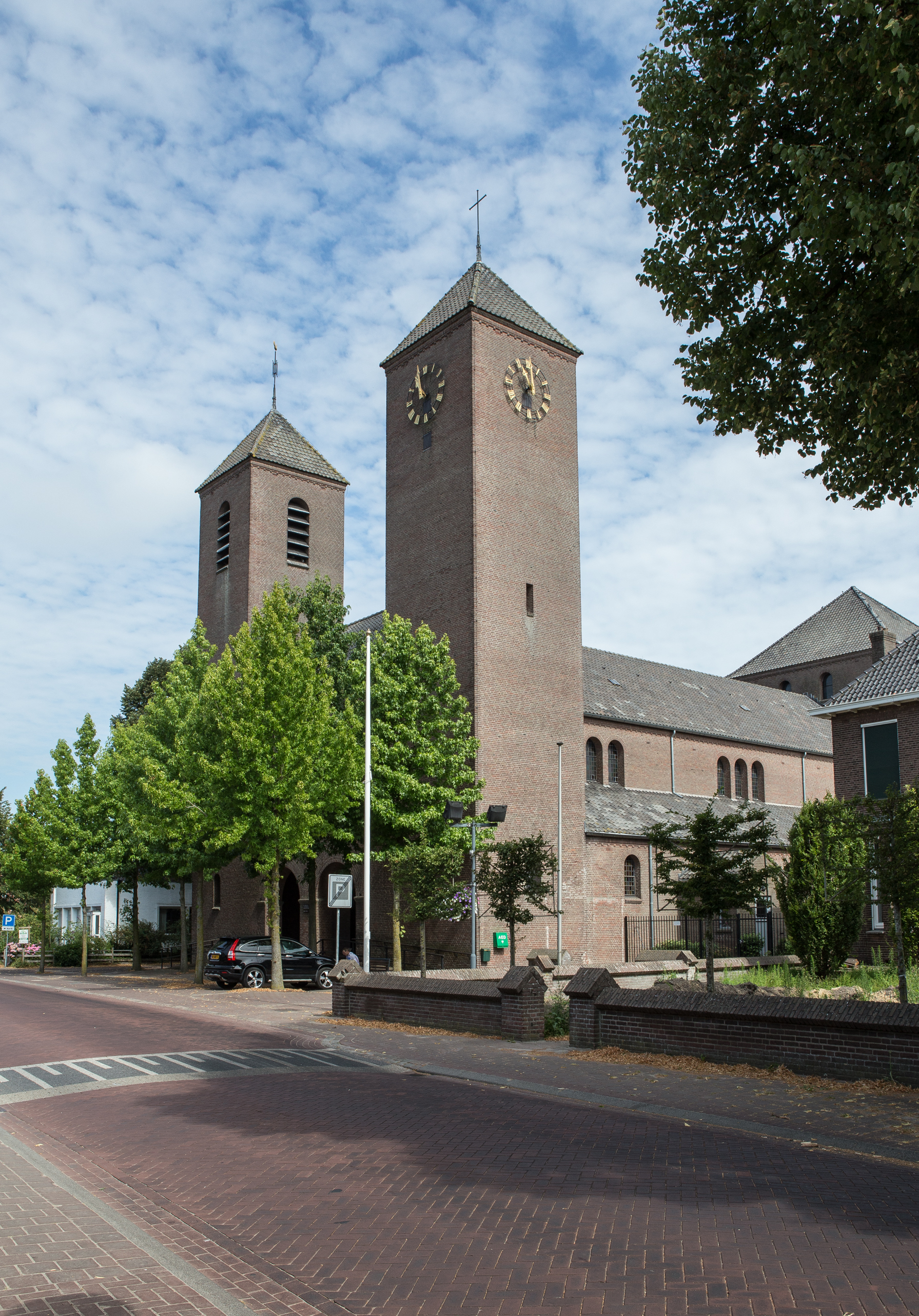
Catholic church of Ulicoten

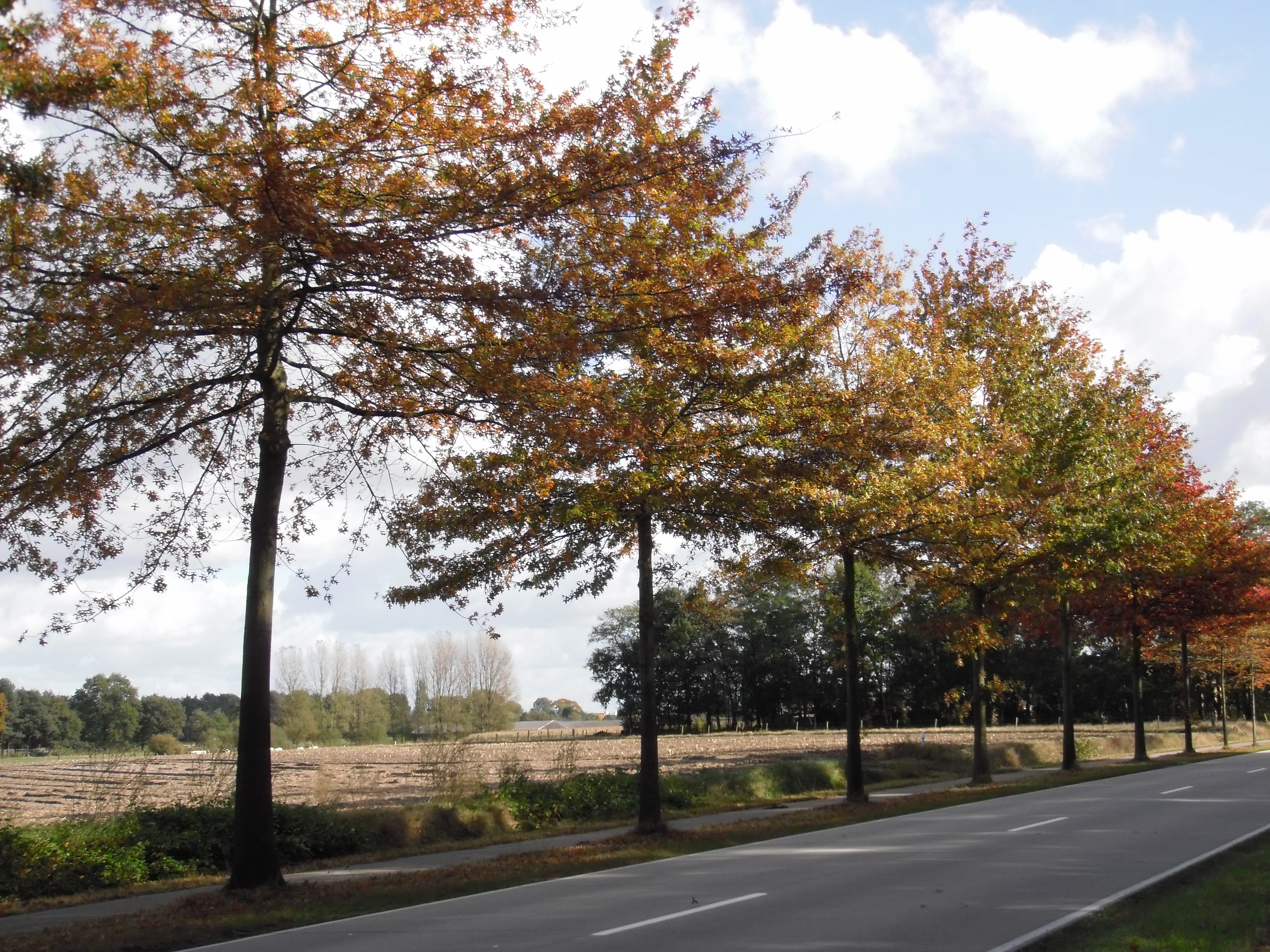
Street view
