= Treaty of Maastricht (1843) =

1843 treaty between Belgium and Nederlands

- Type: Bilateral treaty
- Signed: 8 August 1843
- Location: Maastricht, Netherlands
- Original signatories: Belgium; Netherlands
- Ratifiers: Belgium; Netherlands

The Treaty of Maastricht, signed in 1843 by Belgium and the Netherlands four years after the Treaty of London established Belgian independence, finally settled the border between the two countries.

== Border enclaves ==
Inability to decide a clear line of demarcation in Baarle-Hertog resulted in the division of the disputed territory into 5732 separate parcels of land. They formed part of a very complicated frontier, which sometimes passes through houses and has tiny enclaves because of land ownership dating back to the 12th century. A few of the Belgian enclaves within Dutch territory even have Dutch counter-enclaves within them.

Part of the left bank of the Meuse, near Maastricht, was returned to the Netherlands.

== See also ==
- Iron Rhine and Iron Rhine Treaty of 1873
- Maastricht Treaty of the European Union
