= Baarle-Hertog =

Municipality in Flemish Community, Belgium, Belgian territory of Baarle

- Municipality
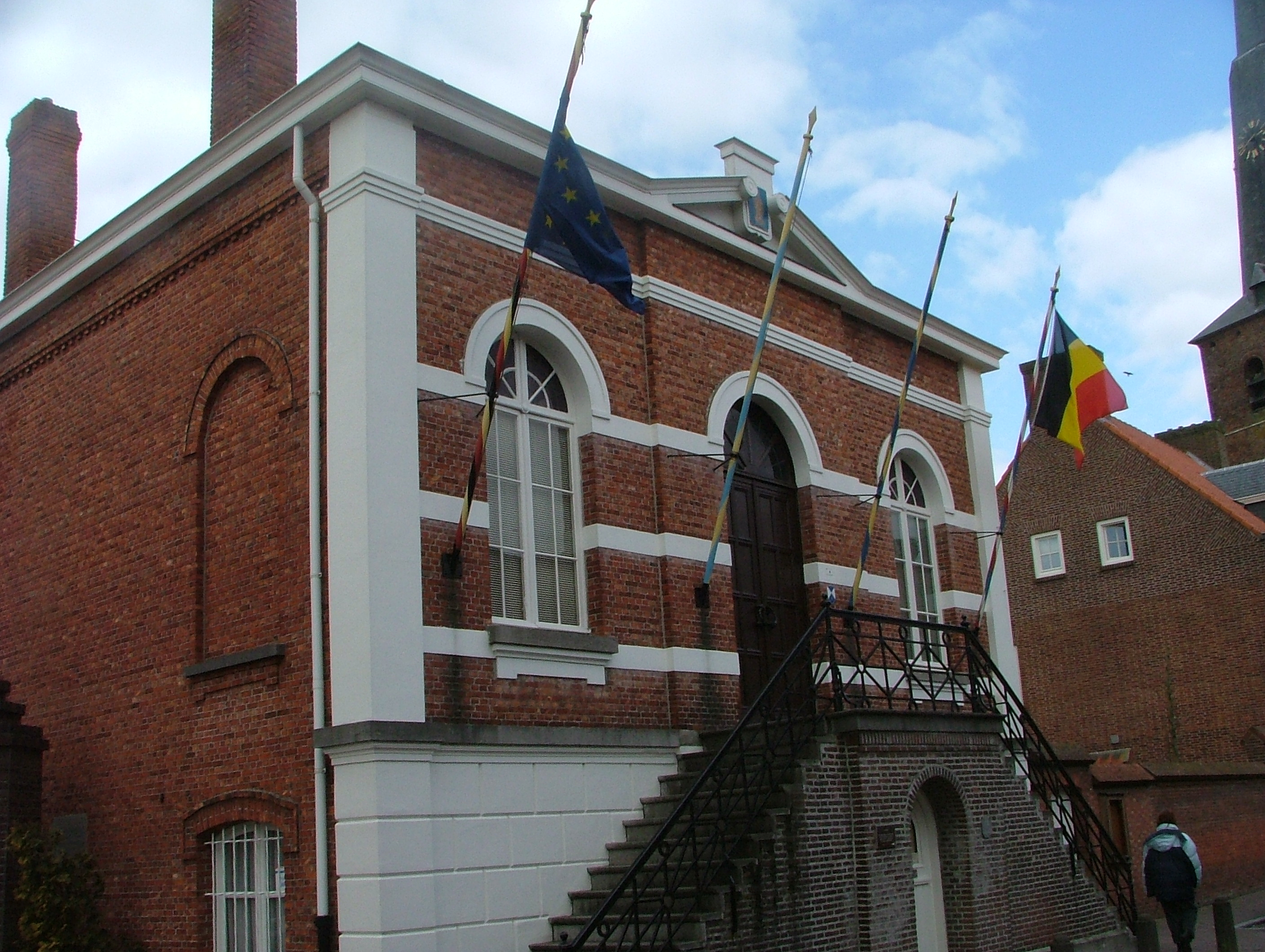
- Former town hall

- Flag Coat of arms

- Location of Baarle-Hertog in the province of Antwerp
- Interactive map of Baarle-Hertog
- Location in Belgium
- Coordinates: 51°27′N 04°56′E
- Country: Belgium
- Community: Flemish Community
- Region: Flemish Region
- Province: Antwerp
- Arrondissement: Turnhout

Government
  - Mayor: Philip LOOTS (N-VA)
  - Governing parties: N-VA, Forum+

Area
  - Total: 7.41 km^{2} (2.86 sq mi)

Population (2025-01-01)
  - Total: 3,083
  - Density: 416/km^{2} (1,080/sq mi)
- Postal codes: 2387
- NIS code: 13002
- Area codes: 014
- Website: Official website

Baarle-Hertog (Dutch pronunciation: [ˌbaːrlə ˈɦɛrtɔx]; French: Baerle-Duc, pronounced [baʁl(ə)dyk]) is a Flemish municipality of Belgium, much of which consists of a number of small Belgian exclaves fully surrounded by the Netherlands.

Parts of Baarle-Hertog are surrounded by the Dutch province of North Brabant, but it is part of the Belgian province of Antwerp. As of 2021, it had a population of 2,935. The total area is 7.48 square kilometres (2.89 square miles).

== Geography ==
=== Border with Baarle-Nassau ===
Map showing the enclaves of Baarle-Hertog

Baarle-Hertog is noted for its complicated borders with Baarle-Nassau, Netherlands.

The border's complexity results from a number of medieval treaties, agreements, land-swaps and sales between the Lords of Breda and the Dukes of Brabant. Generally speaking, predominantly agricultural or built environments became constituents of Brabant and other parts devolved to Breda. These distributions were ratified and clarified as a part of the border settlements agreed under the Treaty of Maastricht in 1843. The tight integration of the European Union and in particular the Schengen Agreement have made many of the practicalities of the situation substantially simpler since the 1990s.

In total, the municipality of Baarle-Hertog consists of 26 separate parcels of land. Four are linked to other Belgian municipalities, from west to east: the Baalbrugse Bemden, a strip of land along the Merkske, Zondereigen-Ginhoven and an area near Weelde-Station. The largest single section, Zondereigen (named after its main hamlet), is located within mainland Belgium on the contiguous Dutch-Belgian border (north of the town of Merksplas). In addition to this, there are 22 Belgian exclaves fully within the Netherlands. There are also seven Dutch enclaves within the Belgian exclaves (i.e., counter-exclaves) that are part of the territory of the Netherlands. Six of these Dutch enclaves are located within the largest Belgian exclave, and a seventh in the second-largest Belgian exclave. An eighth Dutch exclave is located near Ginhoven.

During the First World War, this situation meant that the Imperial German Army could not occupy these parts of Belgium without crossing the Netherlands, which the Dutch government did not allow. Thus, these pieces of Belgium became a place where refugees could safely stay. A clandestine radio transmitter was smuggled in and from there worked with the Belgian resistance. The Dutch government fenced off these areas and controlled access in or out of them, building a church and school for the Belgian people who were effectively stranded within the enclaves. This situation did not exist in the Second World War, as both countries were occupied by Nazi Germany.

Some houses in the town of Baarle-Hertog/Baarle-Nassau are divided between the two countries. At one time, differences between laws meant restaurants in the Netherlands had to close earlier than those in Belgium. For some restaurants directly on the border, this simply meant that customers had to move to a table on the Belgian side. In 2020, restrictions due to the COVID-19 pandemic differed between the two countries; for instance, preventing a Belgian citizen living metres away from an open Dutch bar from patronising it.

Many fireworks shops are found in Baarle-Hertog, as Belgian laws controlling the sale of fireworks are more lenient than those of the Netherlands. Many Dutch tourists come to Baarle-Hertog to buy fireworks to celebrate the New Year.

Two villages in the municipality, Zondereigen and Ginhoven, are located in the main territory of Belgium.

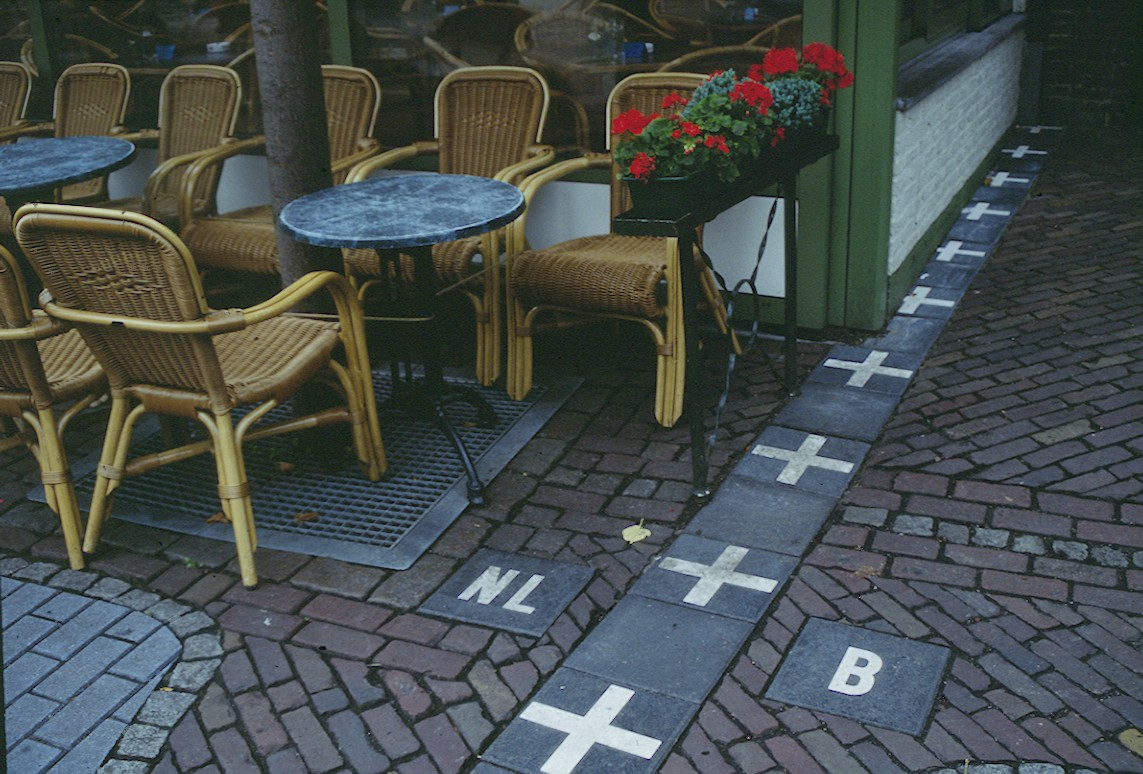
Café in Baarle-Nassau, showing border between Belgium and the Netherlands

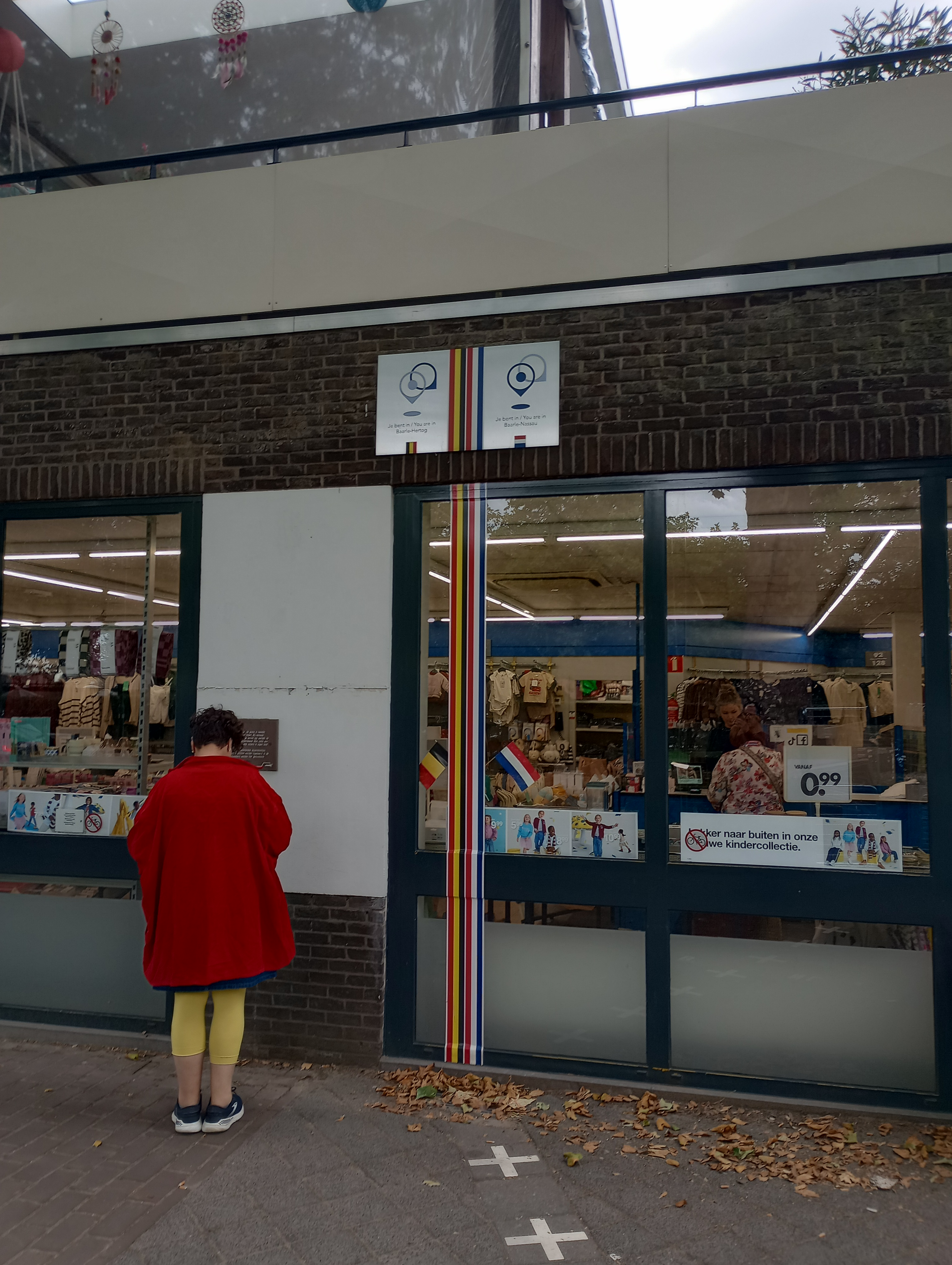
Border of Baarle-Hertog (Belgium) and Baarle-Nassau (Netherlands) running up a wall and dividing a shop; a woman in Belgian national colours stands on the Belgian side.

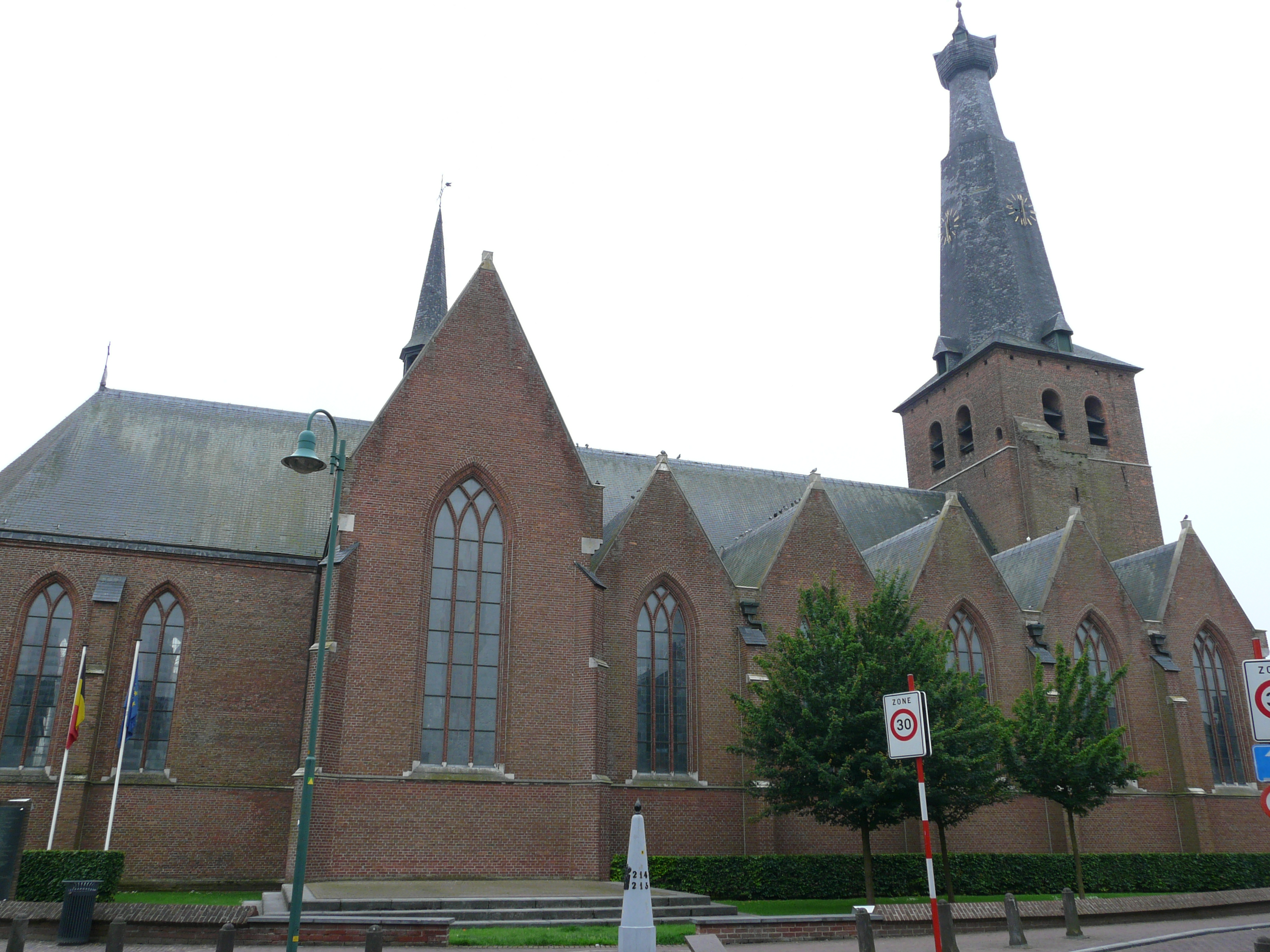
Church of Saint Remigius

=== List of enclaves ===
==== Netherlands enclaves ====
These are all part of Baarle-Nassau municipality.

Serial no. and local name	Area (ha)	area acre	Notes
(Netherlands) N1, De Loversche Akkers – De Tommelsche Akkers	5.3667	13.2615	Counter-enclave surrounded by Belgian exclave H1, in Baarle-Hertog; contains a mix of dwellings and farmland; boundary of N1 and H1 runs through one building.
(Netherlands) N2, De Tommelsche Akkers	1.3751	3.3981	Counter-enclave surrounded by Belgian exclave H1, in Baarle-Hertog; contains 8 dwellings.
(Netherlands) N3, De Tommelsche Akkers	0.2863	0.7075	Counter-enclave surrounded by Belgian exclave H1, in Baarle-Hertog; boundary of N3 and H1 bisects the loading dock of a liquor store.
(Netherlands) N4, De Rethsche Akkers	1.2324	3.0454	Counter-enclave surrounded by Belgian exclave H1, in Baarle-Hertog; boundary of N4 and H1 runs through a warehouse, with vacant Dutch land to the rear of the warehouse.
(Netherlands) N5, De Rethsche Akkers	1.9212	4.7475	Counter-enclave surrounded by Belgian exclave H1, in Baarle-Hertog; boundary of N5 and H1 runs through a furniture showroom, a shed and a barn.
(Netherlands) N6, Gierle Straat	1.4527	3.5898	Counter-enclave surrounded by Belgian exclave H1, in Baarle-Hertog; consists of farmland with two buildings.
(Netherlands) N7, De Kastelein	0.5812	1.4363	Counter-enclave surrounded by Belgian Oordeel exclave H8, in Baarle-Hertog; occupies part of a field.
(Netherlands) N8, Vossenberg	2.8528	7.0496	Farmland enclave situated within Zondereigen, Belgium, less than 50 meters south of the Dutch border.

==== Belgian enclaves ====
These are all part of Baarle-Hertog municipality, and are surrounded by Baarle-Nassau municipality (Netherlands).

Serial no. and local name	Area (ha)	area acre	Notes
(Belgium) H1, Aen het Klooster Straetje - Hoofdbraek - Loveren - De Boschcovensche Akkers - De Loversche Akkers - De Tommelsche Akkers - De Tommel - De Gierle Straat - De Reth - De Rethsche Akkers - Het Dorp - De Kapel Akkers - De Kastelein	153.6448	379.6717	Forms a quadripoint with enclave H2; largest Belgian exclave; encompasses six Dutch enclaves; consists of dwellings for the most part, with outlying farmland and an industrial area; boundary runs through numerous buildings; contains a portion of the former Turnhout-Tilburg rail line, now a cycle path.
(Belgium) H2, De Rethsche Akkers	2.4116	5.9594	Consists of farmland with a single point of connection (quadripoint) between enclaves H1 and H2 in the middle of a corn field.
(Belgium) H3, De Rethsche Akkers	0.3428	0.8471	Occupies part of a field; boundary runs through a shed in one instance.
(Belgium) H4, De Rethsche Akkers	1.476	3.6474	Consists of farmland; boundary runs through a house and three sheds.
(Belgium) H5, De Kapel Akkers	0.9245	2.2846	Consists of farmland with a dwelling.
(Belgium) H6, Hoofdbraek	1.7461	4.3148	Mixed land usage; boundary runs through a warehouse/factory.
(Belgium) H7, De Loversche Akkers	0.2469	0.6102	Boundary runs through two dwellings, including the middle of one front door (giving it two house numbers: Loveren 2, Baarle-Hertog / Loveren 19, Baarle-Nassau).
(Belgium) H8, Boschcoven - De Kastelein - De Oordelsche Straat	41.8781	103.485	Second-largest Belgian exclave, contains a mix of dwellings and farmland; boundary runs through a barn, a dwelling and two businesses.
(Belgium) H9, De Kapel Akkers	0.4005	0.9897	Boundary runs through a printing factory/warehouse in an industrial area.
(Belgium) H10, De Oordelsche Straat	0.65	1.6063	Consists of farmland.
(Belgium) H11, De Oordelsche Straat	0.93	2.2982	Consists of farmland.
(Belgium) H12, Boschcoven	0.2822	0.6974	Consists of farmland.
(Belgium) H13, Boschcoven	1.5346	3.7922	Boundary runs through about 20 dwellings.
(Belgium) H14, Boschcoven	0.7193	1.7774	Boundary runs through about 13 dwellings.
(Belgium) H15, Boschcoven	1.7211	4.2531	Boundary runs through about 16 dwellings.
(Belgium) H16, Keizershoek - Oordelsche Straat	4.4252	10.9352	Boundary runs through a house and three sheds; inside one of the sheds, the linear boundary changes direction three times
(Belgium) H17, Moleriet Heide	14.9248	36.8807	Rural area containing a portion of the former Turnhout-Tilburg rail line, now a cycle path.
(Belgium) H18, De Manke Gooren	2.9247	7.2273	Consists of farmland.
(Belgium) H19, De Peruiters	0.6851	1.693	Consists of several ponds and a field.
(Belgium) H20, Wurstenbosch - Vossenberg	1.1681	2.8865	Consists of farmland.
(Belgium) H21, Baelbrugsche Beemden	1.1845	2.9271	Consists of farmland.
(Belgium) H22, De Wit Hagen	0.2632	0.6504	South of the village of Ulicoten; occupies part of a field; nationality was contested from the 1830s until 1995 (remained unallocated to either country in boundary treaty of 26 April 1974)

=== Climate ===
Climate data for Baarle-Hertog (1991−2020 normals)
Month	Jan	Feb	Mar	Apr	May	Jun	Jul	Aug	Sep	Oct	Nov	Dec	Year
Mean daily maximum °C (°F)	6.3 (43.3)	7.4 (45.3)	11.0 (51.8)	15.4 (59.7)	18.9 (66.0)	21.6 (70.9)	23.6 (74.5)	23.4 (74.1)	19.8 (67.6)	15.1 (59.2)	10.1 (50.2)	6.7 (44.1)	14.9 (58.8)
Daily mean °C (°F)	3.6 (38.5)	4.0 (39.2)	6.8 (44.2)	10.1 (50.2)	13.8 (56.8)	16.7 (62.1)	18.7 (65.7)	18.3 (64.9)	15.1 (59.2)	11.2 (52.2)	7.1 (44.8)	4.2 (39.6)	10.8 (51.4)
Mean daily minimum °C (°F)	0.9 (33.6)	0.8 (33.4)	2.6 (36.7)	4.8 (40.6)	8.7 (47.7)	11.8 (53.2)	13.8 (56.8)	13.2 (55.8)	10.3 (50.5)	7.3 (45.1)	4.1 (39.4)	1.6 (34.9)	6.7 (44.1)
Average precipitation mm (inches)	75.8 (2.98)	69.9 (2.75)	59.3 (2.33)	45.3 (1.78)	62.3 (2.45)	76.1 (3.00)	84.5 (3.33)	83.2 (3.28)	71.7 (2.82)	73.9 (2.91)	83.6 (3.29)	96.6 (3.80)	882.2 (34.73)
Average precipitation days (≥ 1.0 mm)	12.9	12.0	10.8	8.9	9.9	10.3	11.3	11.0	10.4	11.2	13.2	14.7	136.6
Mean monthly sunshine hours	63	81	136	190	217	215	220	205	162	117	69	53	1,726
Source: Royal Meteorological Institute

== Education ==
Baarle-Hertog has two elementary schools: De Vlinder and De Horizon.

It shares, with Baarle-Nassau, a joint library with Belgian and Dutch staff.

== Notable inhabitants ==
- Petrus Christus, 15th-century painter

== See also ==
- Büsingen am Hochrhein, an exclave of Germany surrounded by Switzerland
- Campione d'Italia, an exclave of Italy surrounded by Switzerland
- Llívia, an exclave of Spain surrounded by France
- India–Bangladesh enclaves, 173 former enclaves (not including counter-enclaves)
- The City & The City, a novel about two fictional co-existing city states
