= Merksplas =

- Municipality
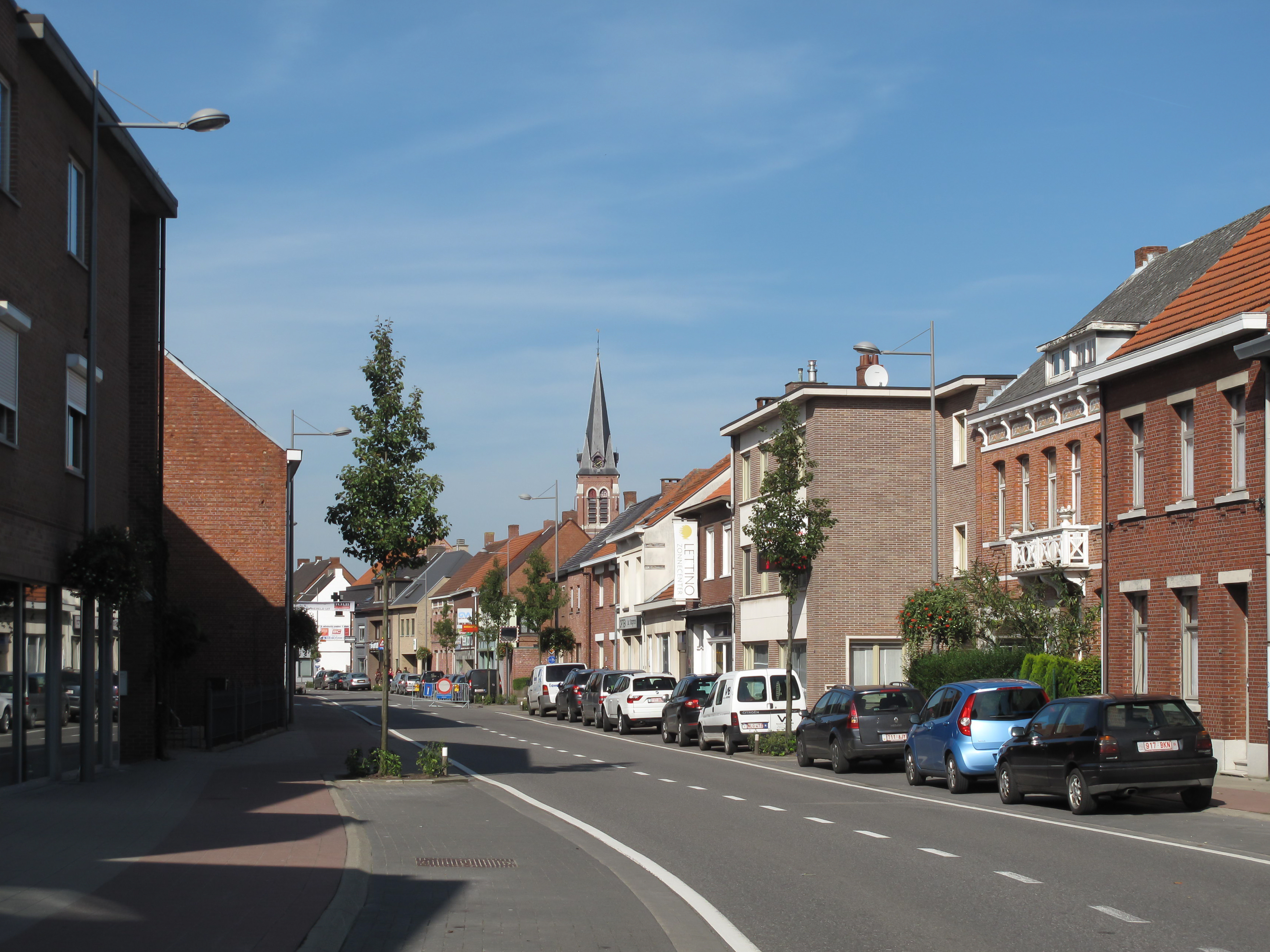

- Flag Coat of arms

- Location of Merksplas in the province of Antwerp
- Interactive map of Merksplas
- Location in Belgium
- Coordinates: 51°22′N 04°52′E
- Country: Belgium
- Community: Flemish Community
- Region: Flemish Region
- Province: Antwerp
- Arrondissement: Turnhout

Government
  - Mayor: Frank Wilrycx
  - Governing party: LM (Leefbaar Merksplas)

Area
  - Total: 44.6 km^{2} (17.2 sq mi)

Population (2020-01-01)
  - Total: 8,588
  - Density: 193/km^{2} (499/sq mi)
- Postal codes: 2330
- NIS code: 13023
- Area codes: 014, 03
- Website: www.merksplas.be

Merksplas (Dutch pronunciation: [ˈmɛr(ə)ksplɑs]) is a municipality located in the Belgian province of Antwerp. The municipality comprises only the town of Merksplas proper. In 2021, Merksplas had a total population of 8,616. The total area is 44.56 km^{2}.
