= Octave van Rysselberghe =

Belgian architect

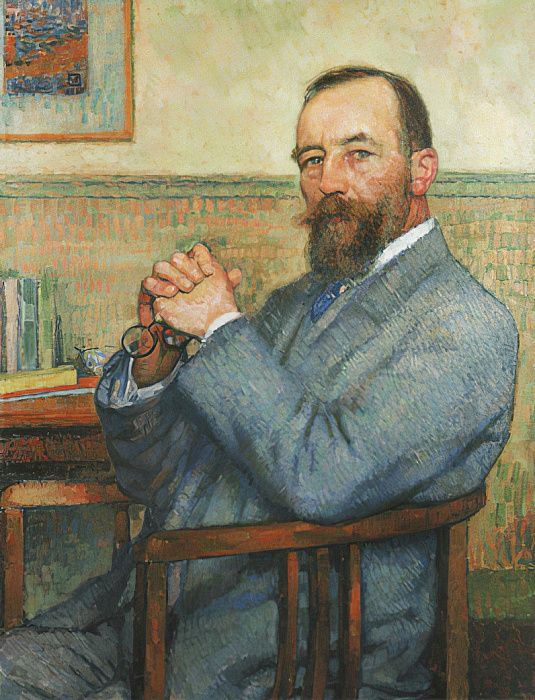
- Portrait of Octave van Rysselberghe by Théo van Rysselberghe
- Born: Octavius Josephus van Rysselberghe; 22 July 1855; Minderhout, Belgium
- Died: 30 March 1929 (aged 73); Nice, France
- Occupation: Architect
- Relatives: Théo van Rysselberghe (brother)
- Buildings: Grand Hôtel Bellevue in Westende; Hôtel Goblet d'Alviella in Saint-Gilles; Hôtel Otlet in Brussels; Hôtel de Brouckère in Brussels; Van Rysselberghe House in Ixelles

Octave van Rysselberghe (22 July 1855, Minderhout – 30 March 1929, Nice) was a Belgian architect of the Art Nouveau period. He is one of the representatives of the architectural renewal that characterized the end of the 19th century, with Victor Horta, Paul Hankar and Henry Van de Velde.

== Biography ==
Octavius Josephus van Rysselberghe was born in Minderhout, near Antwerp, on 22 July 1855.

He was the older brother of the neo-impressionist painter Théo van Rysselberghe (1862–1926) and the younger brother of fellow architect Charles van Rysselberghe and scientist François van Rysselberghe, pioneer of meteorology and long-distance telephony.

He studied at the Royal Academy of Fine Arts in Ghent and was trained by Adolphe Pauli in the neoclassical tradition, inspired by the Italian Renaissance. In 1875, together with Ernest Allard, he won second prize in the Prix de Rome competition for architecture. At the next edition for architecture, in 1879, he again took second prize, together with Eugène Dieltiens.

After a stay in Italy, he was a trainee with Joseph Poelaert as part of the construction of the Palais de Justice in Brussels before starting the construction of the Hôtel Goblet d'Alviella for the Count Goblet d'Alviella in 1882. Between 1882 and 1889 he built the Royal Observatory in Uccle, using eclectic and neoclassical styles. In 1893 he built a studio for his brother Théo van Rysselberghe in Saint Clair, France. He built an Art Nouveau house in Brussels, the Hôtel Otlet, in 1894. The interior design was done by Henry Van de Velde. He collaborated with Van de Velde also for the Hôtel de Brouckère in Brussels, likewise in a classic and sober Art Nouveau style.

Octave van Rysselberghe was soon regarded as one of the most important representatives of Art Nouveau in Belgium. From 1895 to 1905, he built tourist establishments for the Compagnie des Grands Hôtels Européens in Ostend, Cherbourg, Monte Carlo, Saint Petersburg and Tunis.

== Selected works ==
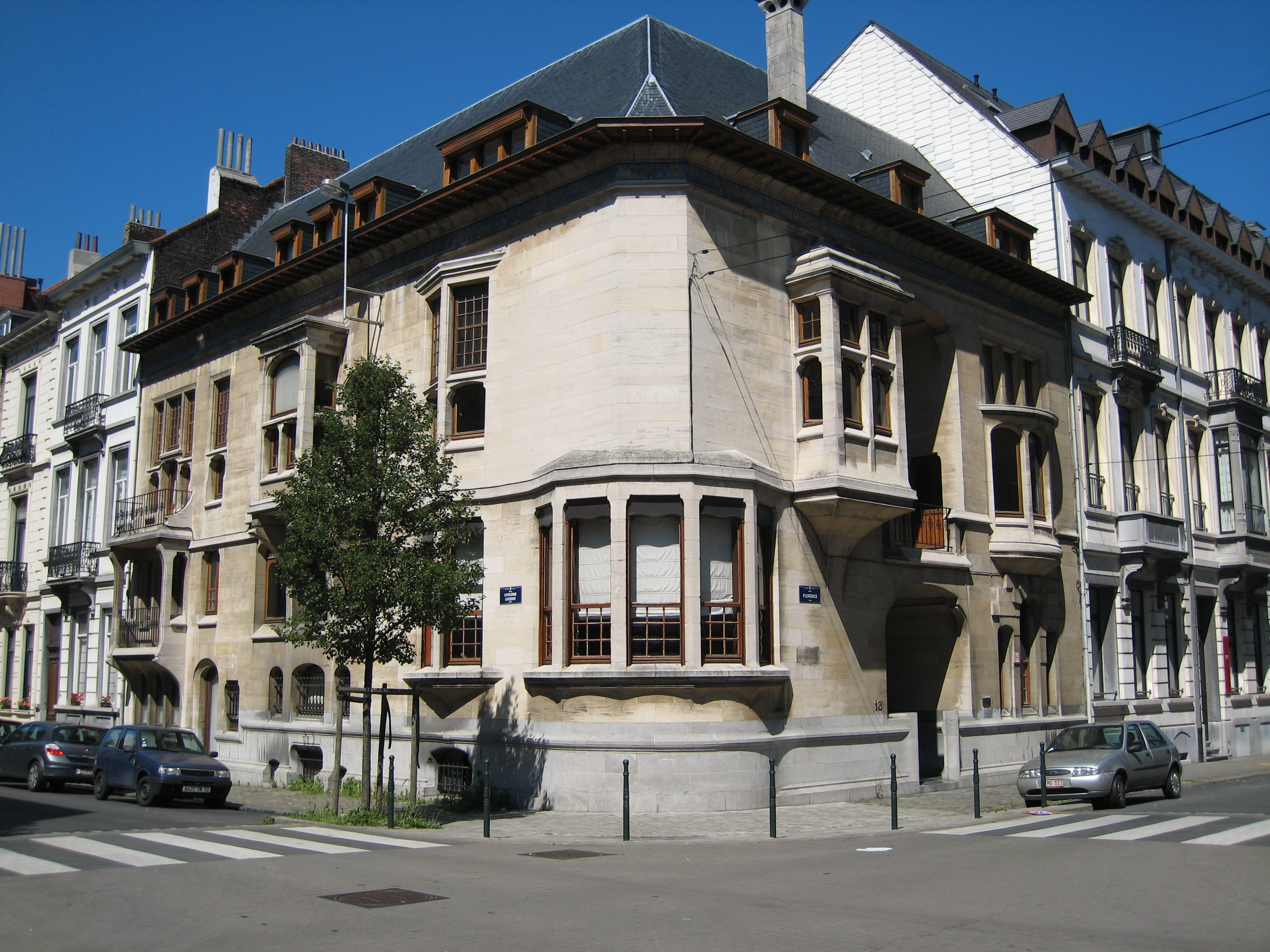
Hôtel Otlet, Brussels

- 1882: Hôtel Goblet d'Alviella in Saint-Gilles, Brussels, Belgium
- 1885: Winkelhuis in Ghent, Belgium
- 1894–98: Hôtel Otlet in Brussels, Belgium
- 1898: Hôtel de Brouckère in Brussels, Belgium
- 1906: Villa Le Pachy in Bellecourt, Belgium
- 1906: Concert hall of the Royal Conservatory of Ghent (current Miry Concert Hall)
- 1907: Villa Beukenhoek in Uccle, Belgium
- 1908: Residence Kreuzberg in Dudelange, Luxembourg
- 1909–11: Grand Hôtel Bellevue in Westende, Belgium
- 1910: Villa Le Pin in Le Lavandou, France
- 1910: Burgerhuis on Koningin Elisabethlaan in Ghent, Belgium
- 1912: Van Rysselberghe House in Ixelles, Brussels, Belgium
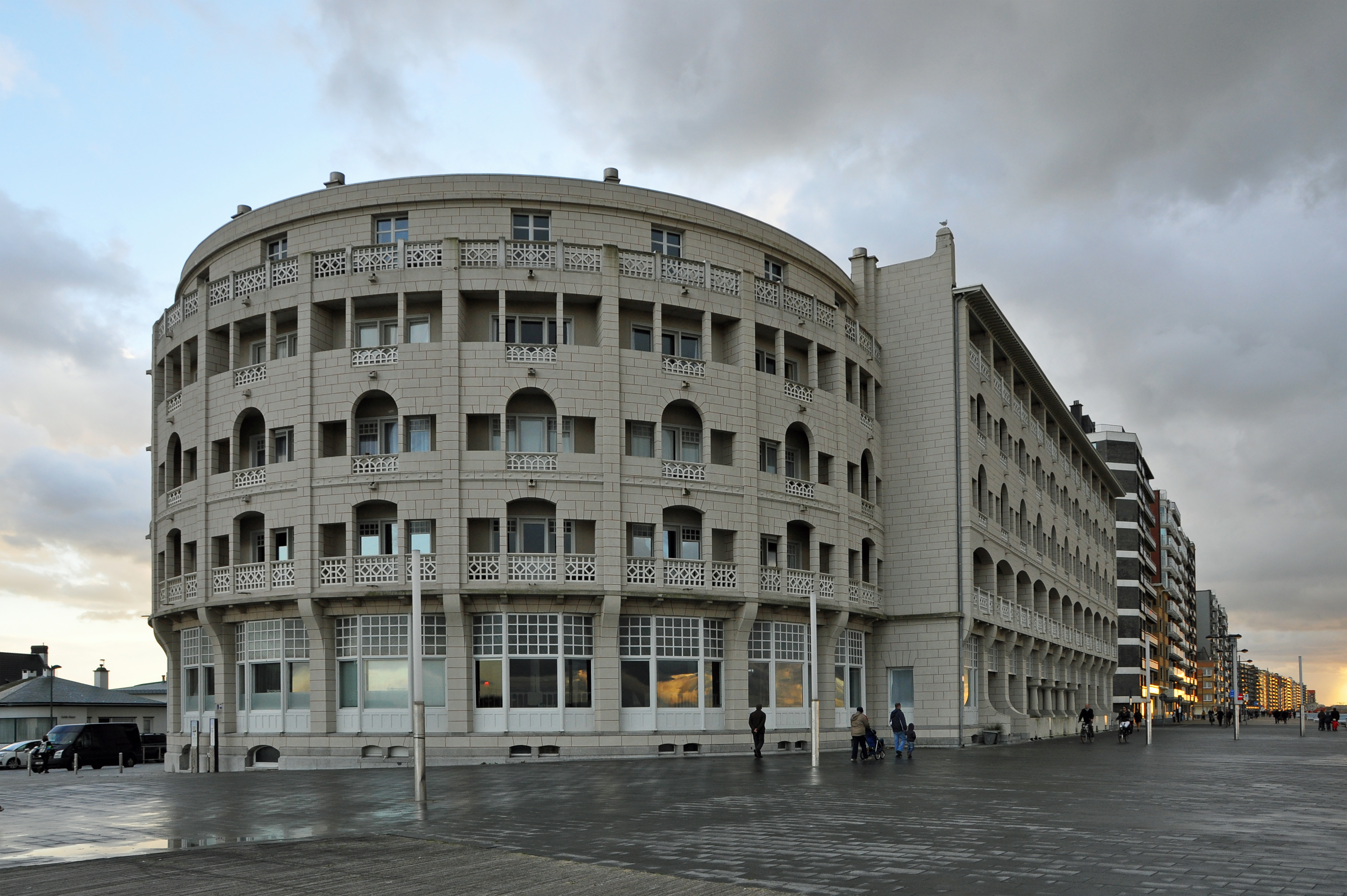
Grand Hôtel Bellevue in Westende

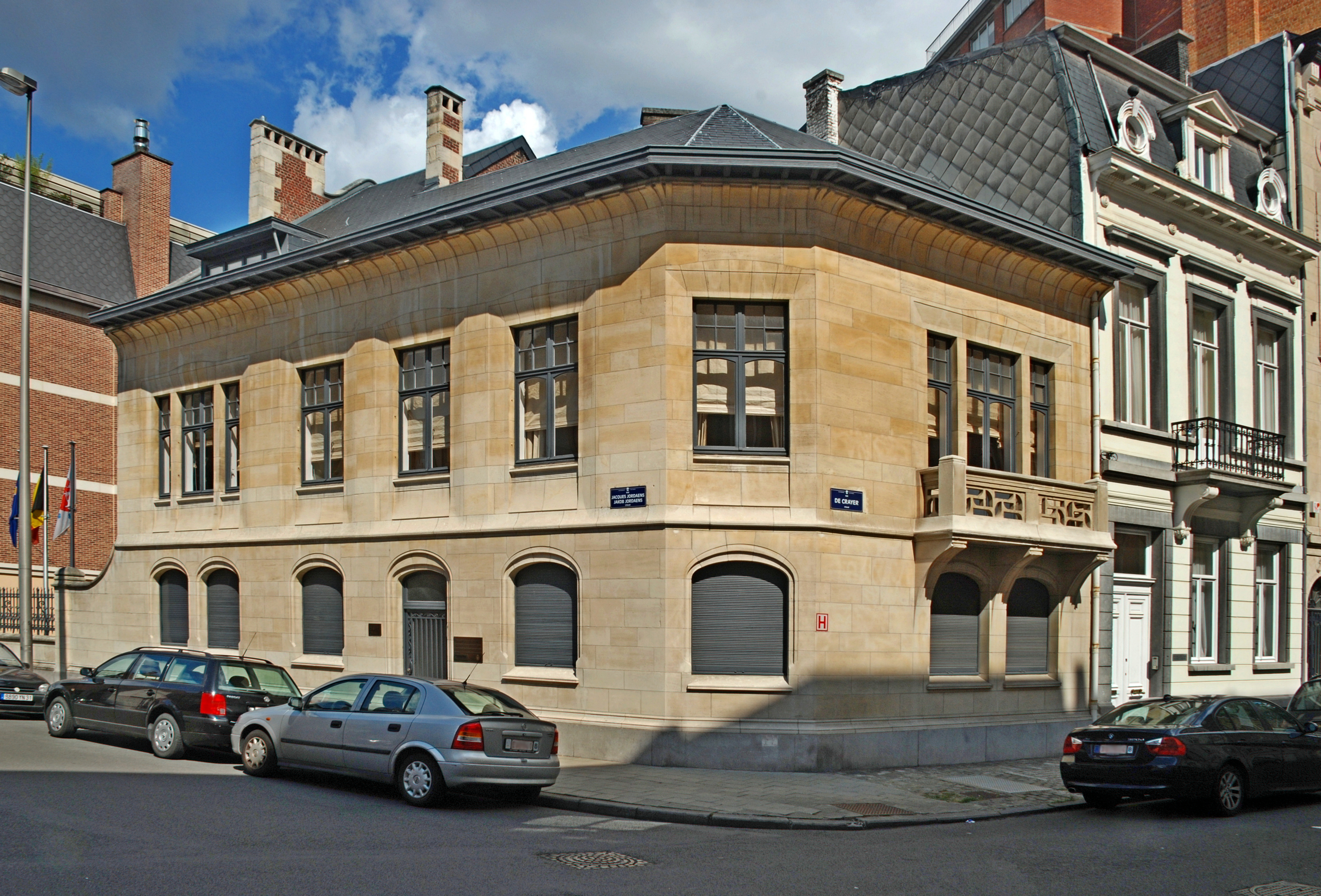
Hôtel de Brouckère in Brussels

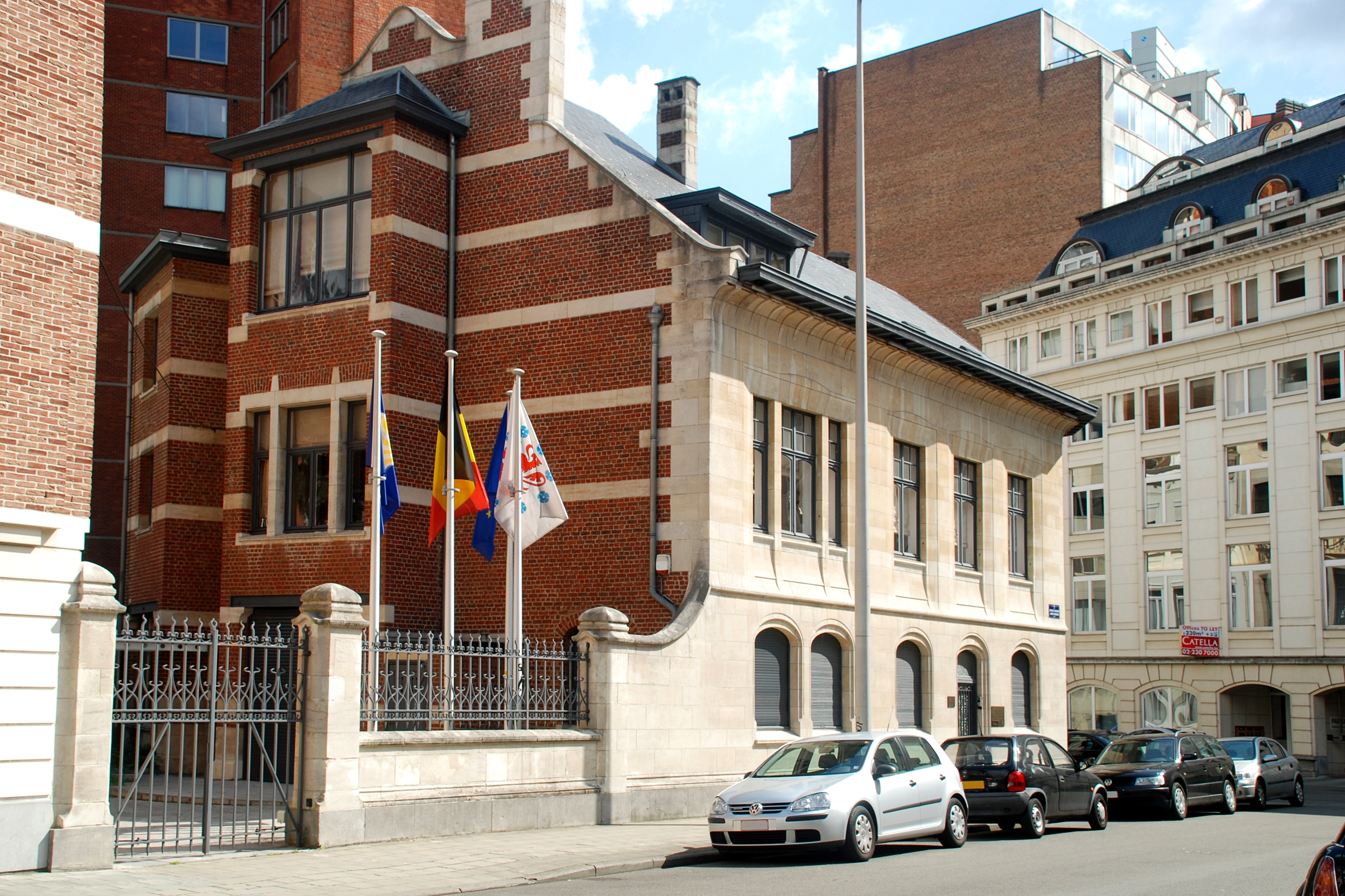
Polychrome side facade and courtyard of the Hôtel de Brouckère

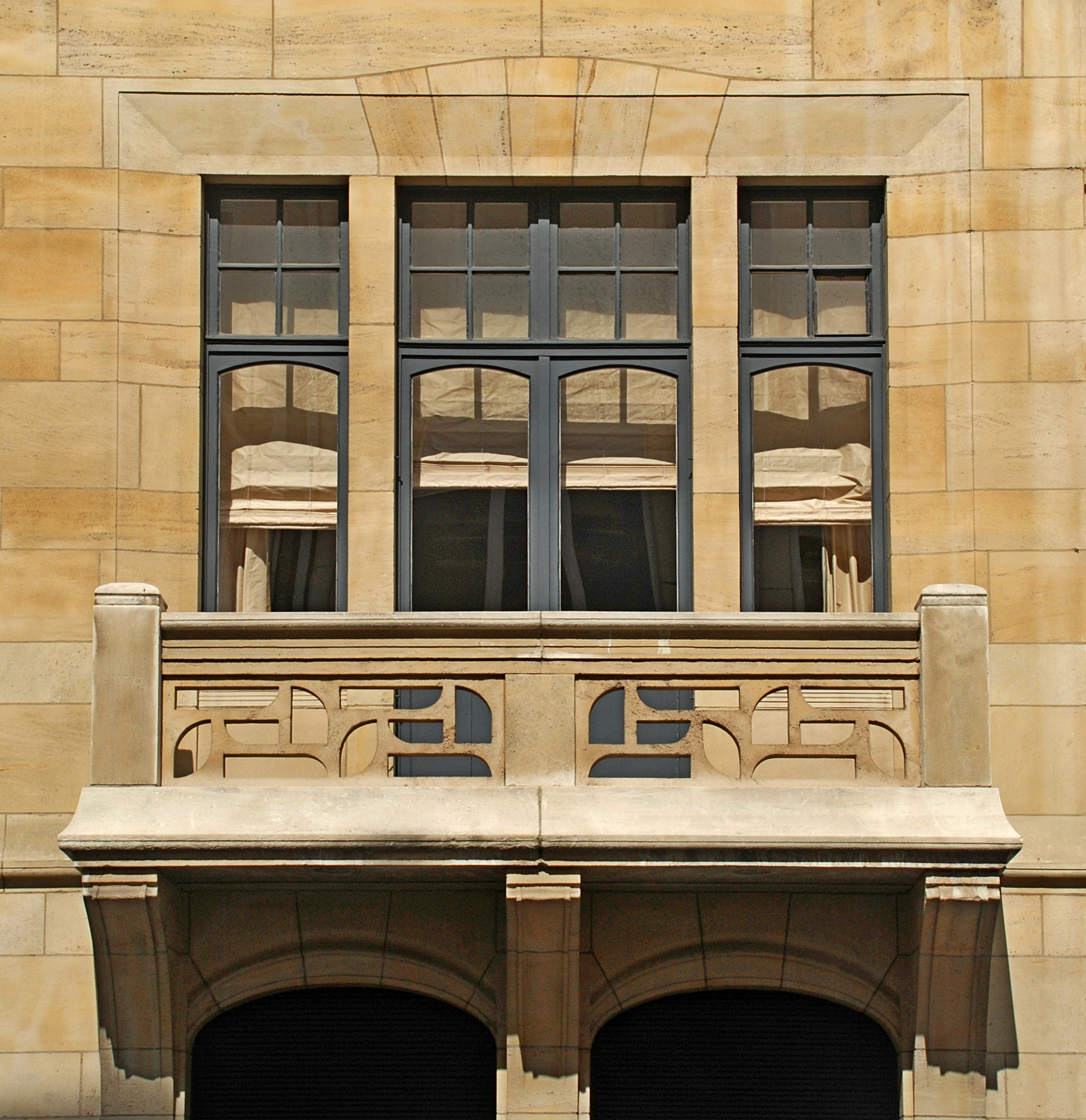
Balcony of the Hôtel de Brouckère

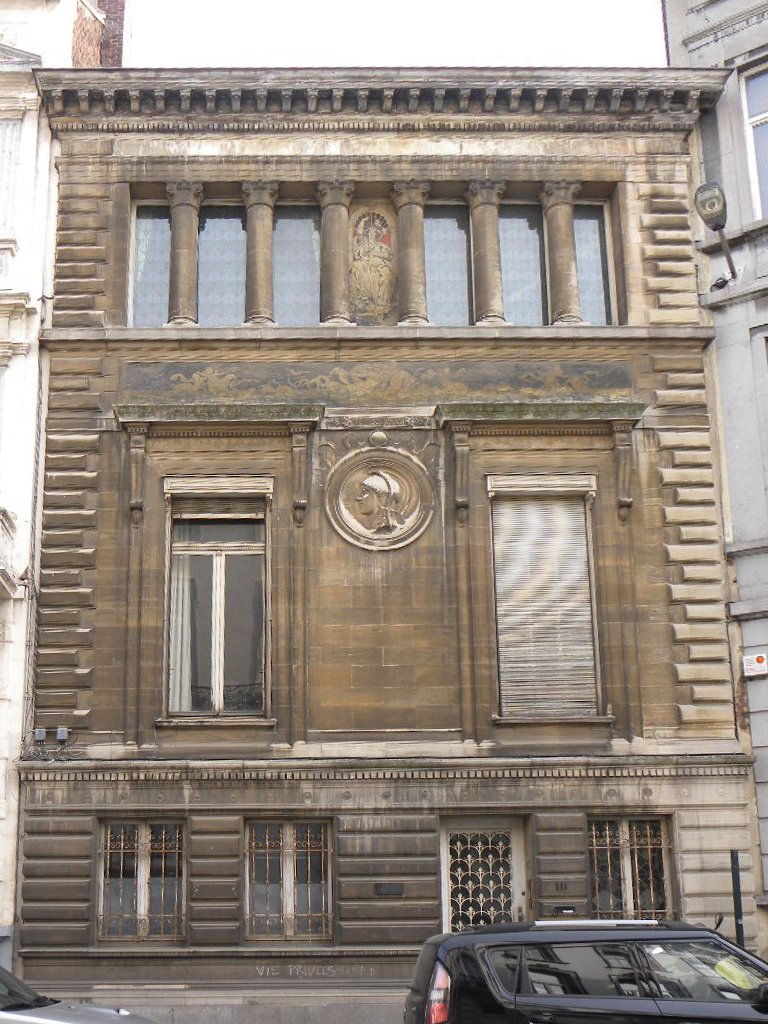
Hôtel Goblet d'Alviella in Saint-Gilles

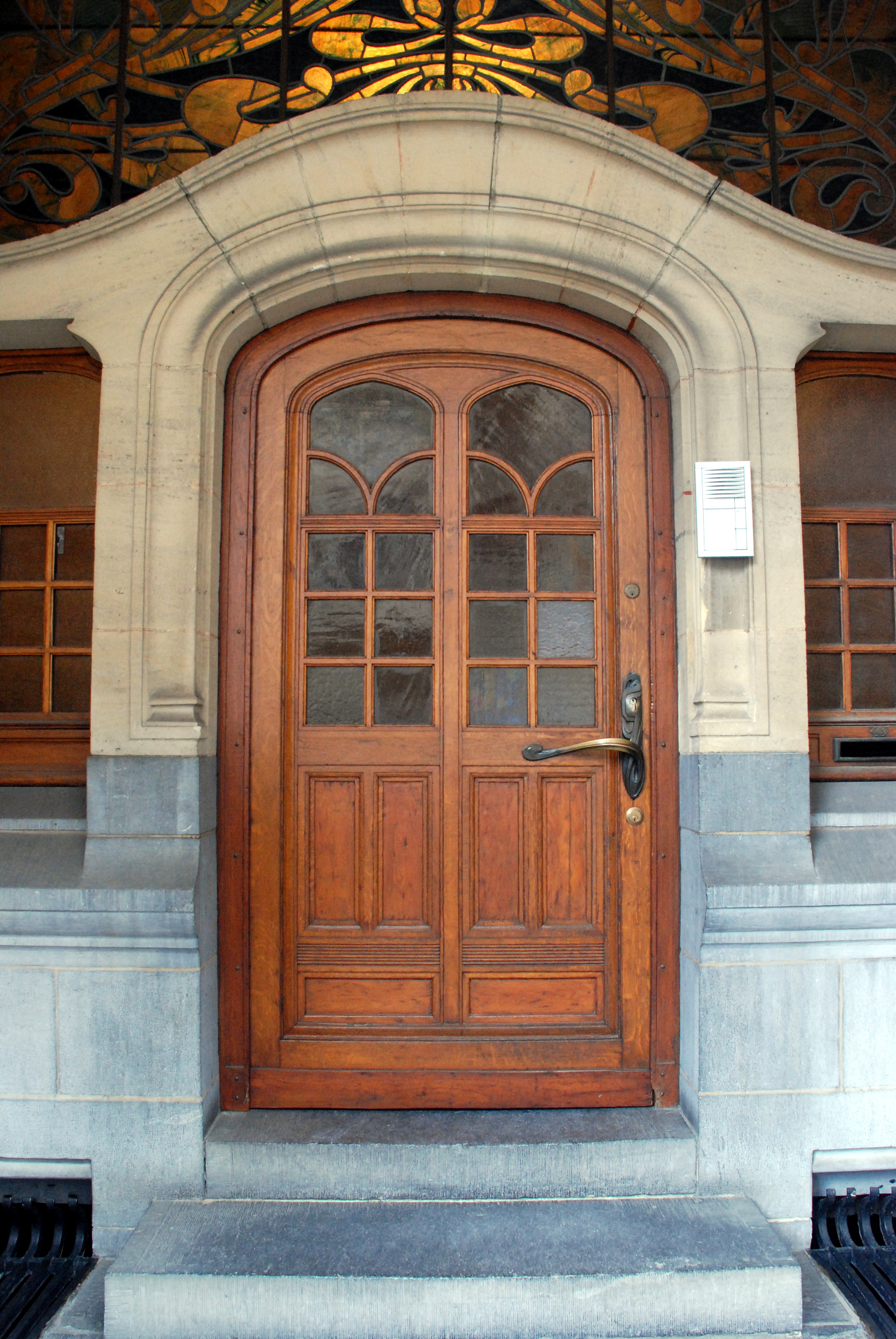
Entrance of the Hôtel Otlet

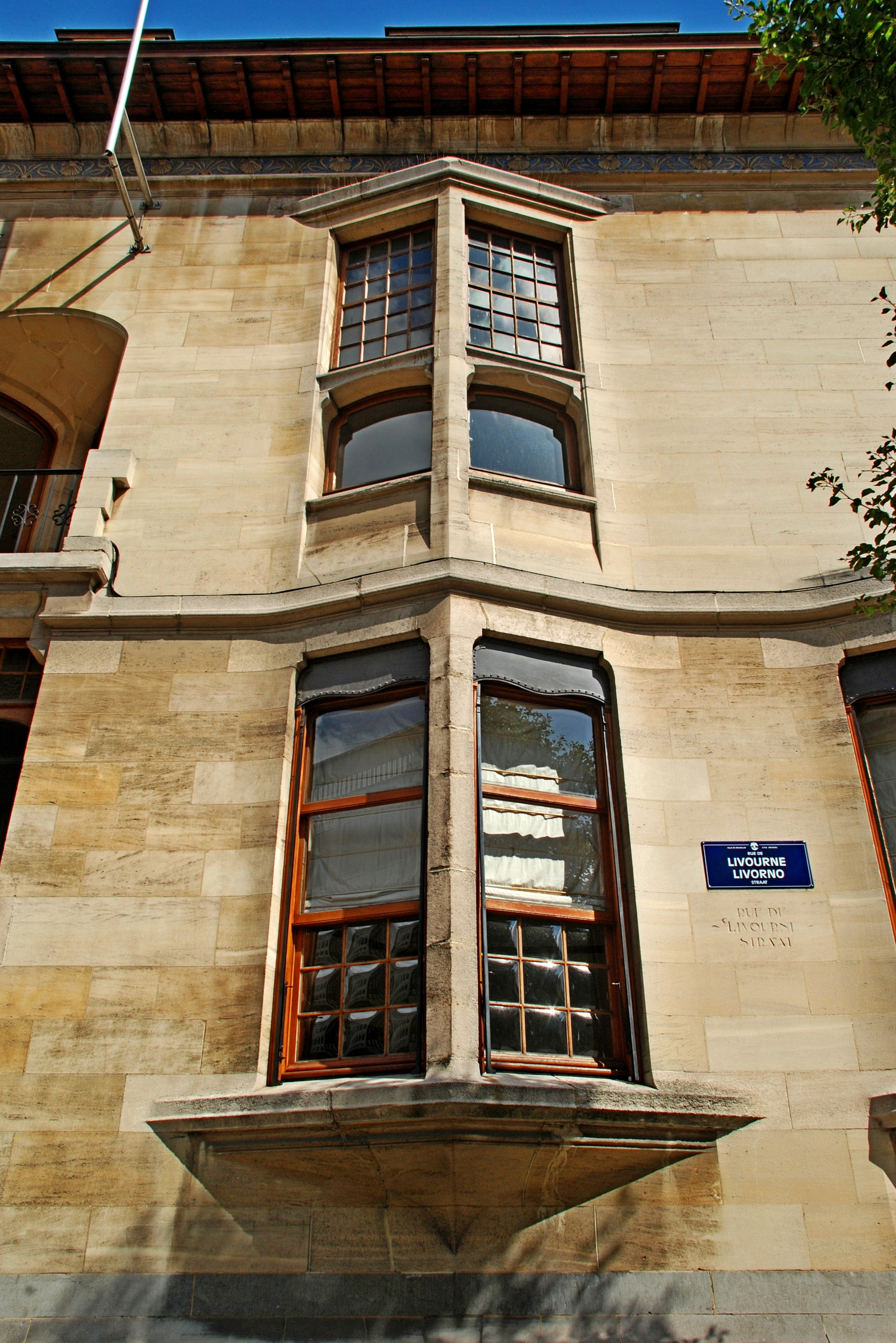
Facade of the Hôtel Otlet

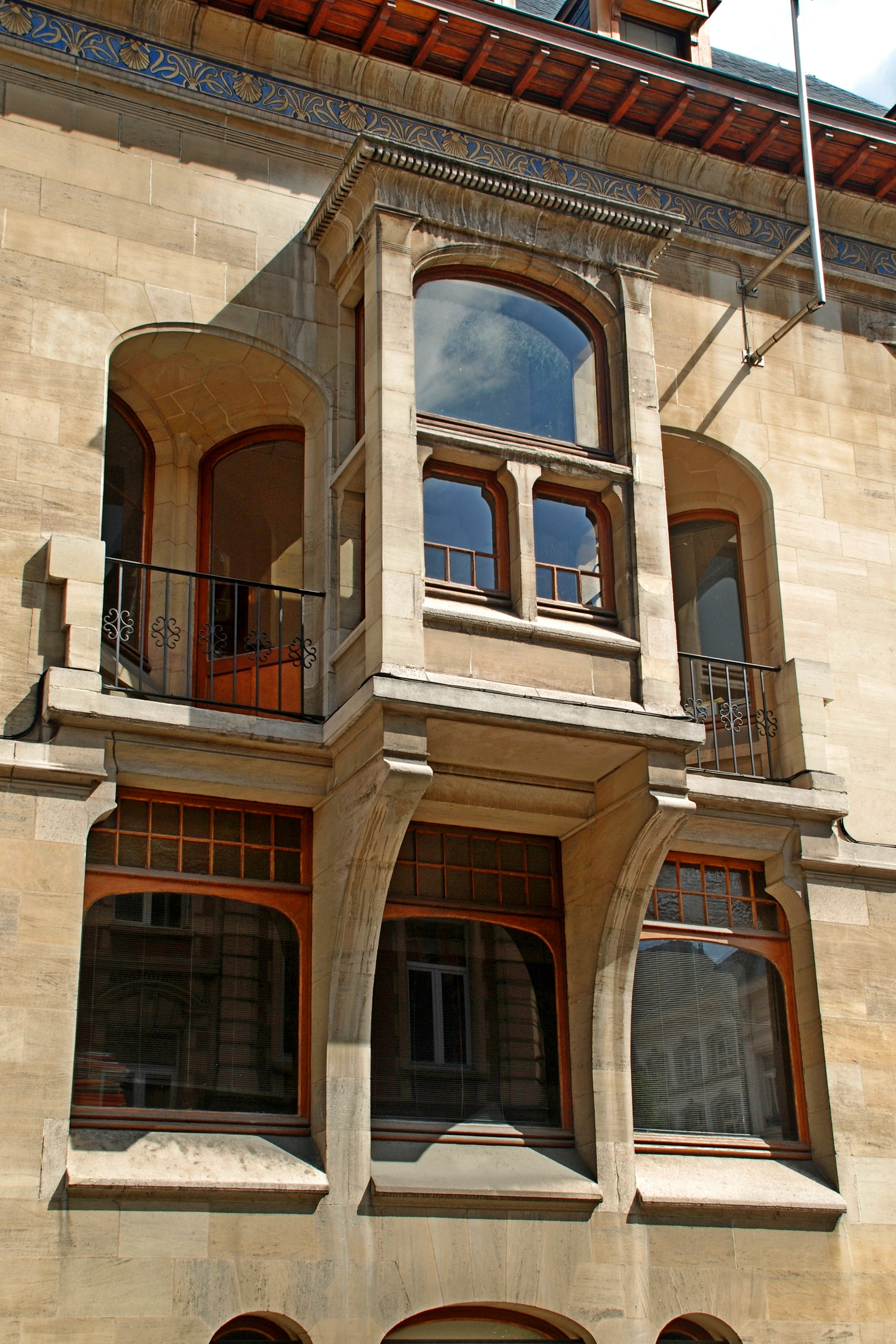
Hôtel Otlet, detail

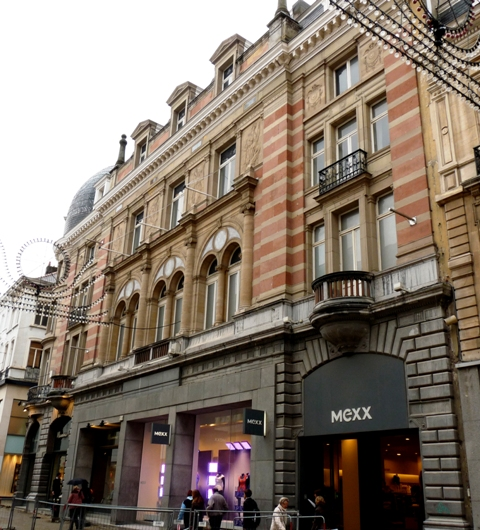
Winkelhuis in Ghent

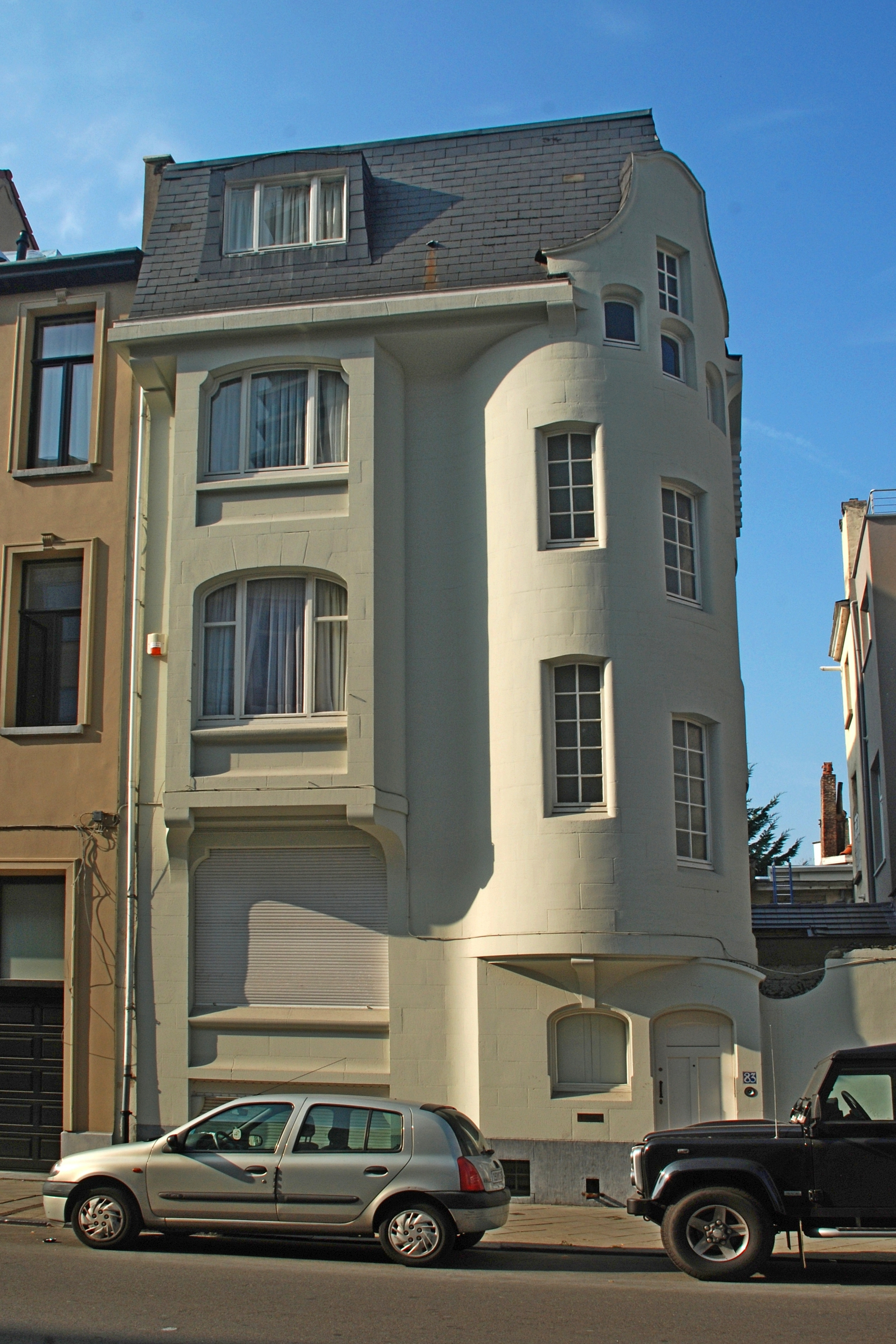
Van Rysselberghe House in Ixelles
