= Hôtel de Brouckère =

Historic Art Nouveau house in Brussels, Belgium

- Hôtel de Brouckère (French); Huis de Brouckère (Dutch)
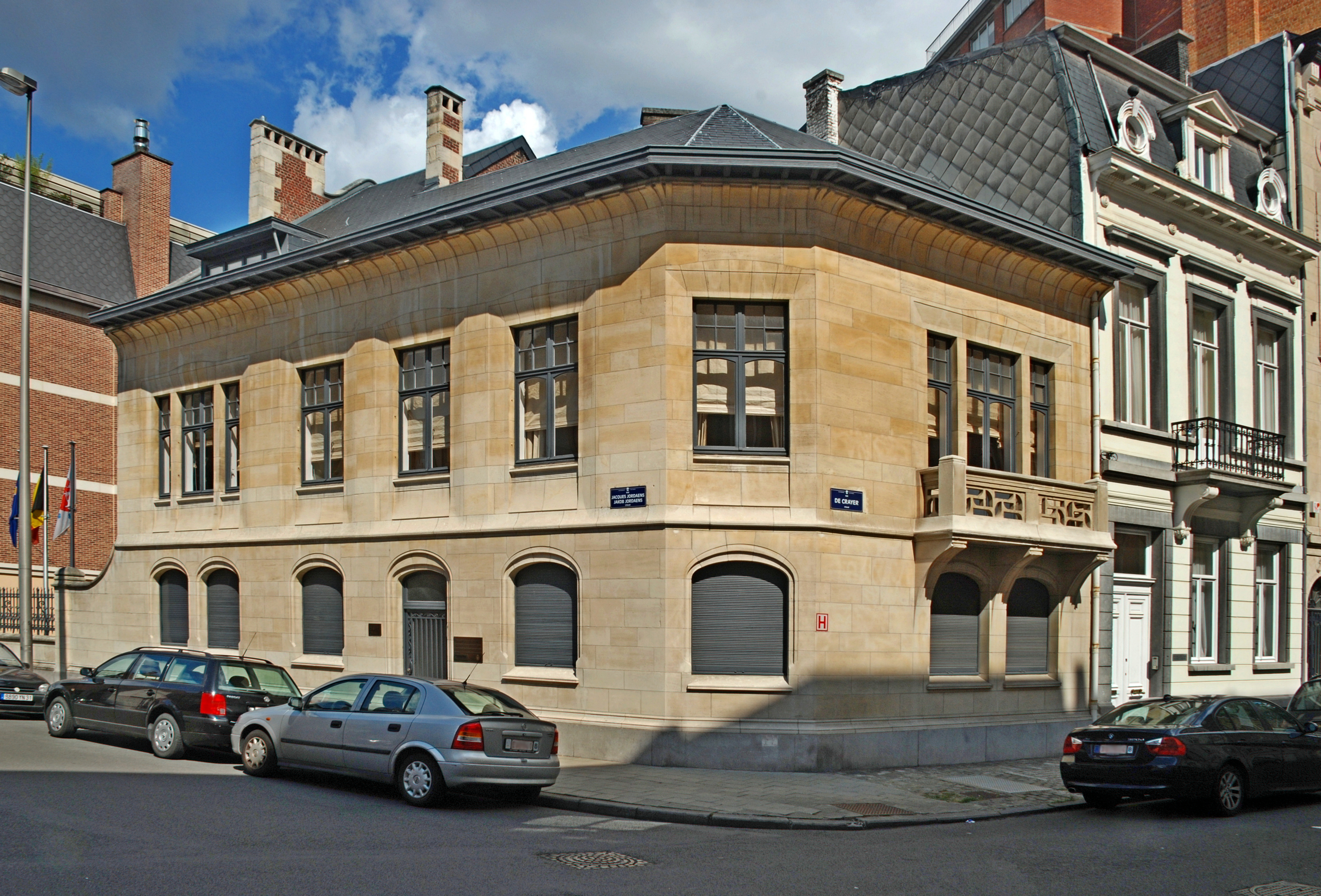
- Main façades of the Hôtel de Brouckère
- Interactive map of the Hôtel de Brouckère area

General information
- Type: Town house
- Architectural style: Art Nouveau
- Location: Rue Jacques Jordaens / Jacob Jordaensstraat 34, 1000 City of Brussels, Brussels-Capital Region, Belgium
- Coordinates: 50°49′15″N 4°22′8″E
- Completed: 1898
- Client: Florence de Brouckère
- Owner: Representation of the German-speaking Community

Design and construction
- Architect: Octave van Rysselberghe

The Hôtel de Brouckère (French: Hôtel de Brouckère; Dutch: Huis de Brouckère) is a historic town house in Brussels, Belgium. It was designed by the architect Octave van Rysselberghe, in collaboration with Henry van de Velde, for Florence de Brouckère, mother-in-law of Louis de Brouckère, and built in 1898, in Art Nouveau style.

The house is located at 34, rue Jacques Jordaens/Jacob Jordaensstraat, at the corner of the Rue De Crayer/De Crayerstraat, and a few steps from the Avenue Louise/Louizalaan.

== History ==
The Hôtel de Brouckère was built in 1898 for Florence de Brouckère, born Florence Tant, widow since 1887 of Gustave de Brouckère, mother-in-law of Louis de Brouckère, and friend of Élisée Reclus. It was in fact Élisée Reclus who was the true promoter of this construction and who put her companion in contact with Henry van de Velde and the creative world of the time.

The building was classified as a protected monument in 1997 and currently houses the Representation of the German-speaking Community.

== Architecture ==
=== Material ===
The Hôtel de Brouckère was built in freestone of golden colour, with the exception of the basement, which is made of blue stone.

=== Façades ===
The building is sober in style, and it does not have the same profusion of volumes as the nearby Hôtel Otlet. It has a short façade overlooking the Rue De Crayer and a long façade facing the Rue Jordaens, the two façades being connected by a canted side.

The bays on the ground floor are surmounted by low arches with an elegant design, while the first floor, underlined by a marked cordon, is pierced by a series of windows with a slightly recessed rectangular frame and surmounted by five keystones. The windows located at the ends of the floor are in triplet.

The façades are crowned by a cornice supported by an elegant freestone frieze punctuated by slender brackets also made of freestone.

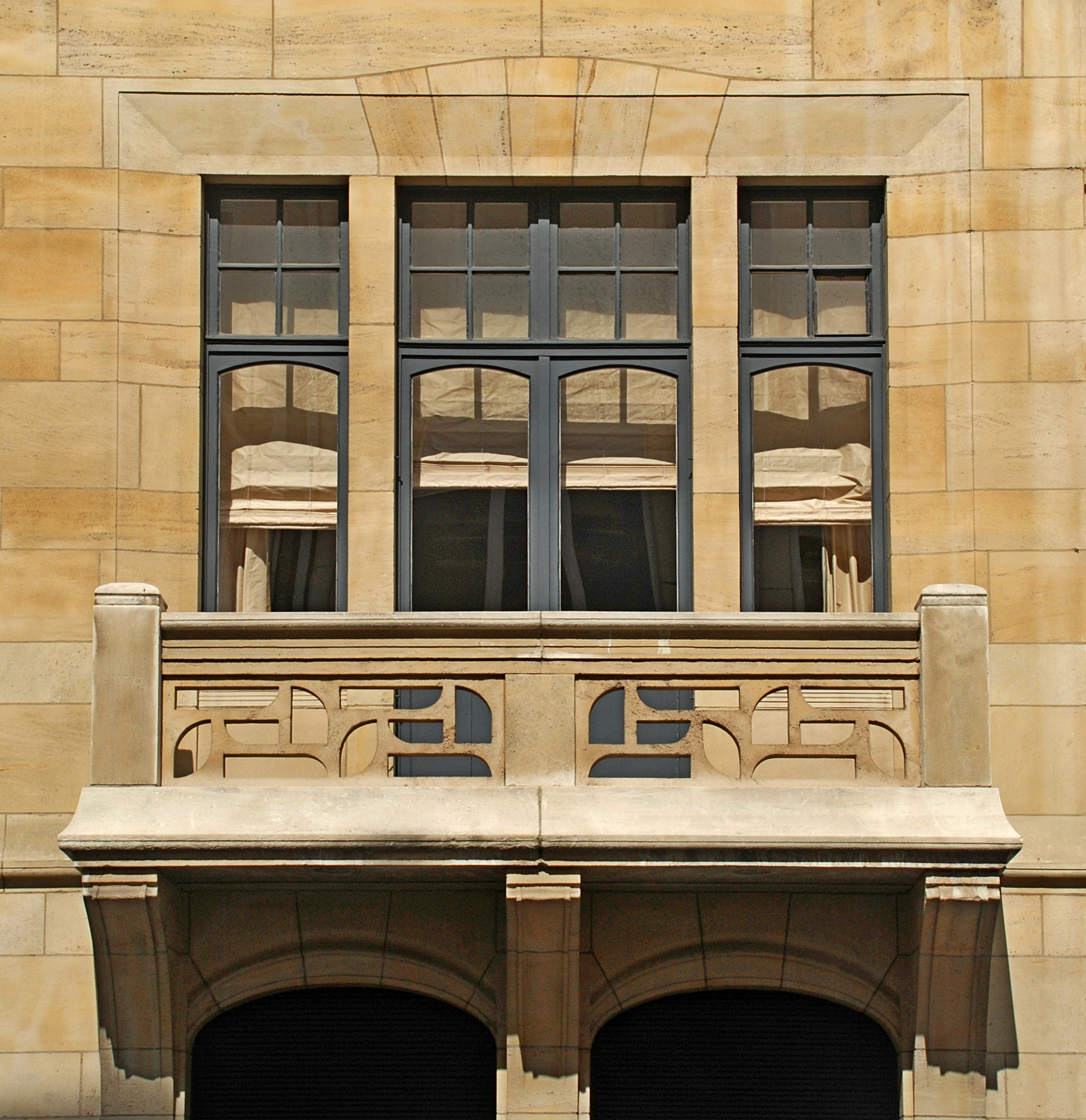
The balcony with the stone parapet

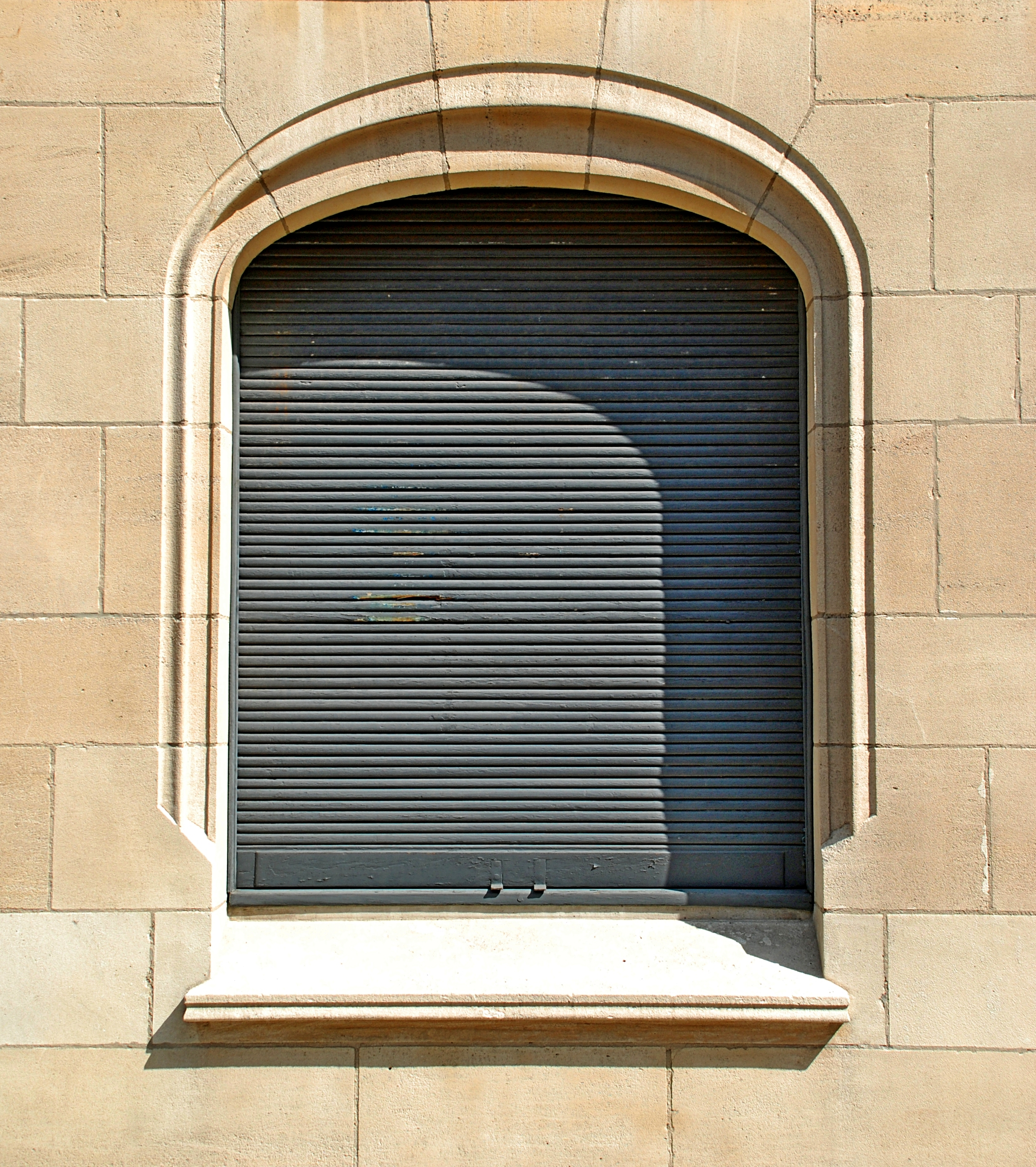
Low arch window

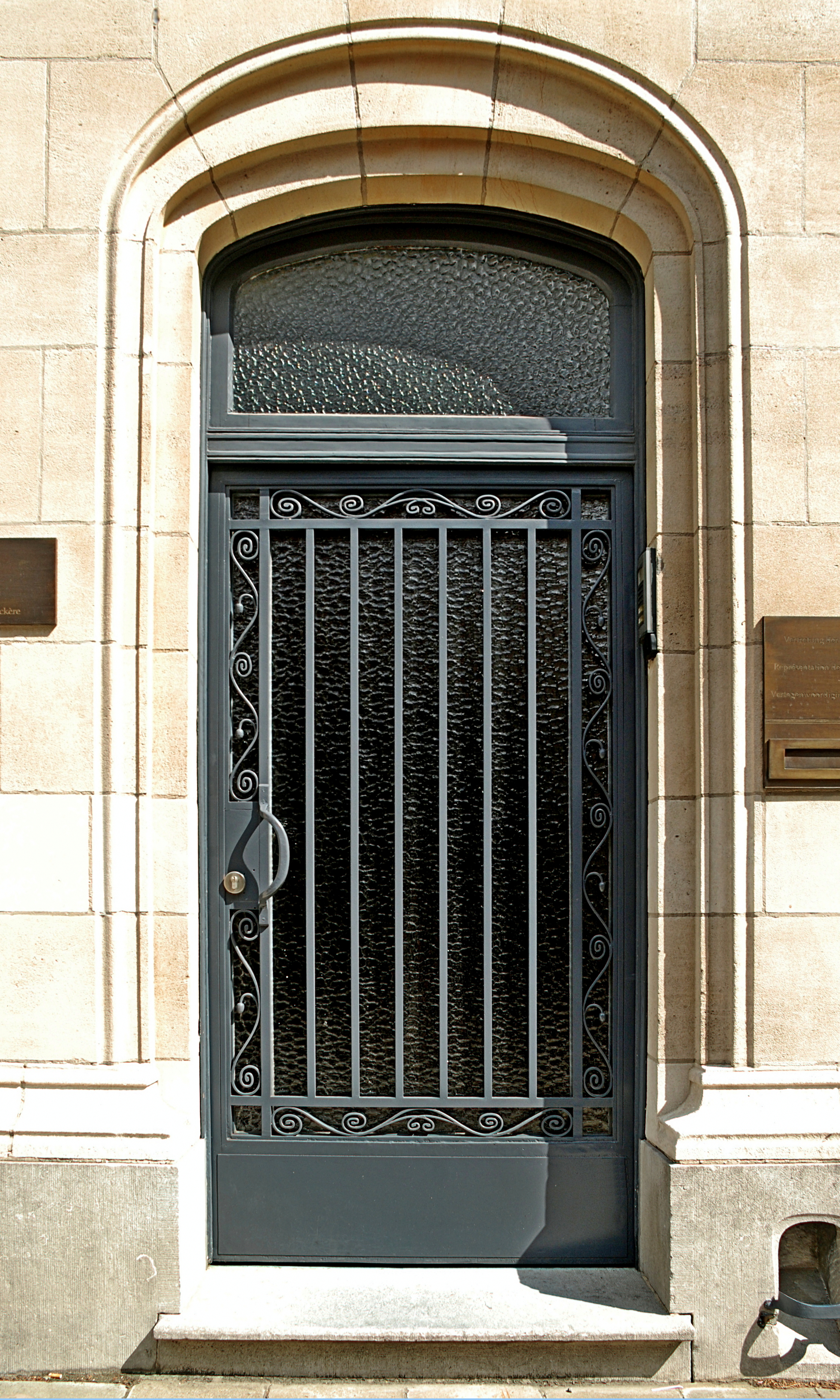
The door

=== Courtyard ===
The building is extended by a courtyard delimited by an enclosure wall clinging to the main façade with an elegant curve.

The side façade overlooking this courtyard presents an alternation of white stone and red brick.

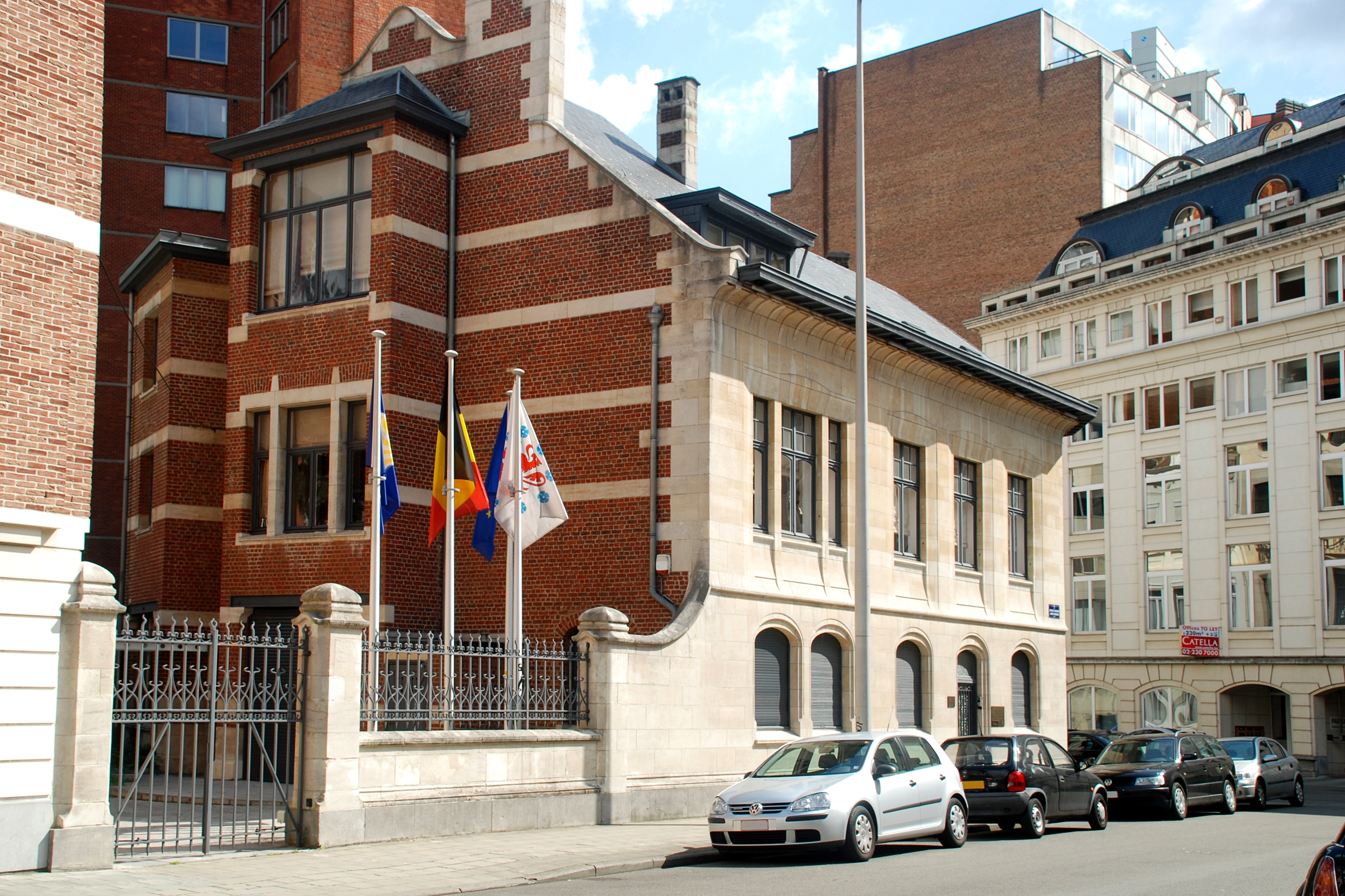
The enclosure wall of the courtyard and the polychrome side façade

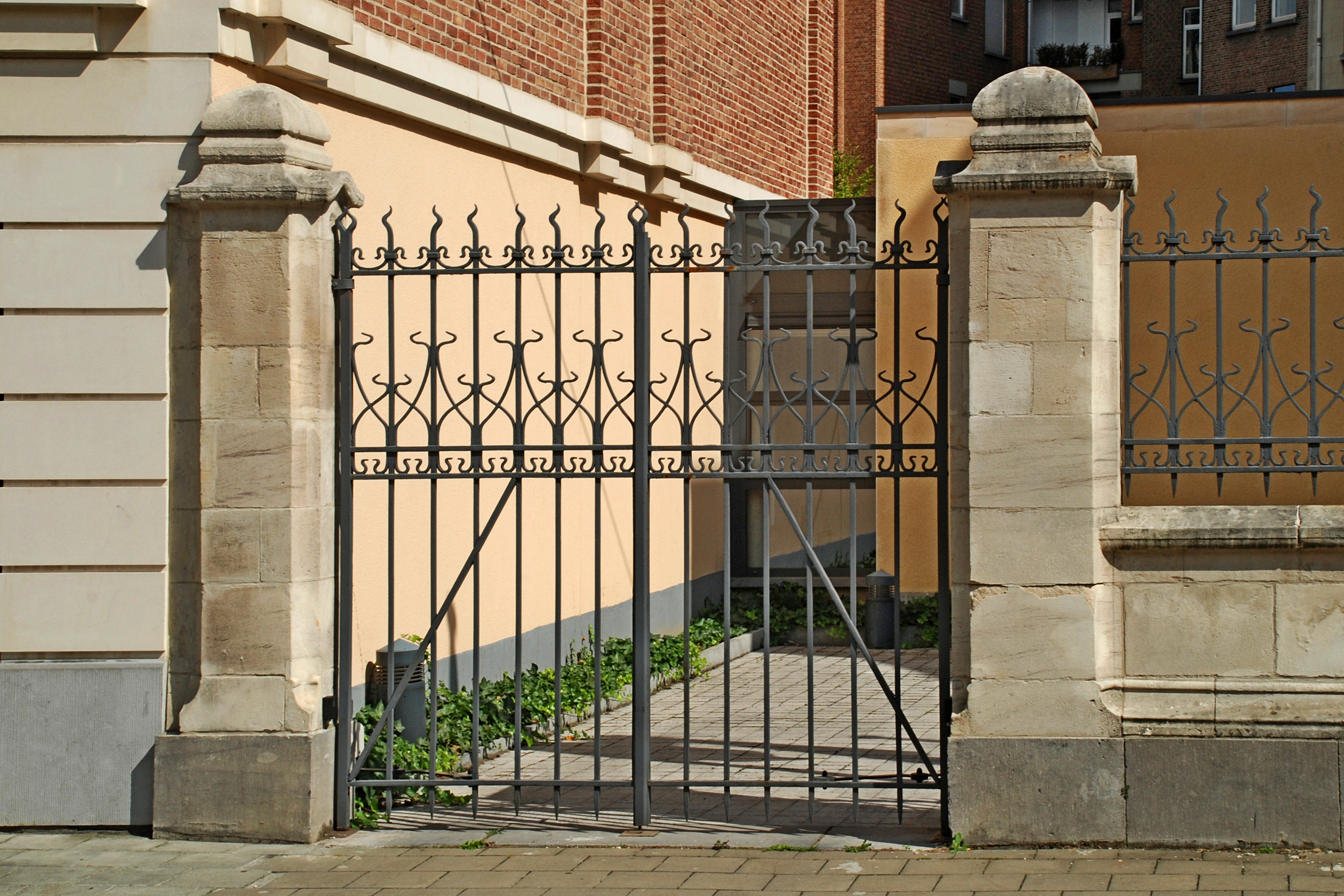
The courtyard gate

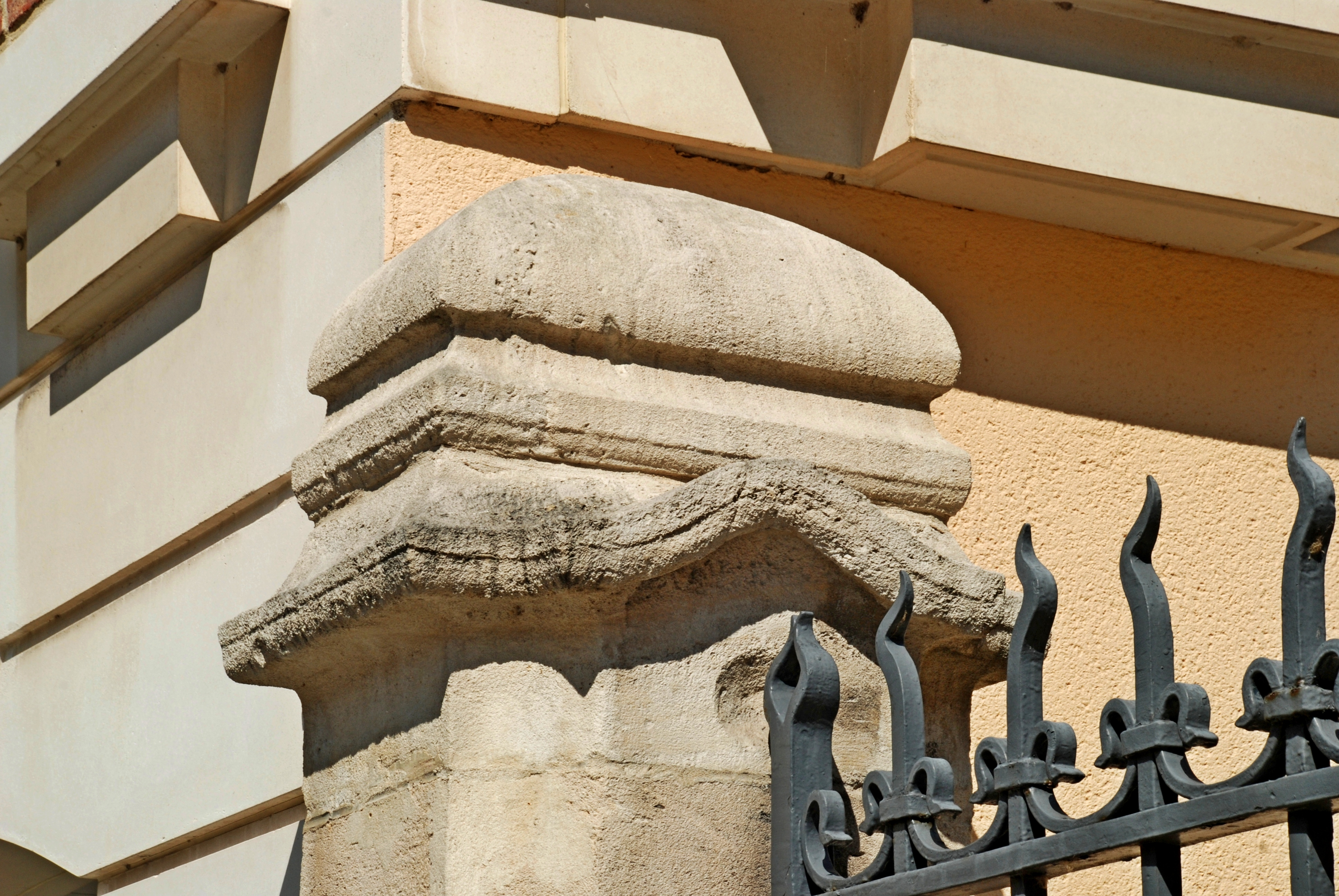
Pillar crowning

== See also ==
- Art Nouveau in Brussels
- History of Brussels
- Culture of Belgium
- Belgium in the long nineteenth century
