= Bellecourt =

Bellecourt is a surname, and may refer to:

- Clyde Bellecourt (1936–2022), Native American rights activist
- George-Antoine Bellecourt (1803–1874), Canadian priest and missionary
- Gustave Duchesne de Bellecourt (1817–1881), 19th century French diplomat who was active in Asia
- Sylvie Bouchet Bellecourt (born 1957), French politician
- Vernon Bellecourt (1931–2007), Native American rights activist

== See also ==
- Bellecour (actor), French actor
- Belle Court Apartments, Oregon, United States
- Belcourt of Newport, Rhode Island, United States
- Bell Court, Lexington, Kentucky, United States
- Bellicourt, France
- Bellecourt, Wallonia, a district of the municipality of Manage, Belgium
