= Hôtel Goblet d'Alviella =

Hôtel particulier in Brussels, Belgium

- Hôtel Goblet d'Alviella (French); Huis Goblet d'Alviella (Dutch)
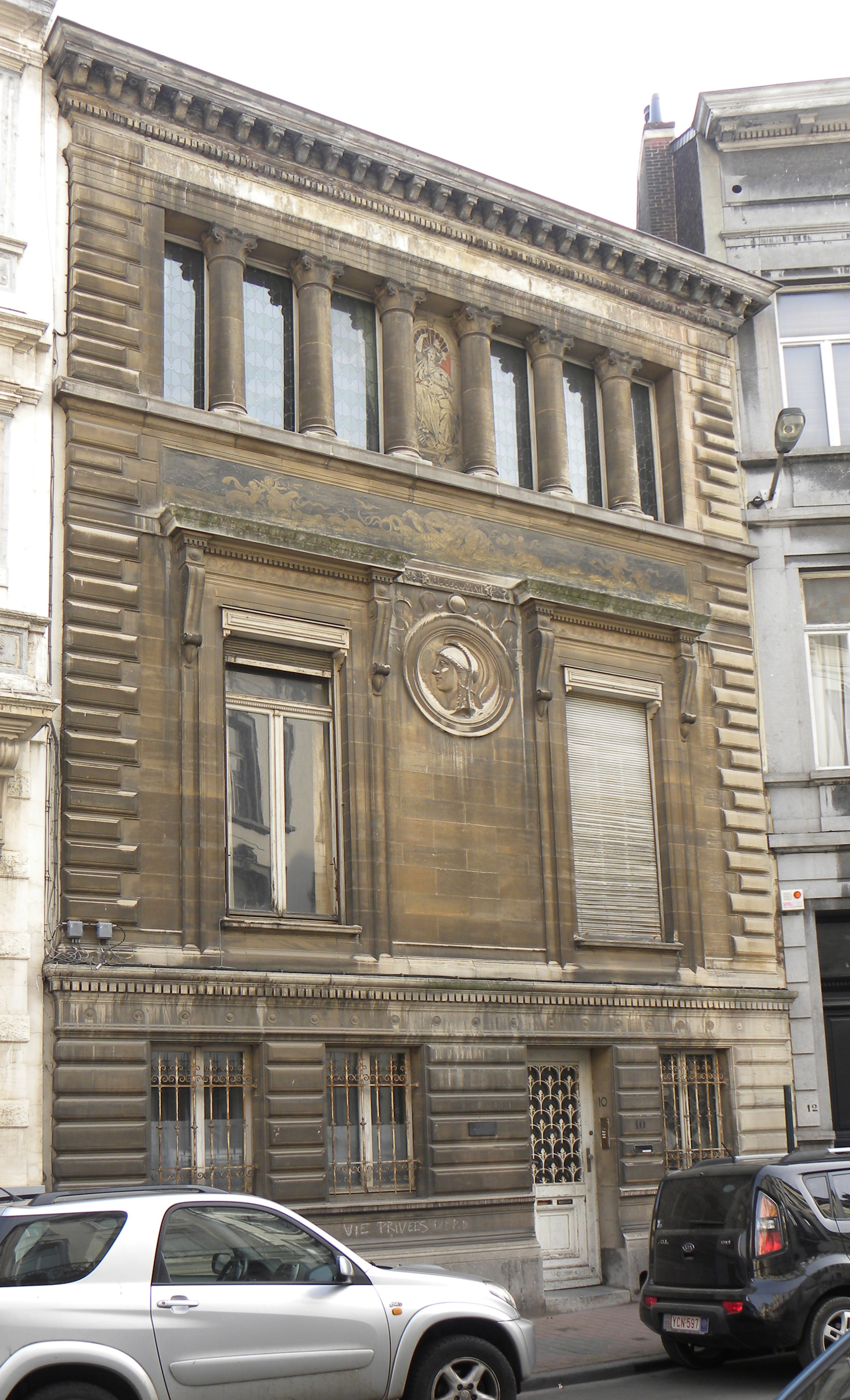
- Hôtel Goblet d'Alviella on the Rue Faider/Faiderstraat in Brussels
- Interactive map of the Hôtel Goblet d'Alviella area

General information
- Architectural style: Art Nouveau; Renaissance
- Location: Saint-Gilles, Brussels-Capital Region, Belgium
- Coordinates: 50°49′44″N 4°21′24″E
- Completed: 1882
- Client: Count Goblet d'Alviella

Design and construction
- Architect: Octave van Rysselberghe

The Hôtel Goblet d'Alviella (French: Hôtel Goblet d'Alviella; Dutch: Huis Goblet d'Alviella) is a hôtel particulier designed by Octave van Rysselberghe on the Rue Faider/Faiderstraat in Saint-Gilles, a municipality of Brussels, Belgium. It is the first major realisation by Van Rysselberghe, who lived there until 1888. After that, the client, Count Eugène Goblet d'Alviella, professor, liberal member of parliament and freemason, moved in.

== History ==
The building, with a strong Renaissance influence, was built in 1882 and is decorated with four sgraffiti. It was the first time these were applied on a large scale in Brussels. They were drawn by the sculptor Julien Dillens and executed by the architect Jean Baes. Under the entablature of the two large windows, each has a narrow acanthus motif. Above it, a water-themed frieze depicts Triton and a siren surrounded by dolphins and putti. Between the columns is an allegory of architecture (plumb in hand and foot resting on a piece of Ionic column). The medallion between the windows is by Dillens and represents Minerva. The Greek text τεχνων εραστρια means 'she who loves art'. Under the cornice is a Venetian loggia. Between the columns are six blue tinted stained glass windows with geometric motifs.

The building is currently occupied by a private school.

== Gallery ==
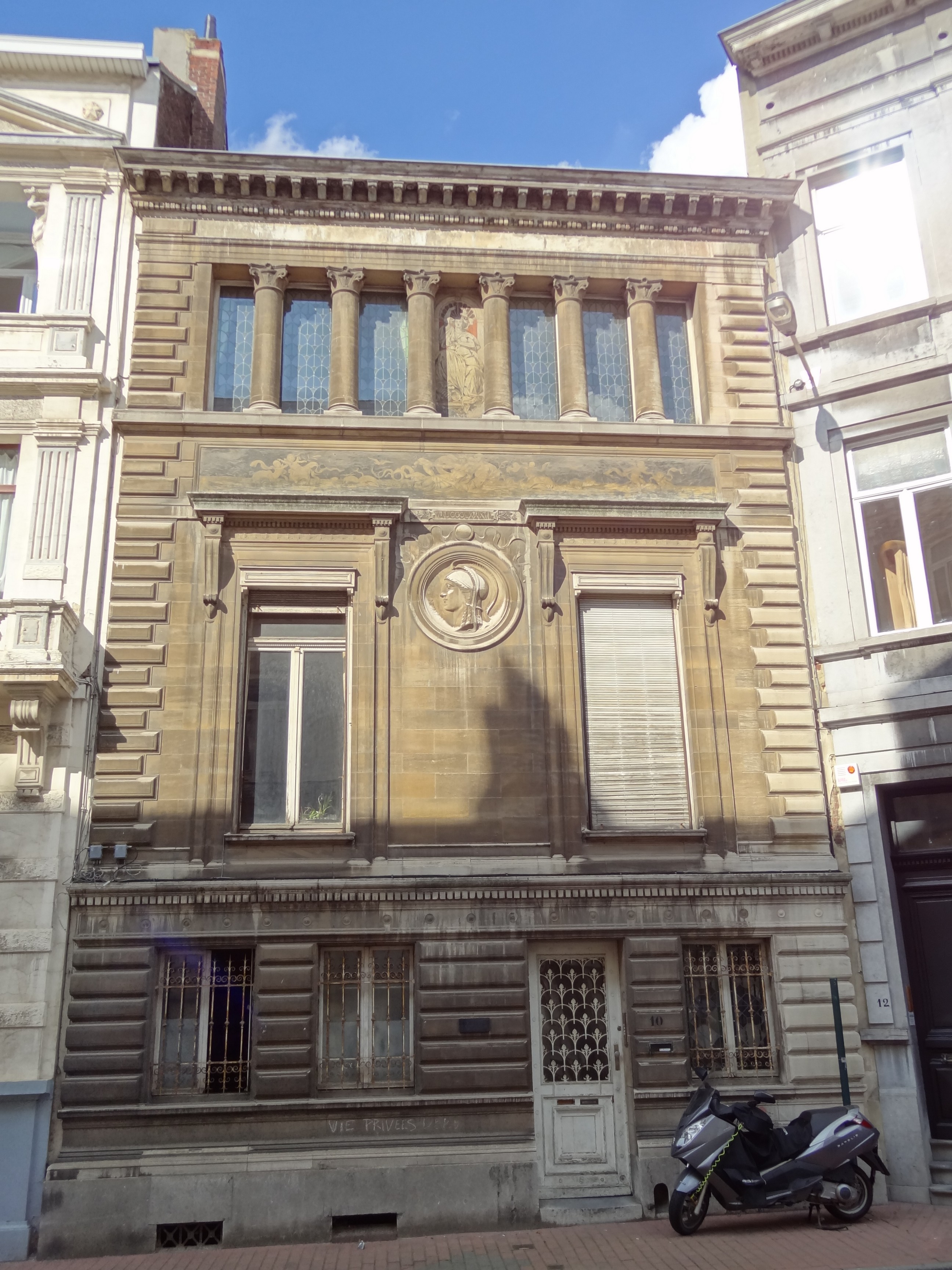
Façade
