= Castelré =

- Village
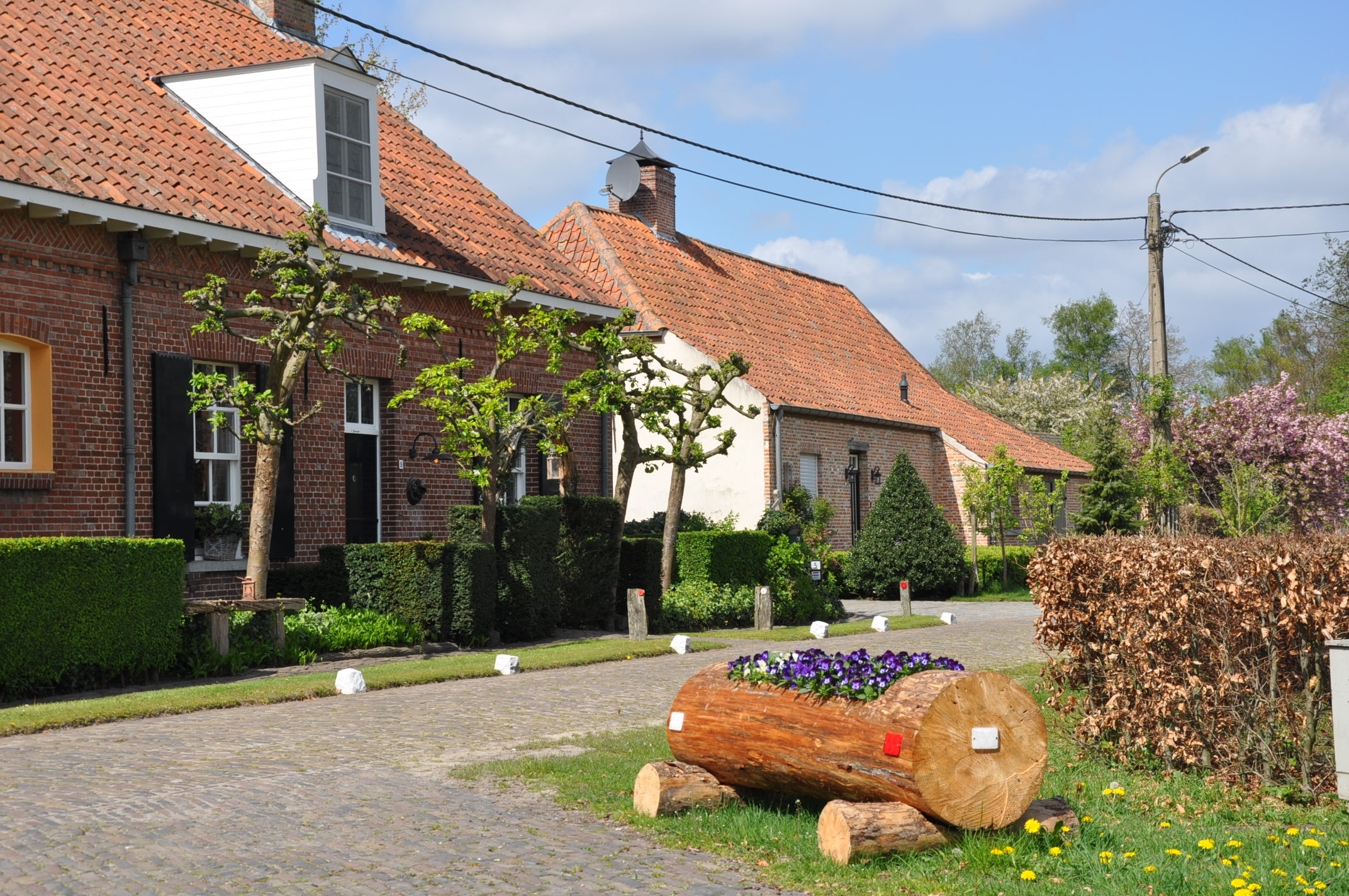
- Farms in Castelré

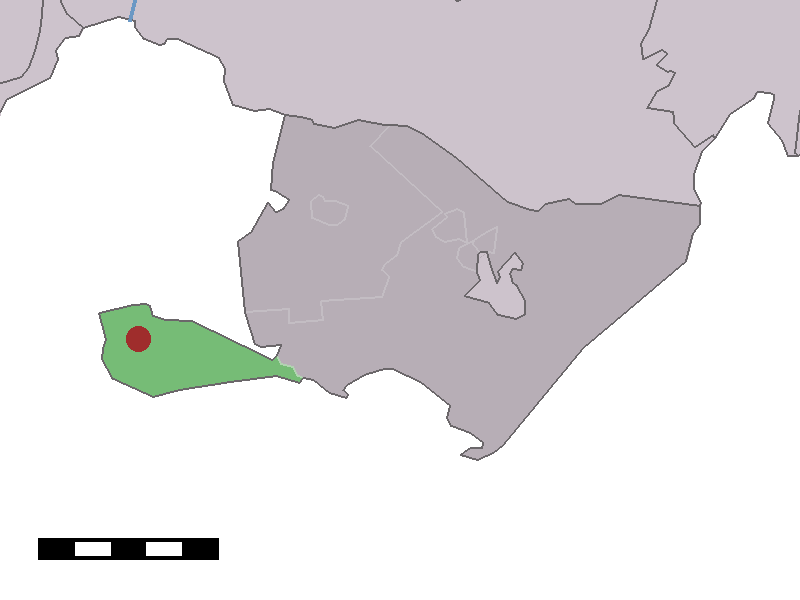
- Location within Baarle-Nassau municipality of Castelré village (red dot) and statistical district (light green area)

- Location in the province of North Brabant in the Netherlands Castelré (Netherlands)
- Coordinates: 51°25′31″N 04°46′50″E
- Country: Netherlands
- Province: North Brabant
- Municipality: Baarle-Nassau

Area
  - Total: 6.67 km^{2} (2.58 sq mi)
- Elevation: 16 m (52 ft)

Population (2021)
  - Total: 120
  - Density: 18/km^{2} (47/sq mi)
- Time zone: UTC+1 (CET)
  - Summer (DST): UTC+2 (CEST)
- Postal code: 5114
- Dialing code: 013
- Website: Gemeentesite

Castelré (Dutch pronunciation: [ˌkɑstəlˈreː]) is a village in the Dutch province of North Brabant. It is a part of the municipality of Baarle-Nassau, and lies some 20 km south of Breda.

In 2000 a millennium chapel was built at the "Kempische-driehoek" 't Groesje.

Castelré belongs to the parish of Sint-Clemenskerk, Minderhout. As Minderhout is a Belgian village in the community of Hoogstraten only a few hundred metres to the west, people are more oriented to Minderhout than to their official municipality of Baarle-Nassau, over 10 km to the east.

== History ==
The village was first mentioned in 1231 as "de molendino de Casterle". The etymology is unclear.

Castelré was home to 305 people in 1840. In 1970, a monument was unveiled for the first air balloon to land in the Netherlands. The balloon was launched in 1870 in Paris, and supposed to land in France. In 1978, the village was entered in the postal database as Castelre without an accent. As of 2022, it has not been corrected.

== Gallery ==
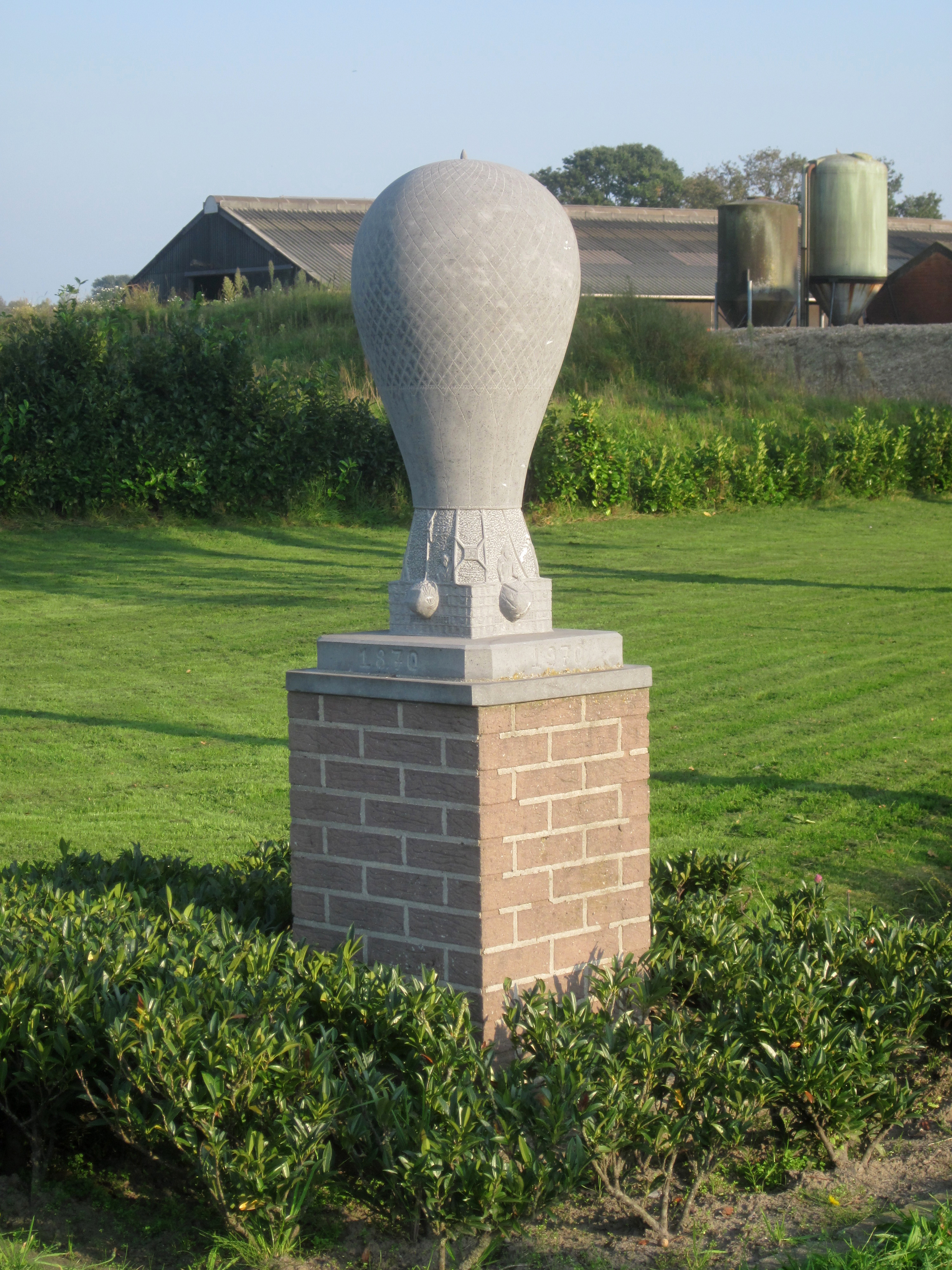
Monument to the air balloon landing

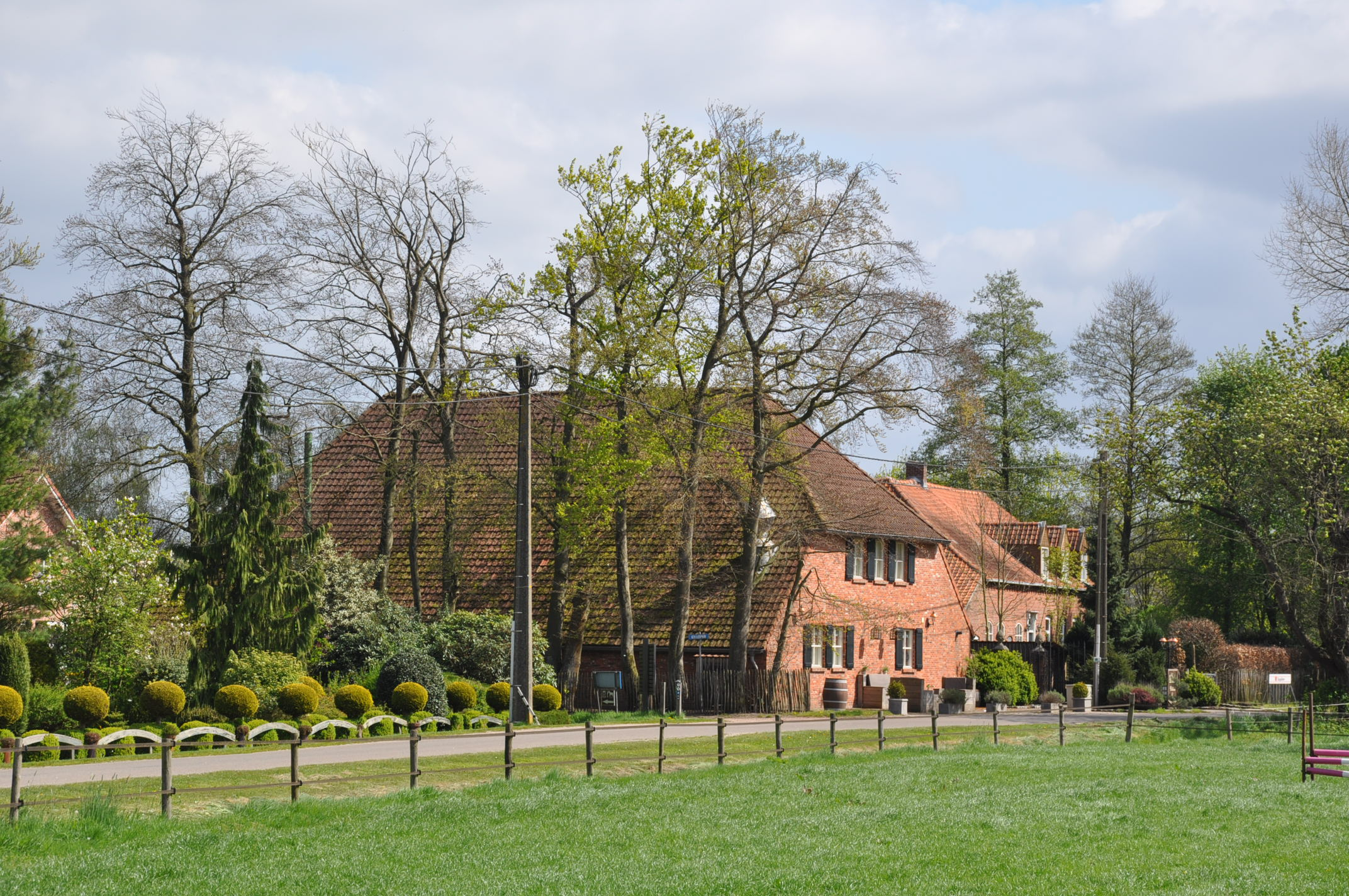
Farm in Castelré

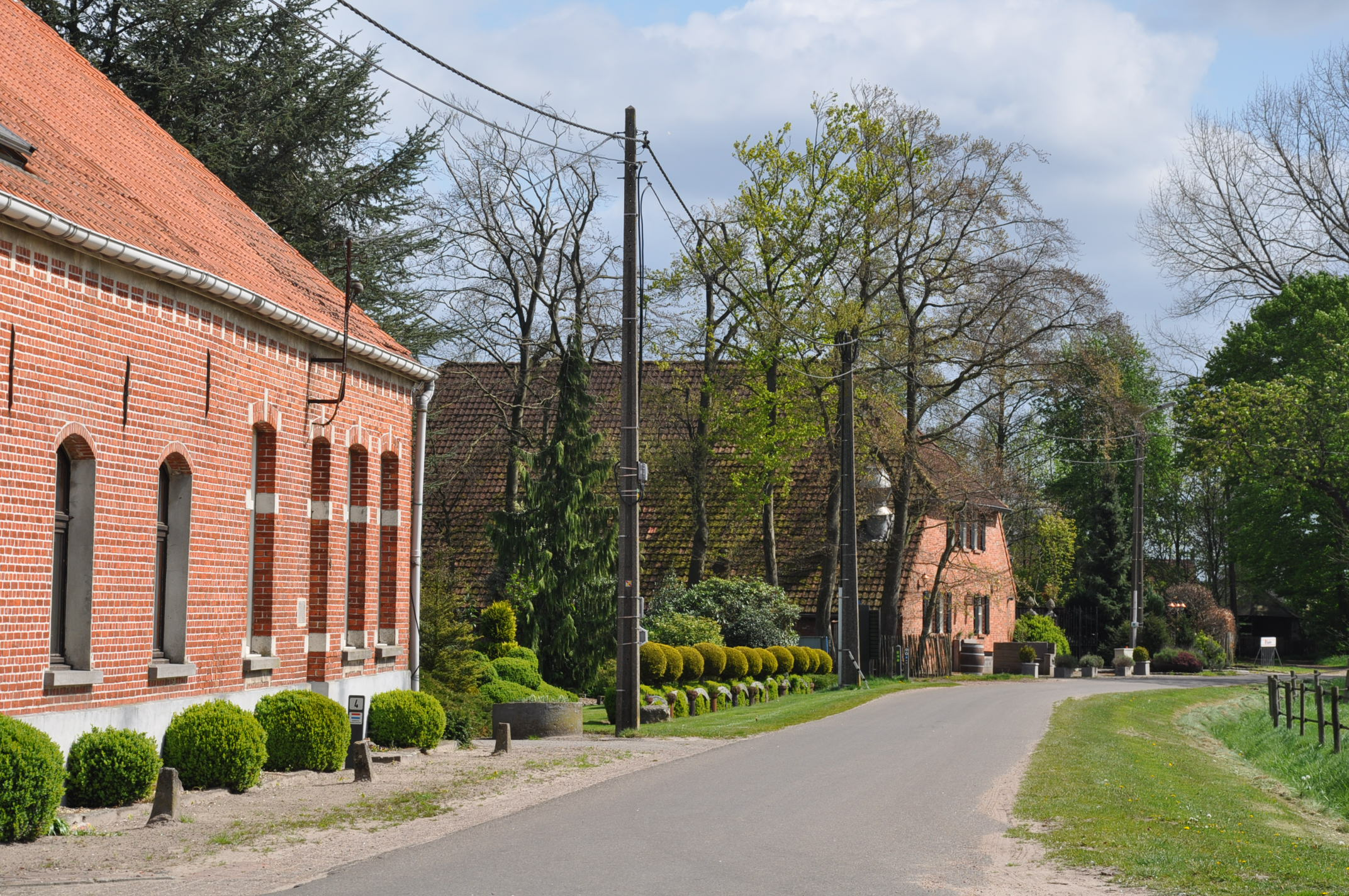
Street view
