= Van Rysselberghe House =

Historic Art Nouveau house in Brussels, Belgium

- Maison Van Rysselberghe (French); Huis Van Rysselberghe (Dutch)
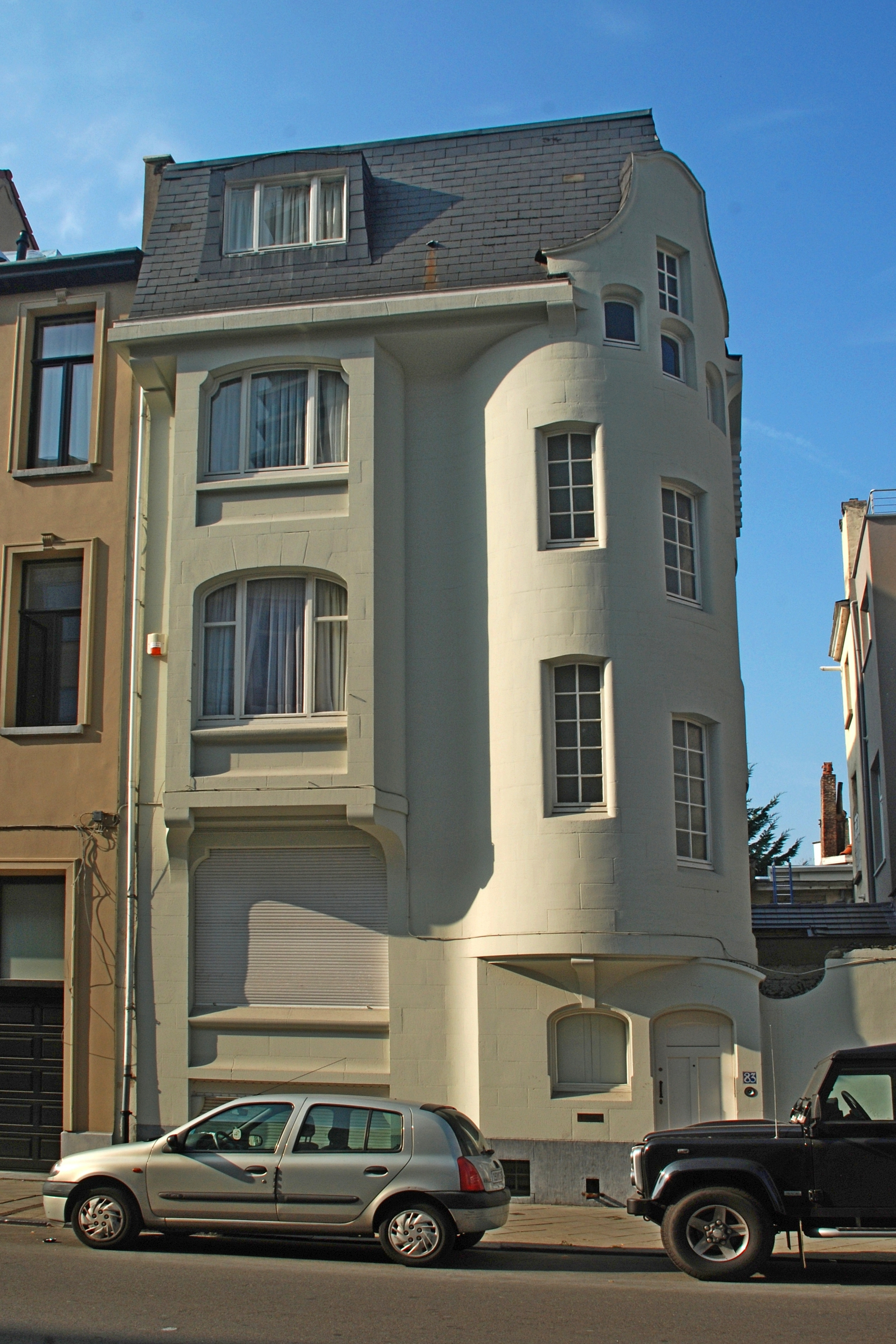
- Main façade of the Van Rysselberghe House

General information
- Type: Town house
- Architectural style: Eclecticism, Art Nouveau
- Location: Rue de Livourne / Livornostraat 83, 1050 Ixelles, Brussels-Capital Region, Belgium
- Coordinates: 50°49′41″N 4°21′39″E
- Completed: 1912

Design and construction
- Architect: Octave van Rysselberghe

The Van Rysselberghe House (French: Maison Van Rysselberghe; Dutch: Huis Van Rysselberghe or Van Rysselberghehuis) is a town house built by Octave van Rysselberghe in Ixelles, Brussels, Belgium. It was the personal house of Octave van Rysselberghe and is located at 83, rue de Livourne/Livornostraat, a few steps from the Hôtel Otlet erected by the same architect.

The building, semi-detached, has a narrow façade that revolves around a protruding staircase in the form of tower. According to Pierre Loze, Dominique Vautier and Marina Vestre: "this stripped-down façade, almost devoid of any decoration, fits into the pre-rationalist current that was emerging at that time."

Built in 1912, the Van Rysselberghe House was classified as a protected monument in 1997.

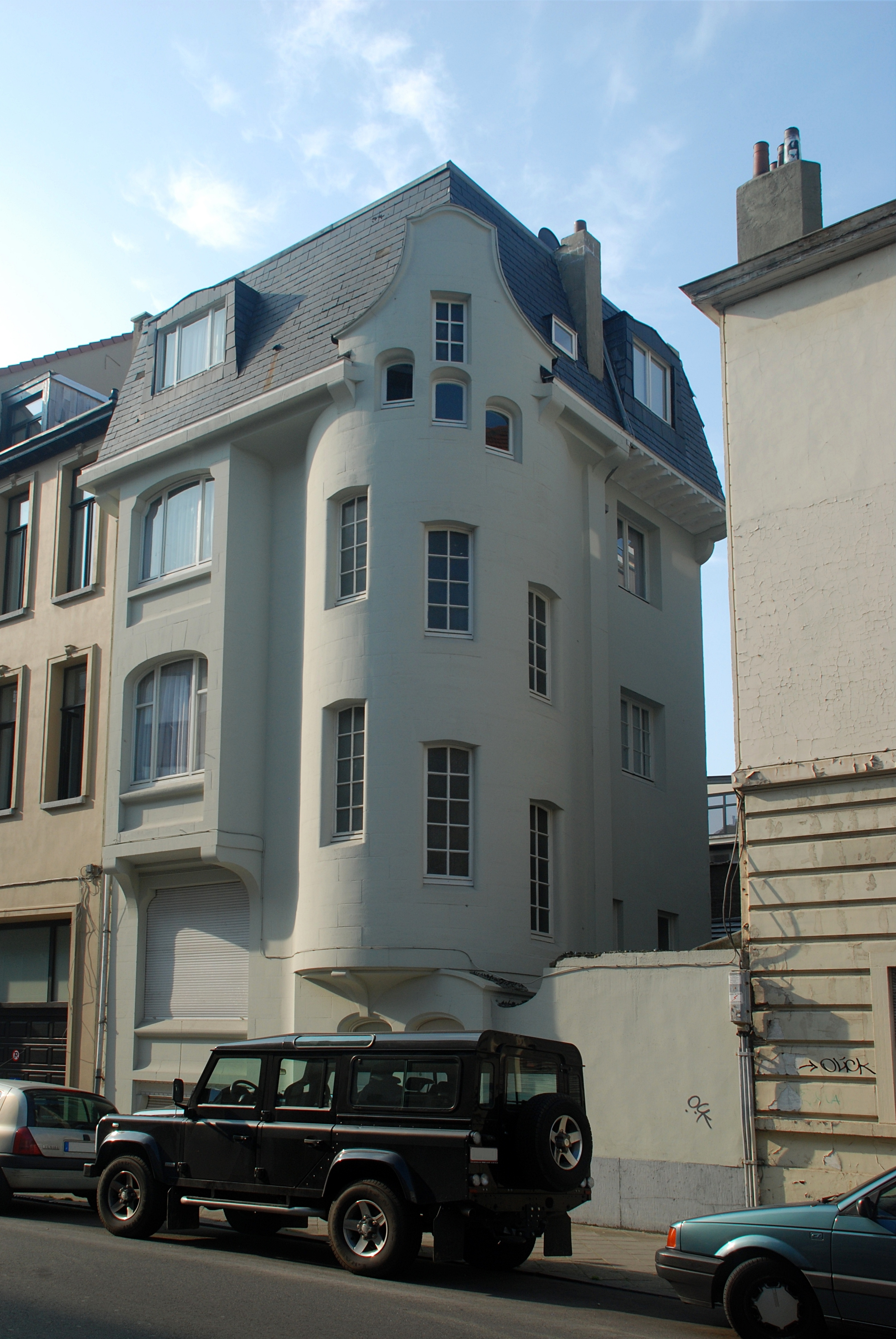
The two façades connected by the corner tower

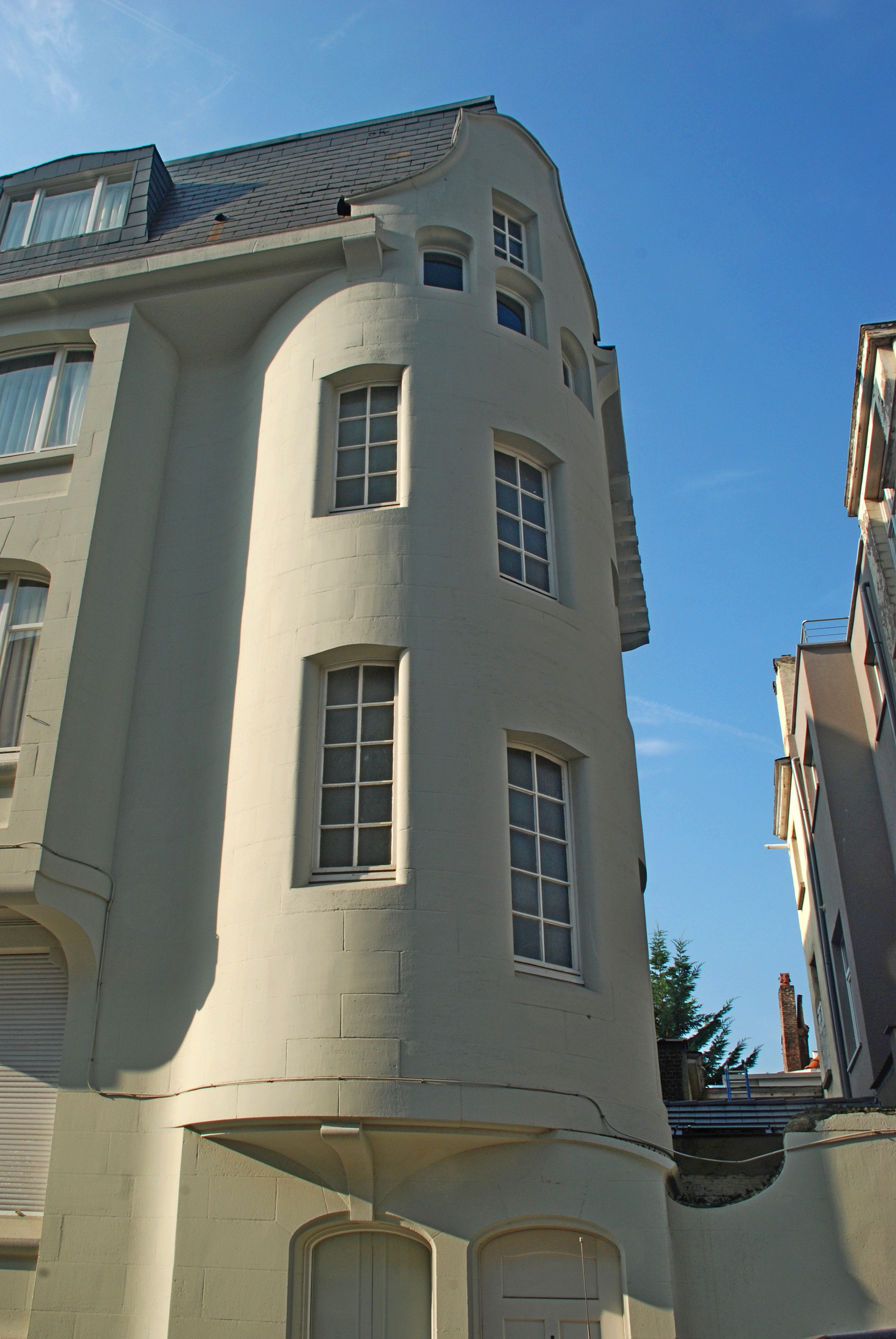
The corner tower

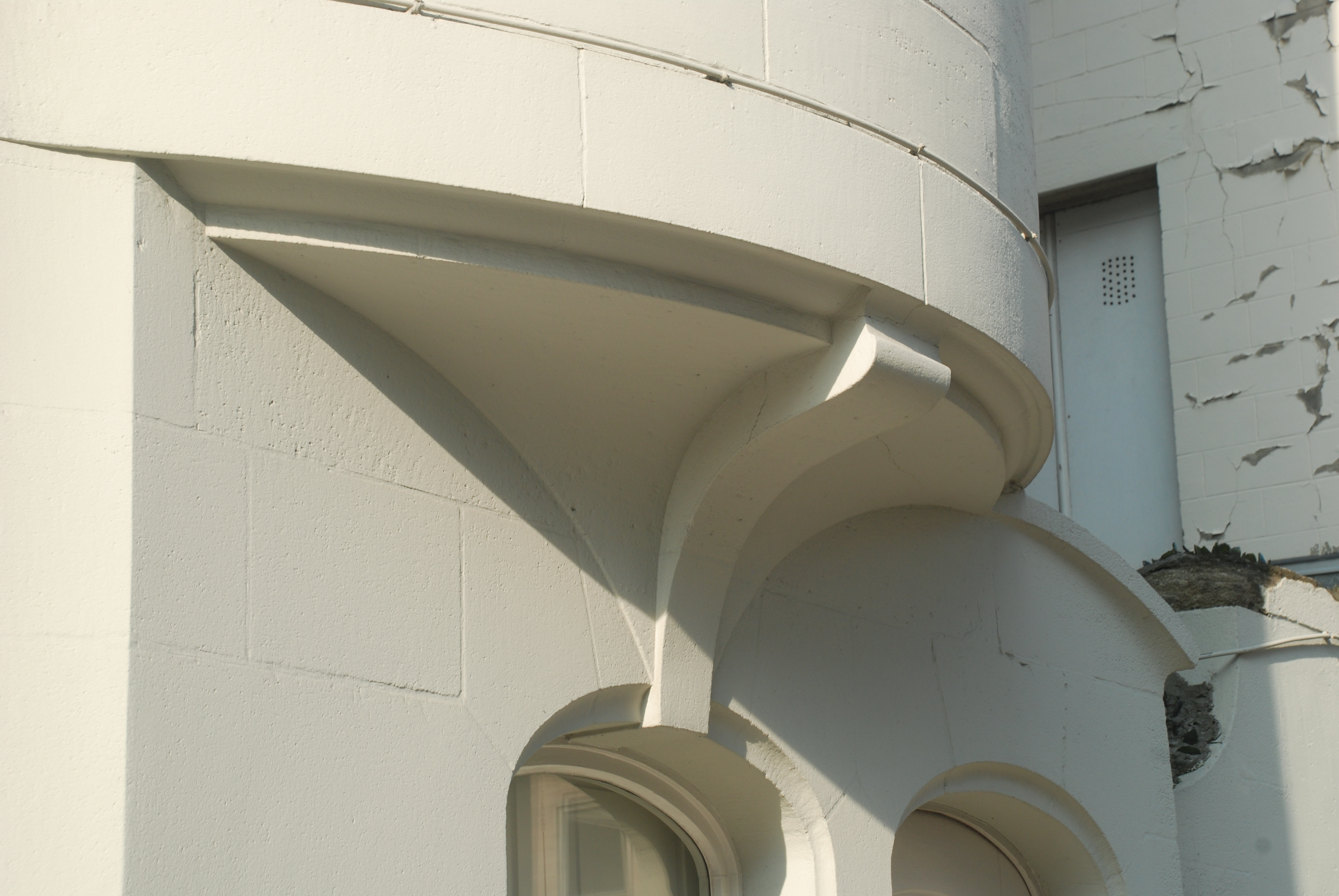
The console supporting the corner tower

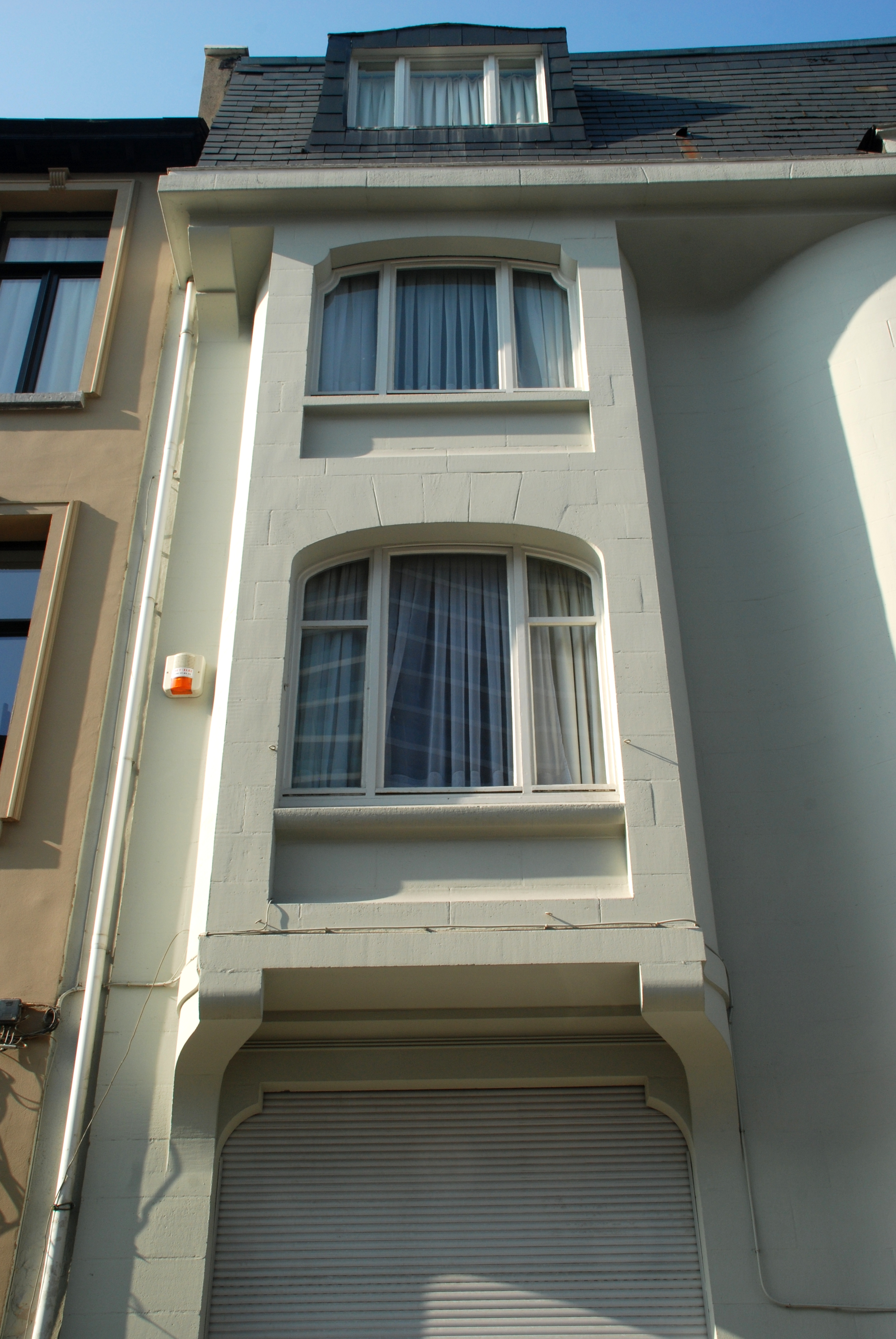
The oriel

== See also ==
- Art Nouveau in Brussels
- History of Brussels
- Culture of Belgium
- Belgium in the long nineteenth century
