= Grand Hôtel Bellevue =

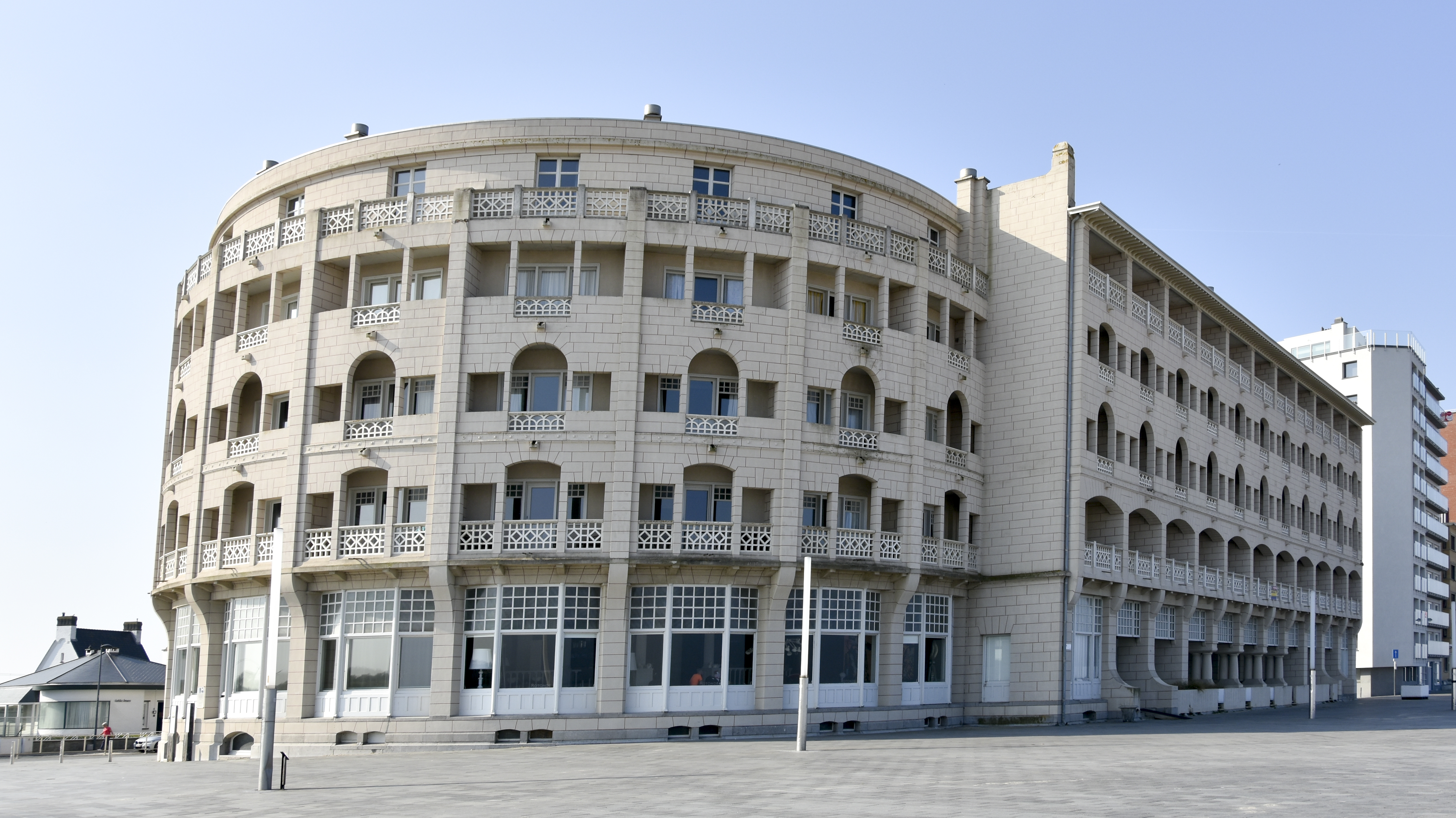
- Interactive map of the Grand Hôtel Bellevue area

General information
- Type: Hotel
- Architectural style: Eclecticism
- Location: Westende, Belgium
- Coordinates: 51°10′31″N 2°47′6″E
- Construction started: 1909
- Completed: 1911

Design and construction
- Architect: Octave van Rysselberghe

The Grand Hôtel Bellevue is a grand hotel designed in the eclecticism style by Octave van Rysselberghe in Westende, West Flanders, Belgium.

In 1984, the facades and roofs of the building were protected as a monument, followed by the interior in 1996. In the fall of 1997, a two-year renovation was started.
