= Minderhout =

- Village
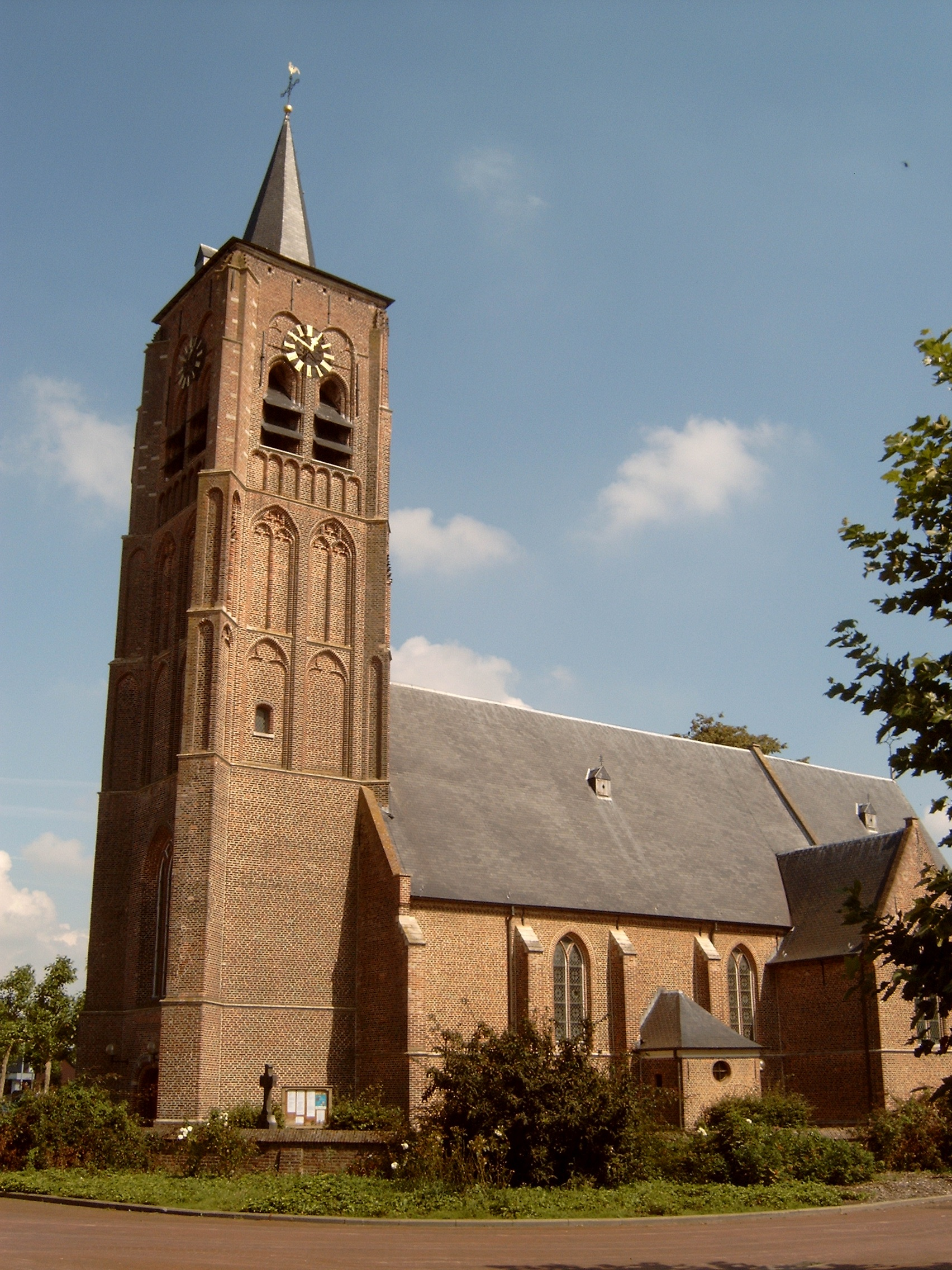
- Church of Saint Clemens. Minderhout, Hoogstraten, Antwerp, Belgium

- Location in Belgium
- Coordinates: 51.4175°N 4.7625°E
- Country: Belgium
- Community: Flemish Community
- Region: Flemish Region
- Province: Antwerp
- Municipality: Hoogstraten

Area
  - Total: 16.01 km^{2} (6.18 sq mi)

Population (2021)
  - Total: 4,420
  - Density: 276/km^{2} (715/sq mi)

Minderhout is a village in the Belgian municipality of Hoogstraten in the province of Antwerp close to the border with the Netherlands. As of 2021, it has about 4,420 inhabitants.

== History ==
The village was first mentioned in 1238 as Minrehout, and means "the smaller forest". Minderhout was founded from Baarle .The Thorn Abbey used to have many possession in Minderhout, and the village and neighbouring Castelré originally belonged to the Land of Breda. During the 14th century, Minderhout became the property of the Lords of Hoogstraten, but Castelré remained with Breda, therefore, the original area was cut in two. In 1794, it became an independent municipality. Minderhout would remain independent until 1977 when it was merged into Hoogstraten.

== Gallery ==
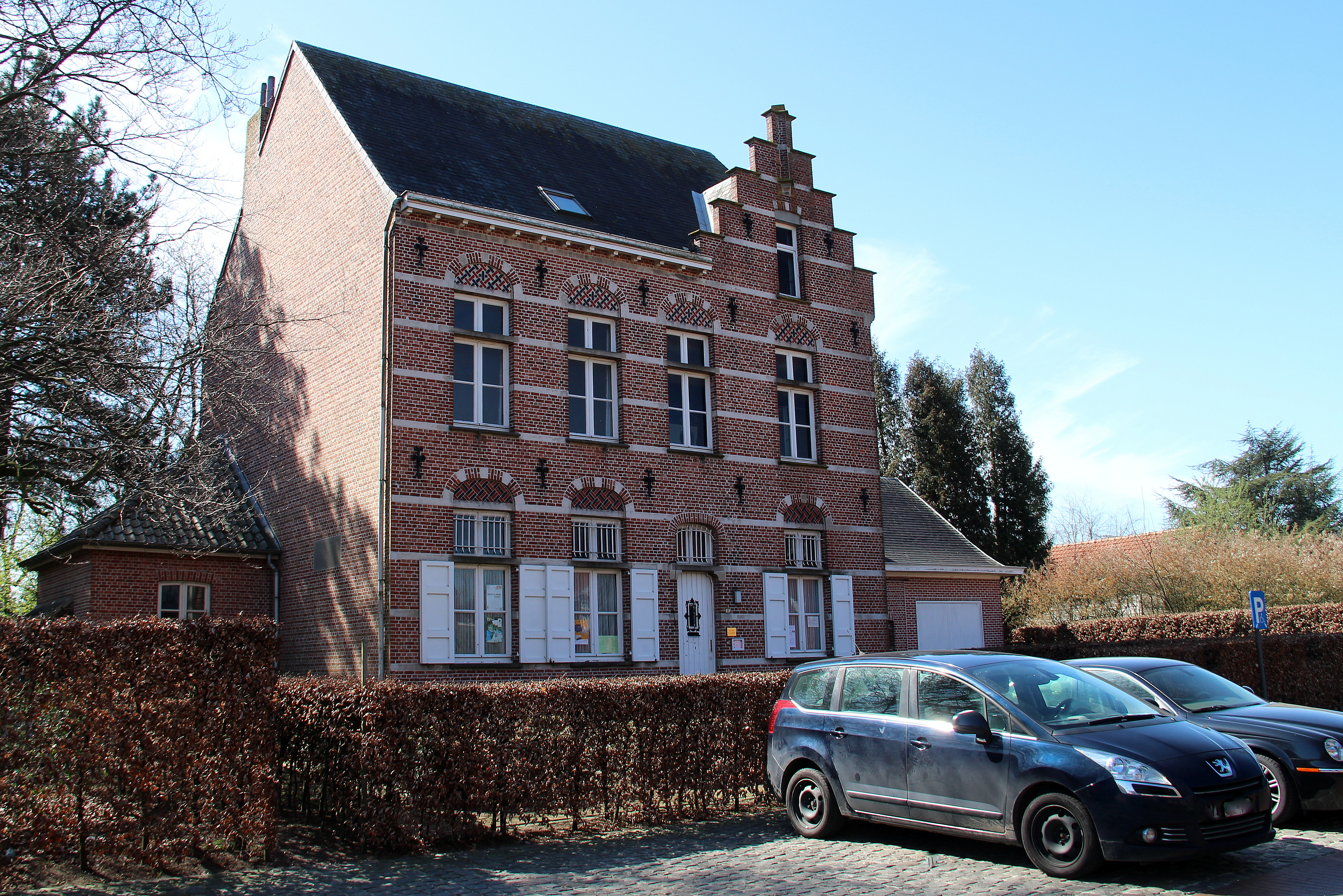
Clergy house

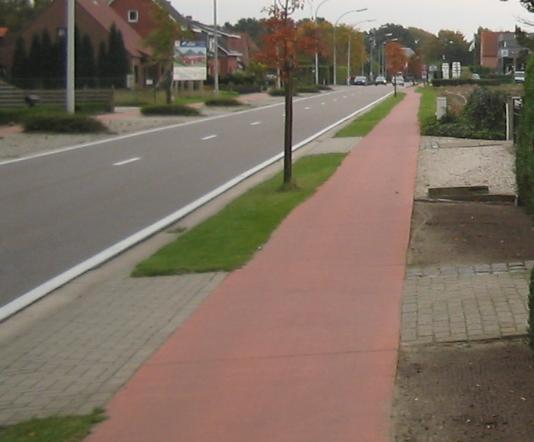
The Fietspad or Bicycle Path in Minderhout, Vlaanderen, Belgium which is separate from the road.

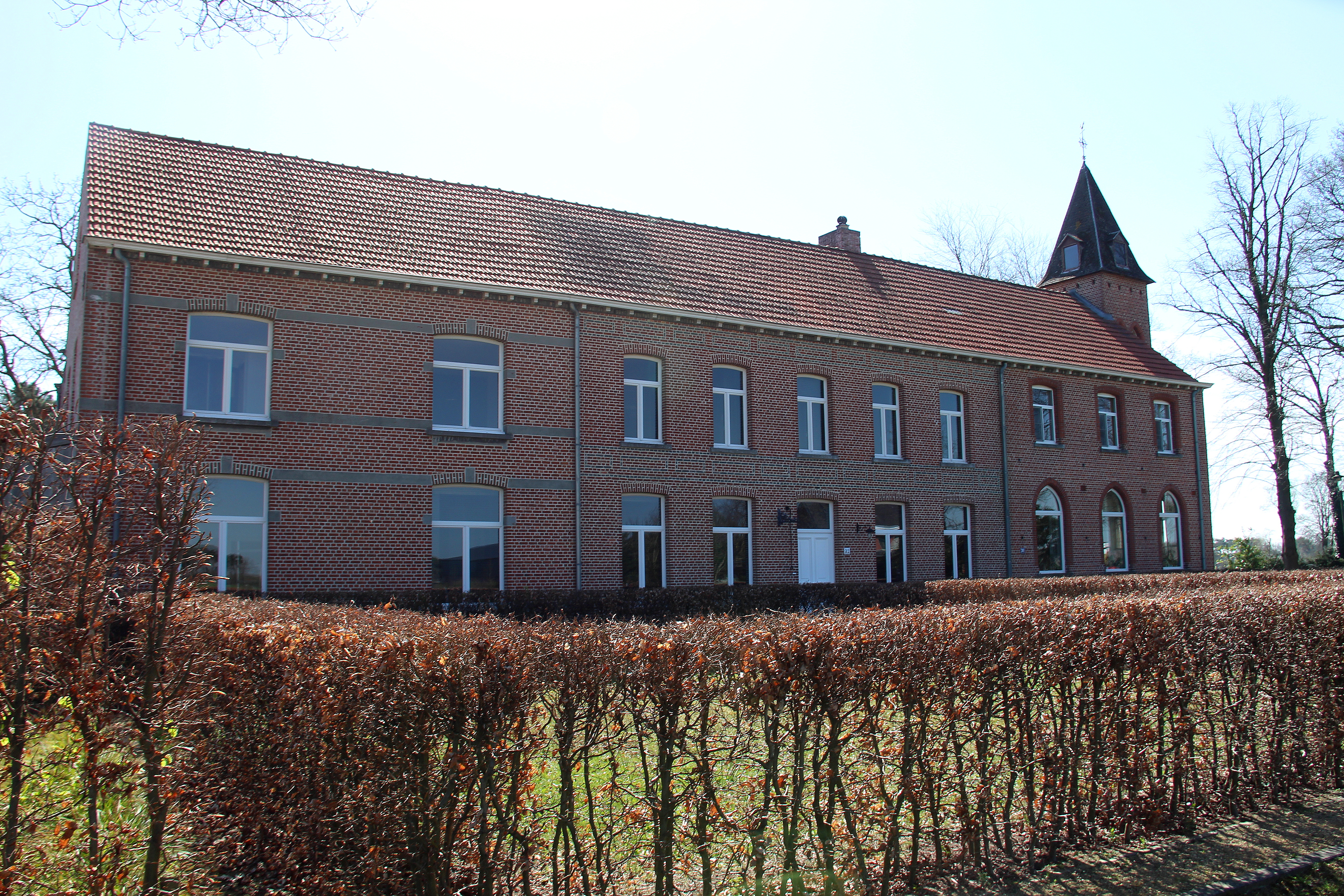
Mission congregation

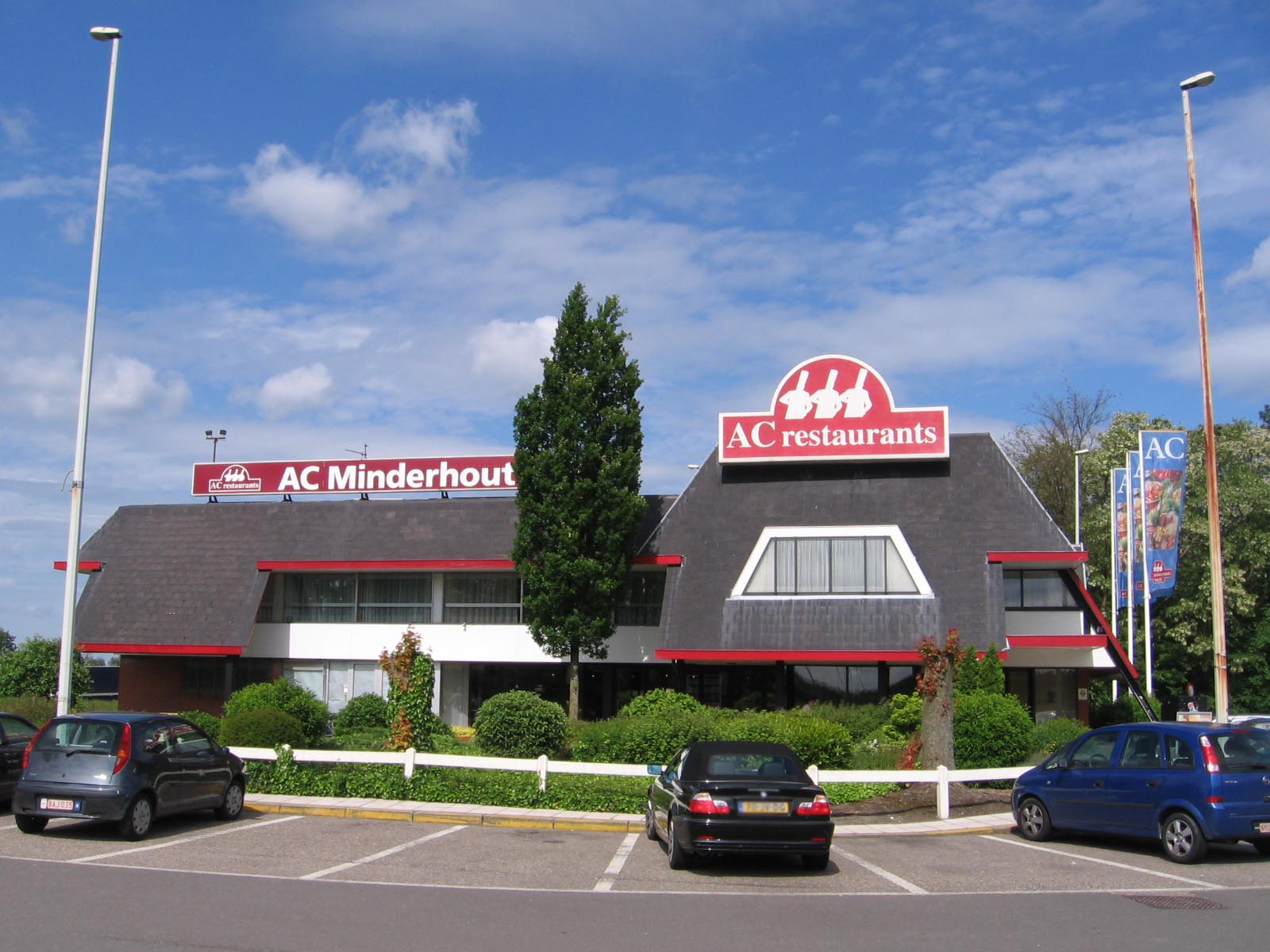
Restaurant in Minderhout
