= Bell Court, Lexington =

- Bell Court Neighborhood Historic District
- U.S. National Register of Historic Places
- U.S. Historic district
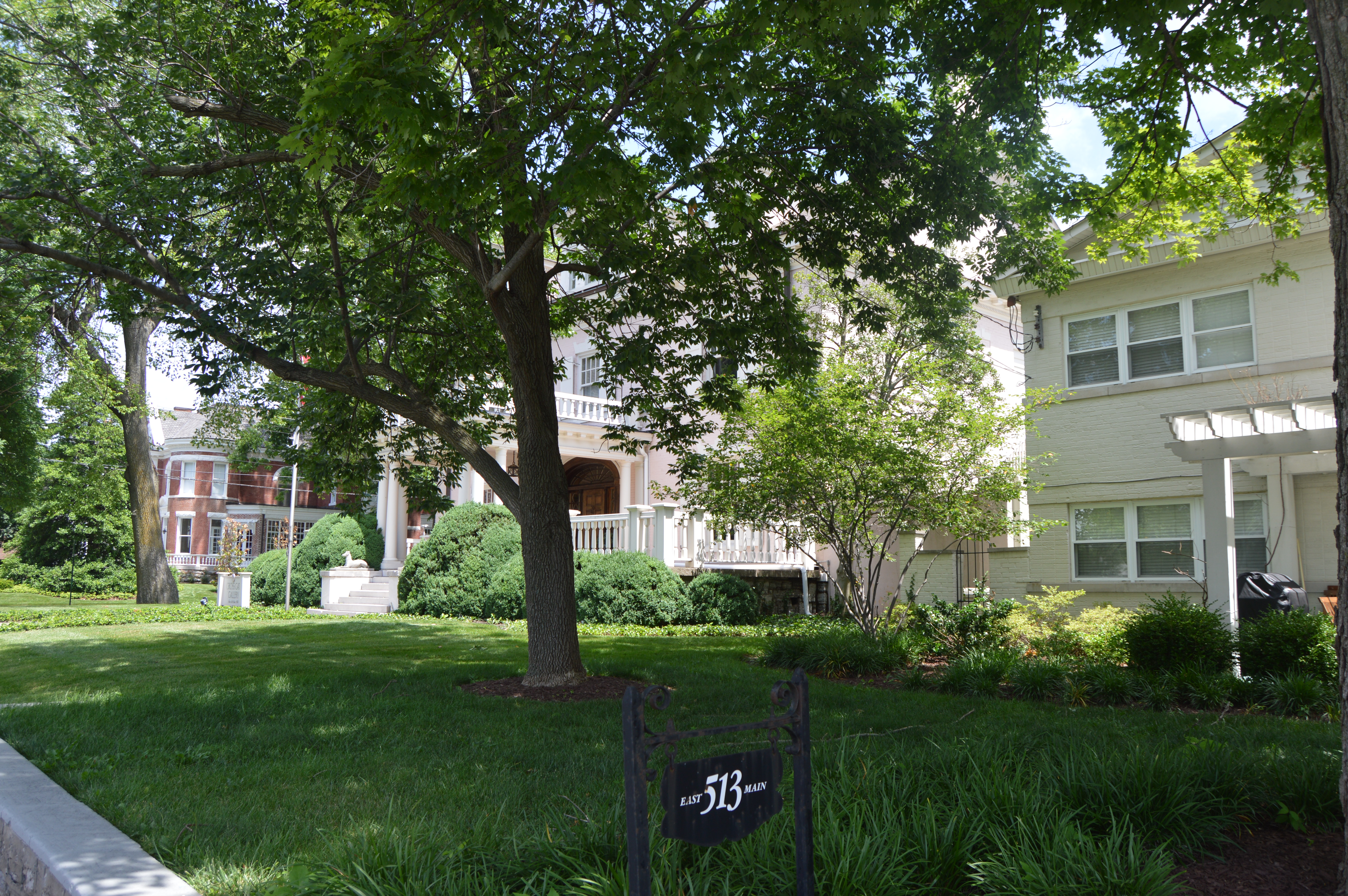
- Main Street east of Forest Street

- Location within Kentucky Location within the United States
- Location: Roughly bounded by Forest Ave., Main St., Boonesboro Ave., and Walton Ave. Lexington, Kentucky
- Coordinates: 38°2′22″N 84°29′9″W
- Area: 42.5 acres (17.2 ha)
- Architect: Multiple
- Architectural style: Italianate, Queen Anne, Romanesque
- NRHP reference No.: 80001507
- Added to NRHP: December 08, 1980

Bell Court is a neighborhood and historic district immediately southeast of Downtown Lexington, Kentucky, United States.

Its boundaries are Boonesboro Avenue to the northeast, Walton Avenue to the southeast, East Main Street to the southwest, and Forest Avenue and Delmar Avenue to the northwest.

Since 1992 the Bell Court Neighborhood Association, which works with and advocates on behalf of the neighborhood has been a registered 501(c)3 nonprofit organization.

In 2006, the Bell Court Neighborhood was designated a Preserve America Community.

== Neighborhood statistics ==
- Area: 0.067 square miles (0.17 km^{2})
- Population: 444
- Population density: 663 people per square mile
- Median household income: $55,512
