= KMLD =

- Casper, Wyoming; United States
- Frequency: 94.5 MHz
- Branding: Melody 94.5

Programming
- Format: Oldies

Ownership
- Owner: Mt. Rushmore Broadcasting, Inc.
- Sister stations: KVOC, KHOC, KQLT, KASS

History
- First air date: May 11, 1979
- Former call signs: KAWY (1979–1985); KGRQ (1985–1989); KMGW (1989–2001)
- Former frequencies: 97.3 MHz
- Call sign meaning: Melody

Technical information
- Licensing authority: FCC
- Facility ID: 11927
- Class: C
- ERP: 63,000 watts; 65,000 watts (with beam tilt)
- HAAT: 582 meters (1,909 ft)
- Transmitter coordinates: 42°44′3″N 106°20′0″W

Links
- Public license information: Public file; LMS

KMLD (94.5 FM) is a commercial radio station licensed to Casper, Wyoming, United States. KMLD airs an oldies music format branded as "Melody 94.5".

All Mt. Rushmore Casper stations are located at 218 N. Wolcott in downtown Casper. The transmitter is located on Casper Mountain.

== History ==
The 94.5 frequency started as KAWY, receiving its license to cover on May 11, 1979.

The station was one of four radio stations broadcasting to Casper at the time. The others were KTWO, KVOC, and sister KATI. As KAWY, the station was referred to as Y94 and later KY 94. In 1981, KAWY and then KATI were sold to Stuart Broadcasting. After operating at a loss due to newcomer KTRS-FM, the station was sold a year later to a Colorado company. KAWY played an album oriented rock format, as it could not compete with KTRS. The stations were sold again in 1985, to a local businessman. The station was flipped to KGRQ, using the slogan "Gourmet Rock". The stations continued to lose money and both stations were taken silent in the fall of 1987. KGRQ returned to air in 1988, thanks to KTWO radio.

The station changed calls to KMGW on May 15, 1989. The station was known as Magic 94.5, carrying an adult contemporary/variety format. The KMGW calls were moved to 96.7 in 1997 (which would become KRNK).

The current incarnation started at 97.3 FM in 1997, and was owned by Hart Media. The station was known as "Melody 97.3". The station was later sold along with the other Hart Media Stations to Mountain States Broadcasting in 1998. Mountain States owned KTRS-FM (then on 95.5 FM), KRVK (which had just signed on at 107.7 FM), and KYOD (on 104.7 FM).

The station was sold once again when Clear Channel Communications bought Mountain States Broadcasting. The present owner is Mt. Rushmore Broadcasting. A short while after being bought by Mt. Rushmore, the station moved down to 94.5 FM. Citing technical difficulties, the station, along with its five other sister stations went dark for a period of time in August 2011. KVOC, KMLD, and KHOC remained silent as of December 17, 2011. Other than equipment reasons, no further information as to why the three stations were off the air had been provided.

== Fines ==
KMLD, along with other Casper stations owned by Mt. Rushmore Broadcasting were fined $68,000 for using unlicensed studio transmitter links, which the company had been using for 16 years. The FCC fined the company $68,000 for "willfully and repeatedly" violating the law, giving the stations' owner 30 days to get licenses for its STLs for KHOC, and sister stations KHOC, KASS, and KQLT. In 2012, station owner Jan Charles Gray was named in a lawsuit by the U.S. Department of Labor for improperly paying employees. Gray called the claims in the lawsuit "bogus".

In 2013, Gray informed the Casper Star Tribune that the lawsuit and a $68,000 fine for unlicensed STLs were "a lot of baloney." Gray said if the FCC doesn't back down, he plans to "sue them on behalf of every radio owner in America that has been wronged by them".
