= KATI (Wyoming) =

Radio station in Casper, Wyoming

- Casper, Wyoming; United States
- Frequency: 1400 kHz

Programming
- Format: Album-oriented rock, simulcast with KGRQ

Ownership
- Owner: Mountain West Broadcasting, Inc.

History
- First air date: May 5, 1956; 70 years ago
- Last air date: November 21, 1987; 38 years ago

Technical information
- Power: 1,000 watts
- Transmitter coordinates: 42°51′22″N 106°21′41″W

KATI was a radio station broadcasting on 1400 AM in Casper, Wyoming, United States. It operated from 1956 to 1987, folding due to a series of financial problems with its final owner. The license was eventually donated to the University of Wyoming, but an attempt by the university to auction the facility failed, and it never returned to the air.

== History ==
=== Early years ===
On November 16, 1955, the Federal Communications Commission awarded a construction permit to John L. "Jack" Breece for a new radio station to broadcast with 250 watts on 1400 kHz in Casper, initially called KTOO. Breece had newspaper and radio interests in Lander. From a site on U.S. Route 87 west of Casper and studios in the Midwest Building on Wolcott Street, KATI debuted on May 5, 1956, though not before thieves stole some of its ground wire from the transmitter site.

After building the station, Breece sold KATI to Ken Prather and his wife Misha in 1957; Prather had been on the station's staff since it started and had 10 years of experience in Casper radio. Not long after the transaction, Patrick Meenan, a Casper city councilman, bought a stake in KATI. After the sale, KATI moved to new studios on McKinley Street, and in 1961, it increased power from 250 to 1,000 watts. That same year, it also became the first-ever CBS radio affiliate in the state, losing the hookup to KTWO in 1981. Meenan bought the remainder of KATI from the Prathers in December 1963; KATI Corporation was replaced by Casper Family Radio as the licensee the next year.

A lot of people in Casper had their musical taste established by that radio station.

— Randy Hall, owner of KATI from 1984 to 1987

After Meenan's takeover, a facilities improvement and expansion program began. In 1965, the station acquired land in the Holiday Hills area of Casper and built a new studio facility on 1400 KATI Lane. On June 30, 1966, Casper Family Radio was granted a construction permit to expand its radio family with a new FM station on 94.5 MHz, and it filed to build a new station in Green River the next year. The FM station, KAWY, went on the air in September 1967. A month prior, KATI became the first Wyoming radio station to initiate 24-hour broadcasting. KATI maintained a Top 40 format into the 1980s; it also had other program features, including local news and coverage of high school sports, and it was generally an audience leader in Casper's radio ratings.

=== Turbulence in the 1980s and shutdown ===
The 1980s would prove to be the station's most turbulent decade. At the end of 1980, Meenan sold KATI and KAWY to Stuart Broadcasting Co. of Lincoln, Nebraska, for $1.55 million. Despite promising there would be no changes, Stuart fired several staffers, including sports announcer Bob Coleman, upon taking control in July 1981; Coleman alleged he was dismissed because he had tried to unionize KATI. The station dropped its contemporary format and flipped to country.

Unfortunately, we could never get the numbers to beat the KTRS monster.

— Randy Hall, reflecting in 2009 on KATI's demise

It was under the country format that Stuart sold KATI and KAWY to a new corporation—Mountain West Broadcasting, headed by Casper businessman Randy Hall—for $833,000. The stations were suffering financially, had deferred maintenance, and were slumping in the ratings, in part because of the country flip. As a result, Mountain West converted KATI and KAWY to a simulcast, KATI-AM-FM, and restored the contemporary hit radio format. That lasted less than a year; when KATI lured away Terry Gross, a former announcer who had been fired from KTWO, it adopted the Music of Your Life syndicated oldies format in September. That format, in turn, lasted less than a year before management switched KATI to a simulcast of the FM station, KGRQ, and its album-oriented rock programming in August 1986. However, there were two factors beyond KATI itself that were hurting the station, no matter its format: the oil crash hurting the regional economy and the rise of KTRS-FM, a new Casper station that had signed on in 1981 and became one of the highest-rated radio stations in the United States.

The frequent changes on air reflected the instability at KATI's corporate parent. In November 1985, Mountain West Broadcasting filed for Chapter 11 bankruptcy protection after Stuart Broadcasting, which had sold the station, sued it for more than $800,000 in unpaid debts. A court approved a restructuring plan for Mountain West in January 1987, but it was not enough. November 21, 1987, became "the day the music died" in Casper when, at 11:52 p.m., KATI and KGRQ played a short announcement informing listeners of the stations' demise and one last song, "American Pie", before going silent.

In the aftermath of the shutdown, Mountain West's Chapter 11 proceeding was converted to a Chapter 7 liquidation; a federal judge affirmed that the stations' assets belonged to Stuart Broadcasting in May 1988, but Patrick Meenan—who still owned the building in which the stations operated—refused to cede the property to Stuart and proceeded to foreclose on a storage lien, scheduling a public auction of the physical plant to which Stuart objected and obtained an order to block. Stuart Broadcasting spokesman Scott Stuart had pledged to restore KATI and KGRQ to operating status if his company regained control of the stations. However, Stuart instead opted to sell both stations once the licenses were awarded in court.

=== University of Wyoming ownership ===
They had the option of turning that into a 1,000-watt AM stereo signal. One thousand watts would be a lot better than 10.

— Jack Rosenthal, comparing the KATI facilities to KUWR's Casper translator

Concurrent transfers of the KATI and KGRQ licenses from a bankruptcy trustee to Stuart and from Stuart to Clear Channel Radio, Inc. (no relation to Clear Channel Communications) were filed on December 14, 1988, and granted in March 1989. Clear Channel Radio was owned by Jack Rosenthal and Robert D. Price. Clear Channel Radio, owner of KTWO, could not retain both AM stations and spun off KATI to the University of Wyoming as a donation.

The University of Wyoming never put KATI back into service, though it pursued private and public uses for the station. Apparently scared off by the high cost of such a maneuver, it instead took bids on the KATI license and miscellaneous equipment in 1991; the high bid of $35,500 came from Bill and Melody Hart, owners of KTRS-FM. However, the UW rejected all three bids as too low—and because of the objection of Rosenthal to the sale of his gift to one of his competitors—and announced it would make a go of raising funds to use KATI as a repeater of its public radio station, KUWR, which had only a 10-watt FM translator to serve the Casper area. Those efforts would not amount to anything; citing the improvement of the FM signal of Wyoming Public Radio in the Casper area, the university announced that it would let the license expire in March 1993. Rosenthal was disappointed by the university's decision not to use the station for the purpose he had intended upon donating it, to improve KUWR's signal to Casper.
