= KMGW =

KMGW may refer to:

- KMGW (FM), a radio station (99.3 FM) licensed to serve Naches, Washington, United States
- KRNK, a radio station in Casper, Wyoming, United States known as KMGW from 2001 to 2009
- KMLD, a radio station in Casper, Wyoming, known as KMGW from 1989 to 2001
- KQQL, a radio station in Anoka, Minnesota, United States known as KMGW from 1984 to 1986
- The ICAO airport code for Morgantown Municipal Airport in Morgantown, West Virginia, United States
