= KHOC =

- Casper, Wyoming; United States
- Broadcast area: Casper, Wyoming
- Frequency: 102.5 MHz
- Branding: Heart 102.5

Programming
- Format: Adult contemporary

Ownership
- Owner: Mt. Rushmore Broadcasting, Inc.
- Sister stations: KMLD, KVOC, KQLT, KASS

History
- First air date: 1997
- Former call signs: KKRR (1997–1998)

Technical information
- Licensing authority: FCC
- Facility ID: 15925
- Class: C
- ERP: 100,000 watts
- HAAT: 517 meters (1,696 ft)
- Transmitter coordinates: 42°44′37″N 106°18′31″W

Links
- Public license information: Public file; LMS

KHOC (102.5 FM, "Heart 102.5") is a commercial radio station located in Casper, Wyoming.

All Mt. Rushmore Casper stations are located at 218 N. Wolcott in downtown Casper. The station's transmitter is sited atop Casper Mountain.

== History ==
The station was first known as KKRR, starting on 1997-10-06. On 1998-10-23, the station changed its call sign to the current KHOC. Citing technical difficulties, the station, along with its five other sister stations went dark for a period of time in August 2011. KVOC, KMLD, and KHOC remained silent as of December 17, 2011. Other than equipment reasons, no further information as to why the three stations were off the air has been provided.

== Fines ==
KHOC, along with other Casper stations owned by Mt. Rushmore Broadcasting were fined $68,000 for using unlicensed studio transmitter links, which the company had been using for 16 years. The FCC fined the company $68,000 for "willfully and repeatedly" violating the law, giving the stations' owner 30 days to get licenses for its STLs for KHOC, and sister stations KMLD, KASS, and KQLT. In 2012, station owner Jan Charles Gray was named in a lawsuit by the U.S. Department of Labor for improperly paying employees. Gray called the claims in the lawsuit "bogus". In 2013, Gray informed the Casper Star Tribune that the lawsuit and a $68,000 fine for unlicensed STLs was "a lot of baloney." Gray said if the FCC doesn't back down, he plans to "sue them on behalf of every radio owner in America that has been wronged by them".
