= Matthew Postgate =

British digital strategist

Matthew Postgate (born 10 November 1974) is a British digital technology strategist. He was the BBC's Chief Technical Officer from 2016 to 2020.

== Early life ==
He was born in Hampshire. He is the son of Ian (born 1946) and Rosemary Postgate, who married in Horsham in 1968. His grandparents were Robert Postgate and Vera Barron, who married in 1934. He grew up in Cambridge. He has an older sister. He studied Politics at the University of Bristol from 1994 to 1997.

== Career ==
He graduated from university when the dot-com bubble was precariously developing, and he worked for a dot-com bubble company from 1999 to 2001.

He joined the BBC in 2003. From 2007 to 2008 he was controller of BBC mobile. He became the Controller of BBC Research & Development, which employed around 150 people. He became Chief Technology Officer on 28 July 2014. The BBC's much-heralded Digital Media Initiative was scrapped, which had been planned to start by 2011.

He became Chief Technology and Product Officer in April 2016, responsible for the BBC Design & Engineering division. He announced his resignation internally from the BBC on 30 July 2020, his last day being 1 September 2020. His remuneration was £317,000.

=== Directorships ===
His past and present directorships include;

- YouView as a Director from 10 September 2010 to 5 November 2014.
- Strategic Command (United Kingdom) as a Non-executive director from 28 January 2020.
- Verian as a Non-executive director from Oct 2022.

== Personal life ==
He lives in Maida Vale.
