= KTRS =

KTRS may refer to:

- KTRS (AM), a radio station (550 AM) licensed to St. Louis, Missouri, United States
- KTRS-FM, a radio station (104.7 FM) licensed to Casper, Wyoming, United States
