= Patrick Meenan (politician) =

American politician from Wyoming

49th Speaker of the Wyoming House of Representatives
- In office January 13, 1987 – January 10, 1989
- Preceded by: Jack Sidi
- Succeeded by: Bill McIlvain

Member of the Wyoming House of Representatives from Natrona County
- In office January 14, 1969 – January 10, 1989
- Preceded by: William F. Swanton
- Succeeded by: Carol Jo Vlastos

Mayor of Casper, Wyoming
- In office January 8, 1962 – October 31, 1965
- Preceded by: William Earnshaw
- Succeeded by: James A. Barlow

Personal details
- Born: Patrick Henry Meenan; May 12, 1923 Casper, Wyoming, U.S.
- Died: August 16, 2001 (aged 73) Casper, Wyoming, U.S.
- Party: Republican
- Spouse: Shirley Louise Byron (m. 1950)
- Children: 4
- Education: University of Notre Dame (BS)

Patrick Henry Meenan (September 24, 1927 – August 16, 2001) was a Wyoming politician accountant, and radio station owner.

Meenan served as mayor of Casper, Wyoming and as speaker of the Wyoming House of Representatives. He was a member of the Wyoming House from 1968 to 1988. He was a Republican.

Meenan was trained as an accountant. He was also the owner of KATI and KAWY radio stations from 1957 to 1981.

Meenan began as a member of the Casper City council in the 1950s. From 1962 to 1965 he was mayor of Casper. Under his administration the number of paved streets in the city was significantly increased.

He and his wife Shirley were the parents of four children.

== Sources ==
- Billings Gazette article on Meenan's death
