= Materiality (architecture) =

Materiality in architecture is a concept or the applied use of various materials or substances in the medium of building. This concept was previously regarded as a secondary consideration in architecture but recently emerged as an important element due to advances in digital fabrication and digital science.

The concept plays an important role in architectural practice, which is actualized through the body and senses of an architect interacting with his physical work environment. It defines critical aspects concerning the governance and engagement of an architectural system.

== Material and materiality ==
Architectural systems are defined by its physical components called materials. These materials serve as the language that articulate architectural vision or that it serves to make architectural ideas tangible. Consciousness of materials is, therefore, considered a requirement for architects.

Material is a relative term in architectural design and so may be used to designate materials which are considered to be virtual, (such as photographs, images or text) or other materials which are natural. Some materials may be considered as combinations of the two. Certain veneers which are composed of images printed on plastic are a good example of this. Observationally, therefore, virtual materials can be said not to exist without a natural physical substrate. Therefore, what separates a virtual material from a natural one is some aspect of the mind and perception as well as a process of representation to produce them. For some, distinguishing these two types of materials is relevant in the process of building because they have different characteristics and attributes. This is highlighted in the case of problems arising from reconciling the physicality of matter and the intangibility of digital materials. On, the other hand, there are those who focus on integration where digital characteristics increasingly enrich materiality.

Materiality in architecture is not limited to theoretical positions on the perceived materiality of images, texts, or other objects of representation. It could denote the materiality of specific projects when considering the full range of materials used. It has also been described as the circumstance that architecture is realized using building materials as well as how a material expresses its properties and idiosyncrasies, allowing their characteristics or appeal to emerge. This is also demonstrated in the way material – in recent understanding of materiality – came to be considered as an active ingredient in the processes of making architecture as opposed to being confined within the context of the social and economic context for architecture.

Discussions on the materiality of architecture are usually synonymous with structural and aesthetic concerns in architectural design and are typically unique with each project. Specific discussions include how the materiality of architecture creates the process of flows that sustain social life. There are other modern interpretations such as the feminist framework introduced in Jennifer Bloomer's projects, which demonstrated metaphoric sites where imaginative narratives are explored.

=== Immateriality ===
Recent conceptualizations of materiality cites an "immateriality" of contemporary architecture, and this is mainly based on the use of virtual material. This discourse draws from the Deleuzian philosophy, which describes virtual as "what every object carries with it" one that is neither its reality nor merely what it could have been but what it is imagined to be. Paul Virilio's notion of the "new window", which pertains to computer terminals and designates video as an architectural element, architecture assumes a dematerialized form, where dimensions are lost with the onset of aesthetic disappearance. The analogy is that "telematics replaces the doorway" and "pixel replaces the bolt". According to Anne Friedberg, the virtual concept operated through a frame that serve as a portal to another world, rendering a characterization where materiality is located on one side of the frame and immateriality on the other.

== See also ==
- Herzog & de Meuron
- Building material
- List of basic design topics
- List of building materials
