= KASS =

- Casper, Wyoming; United States
- Broadcast area: Casper, Wyoming
- Frequency: 106.9 MHz
- Branding: Kick 107

Programming
- Format: Classic rock
- Affiliations: Westwood One

Ownership
- Owner: Mt. Rushmore Broadcasting, Inc.
- Sister stations: KMLD, KHOC, KQLT, KVOC

History
- First air date: October 15, 1990
- Former call signs: KCSP (1990–1993); KPGM (1993–1995)
- Call sign meaning: Shortening of the term Kick-ass or Casper, Wyoming

Technical information
- Licensing authority: FCC
- Facility ID: 43477
- Class: C
- ERP: 94,000 watts; 100,000 watts (beam tilt)
- HAAT: 538 meters (1,765 ft)
- Transmitter coordinates: 42°44′37″N 106°18′31″W

Links
- Public license information: Public file; LMS
- Website: KASS on Facebook

KASS (106.9 FM) is a commercial radio station licensed to Casper, Wyoming, United States. KASS airs a classic rock format branded as "Kick 107". The music programming is syndicated by Westwood One. All Mt. Rushmore Casper stations are located at 218 N. Wolcott in downtown Casper.

== History ==
The station signed on October 15, 1990, as KCSP, a contemporary Christian music radio station. On September 22, 1993, the station changed its call letters to KPGM; the KCSP call letters and the contemporary Christian format moved to 90.3 FM, with KPGM airing religious education programming. In November 1993, the station became "Jukebox 107", an oldies station. The station transitioned into the classic rock format in the fall of 1994. By the beginning of 1995 the station would add hard rock and heavy metal to its playlist. In May 1995, the station changed its name to Kick 107; on May 11, 1995, the station took the KASS call sign.

KASS, along with other Casper stations owned by Mt. Rushmore Broadcasting were fined $68,000 for using unlicensed studio transmitter links, which the company had been using for 16 years. The Federal Communications Commission fined the company $68,000 for "willfully and repeatedly" violating the law, giving the stations' owner 30 days to get licenses for its STLs for KASS, and sister stations KMLD, KHOC, and KQLT.

In 2012, station owner Jan Charles Gray was named in a lawsuit by the United States Department of Labor for improperly paying employees. Gray called the claims in the lawsuit "bogus".

In 2013, Gray informed the Casper Star-Tribune that the lawsuit and a $68,000 fine for unlicensed STLs were "a lot of baloney." Gray said if the FCC does not back down, he plans to "sue them on behalf of every radio owner in America that has been wronged by them".
