= BBC Redux =

Digital archiving system produced by the BBC

BBC Redux was a BBC Research & Development system that digitally recorded television and radio output in the United Kingdom produced by the British Broadcasting Corporation. It operated from 2007 to 2022 and contains several petabytes of recordings and subtitle data. It is notable for being the proof of concept for the Flash Video streaming version of the BBC iPlayer.

It was an internal research project developed for testing which acted as a giant video on demand or personal video recorder (PVR). It contained a complete digital archive, recording both television and radio twenty-four hours a day, of all of the BBC's national and also some regional broadcast output since mid-2007, and automatically compiled without human input. The BBC stated that BBC Redux was one of its major contributions to the field of digital archiving and preservation.

Some accounts for accessing the system on a temporary basis were made available at Mashed 08 and again at Culture Hack Day 2011, providing streaming-only access to BBC content broadcast during the weekend of the event. As well as streaming, the system enables high-quality downloads of television and radio content, and has had the option to download subtitles from programmes since 2008.

BBC Redux had originally been developed at the BBC's Kingswood Warren campus, in only two months, and with the investment required being significantly less than the iPlayer. The saved content can be used for broadcast compliance checking and by BBC programme researchers. BBC Redux was only available to employees, because existing legal contracts with content producers limited how material could be broadcast, distributed and made available to general consumers. The Readme file for associated API frameworks hosted on GitHub states:

BBC Snippets and BBC Redux are tools designed to allow BBC staff to develop new ways to view and navigate content. As such, they're not open to the public.

In May 2022, in a blog post, the BBC confirmed the sunset and ultimate closure of the Redux service. Redux content was migrated to the new BBC Archive Search, which operates on Amazon Web Services. New programmes are delivered to the BBC Archive automatically as they are ingested for playout.

== Technical details ==
The system recorded over 100 megabits per second, continuously. As of August 2011, BBC Redux contained 300,000 hours of recorded audio and video.

A series of standard Digital Video Broadcasting terrestrial antennas and satellite dishes, coupled to DVB-T and DVB-S TV tuner cards were used to capture the incoming DVB multiplexes transmitted for over-the-air Freesat and Freeview terrestrial television. These raw MPEG transport streams are split into single-programme MPEG transport streams, encapsulated in RTP, and sent using UDP IP multicast within the IPv4 multicast address range 233.122.227.0/24 from AS31459. From the multicast streams individual television programmes can be extracted and saved, without requiring any transcoding or conversion of the contained MPEG-2 video data.

As of May 2009, racks of Sun Fire T1000 and T2000 machines were used acquiring and storing the incoming programmes respectively; while commodity x86-64 computers were used for database operations and playback transcoding. The T2000 storage nodes were connected by 10 Gigabit Ethernet on the network side, and then by serial attached SCSI to RAID boxes containing high-capacity commodity Serial ATA hard disk drives. The "fsck-free" ZFS file system was used after experiments with Unix File System (UFS) proved it to be too slow. Sun Microsystems had to manually repair the filesystems on two occasions using Unix dd.

The software was based on open source technologies, and used a combination of mod_perl and C running on OpenSolaris. A series of "lolcat" images were used for the system's HTTP 404 and error pages.

Different formats were available for download, including the raw MPEG-TS files and compressed MPEG-4 and FLV versions of the files.

BBC Redux content was migrated to BBC Archive Search after the project was discontinued. All recordings from non-BBC channels were removed shortly after the launch of BBC Archive Search. BBC Redux data is still held by the BBC Archive and is still used for research purposes, including in datasets.

== Projects ==
As part of the European Union (EU) "NoTube" project running between 2009–12, a recommendation research system using Lonclass categorisation and Tanimoto coefficient matching was tested by the BBC R&D Audience Experience team and integrated with 23,000 recordings delivered from Redux. The matching dataset was gathered over a period of five months.

For a BBC Digital Media Initiative (DMI) demonstration entitled "Million Minutes", files from the BBC's D-3 video tape archive were imported into the Redux system during 2009–2010. This also used commercial software from Artesia Digital Media Group and involved creating a representational state transfer (REST) interface onto the content stored within Redux.

During 2010, Safari and Google Chrome browser extensions were developed to integrate Redux content with the main www.bbc.co.uk/programmes directory.

In January 2012, the BBC's Multimedia Classification team announced they were hoping to test and add "mood-based navigation" to the existing BBC Redux interface, along with audience measurement and other rich metadata comprising work part-funded by the Technology Strategy Board. During 2010–2011 BBC Research and Development integrated content archived in BBC Redux with the BBC's existing internal BBC InFax system, allowing finding of metadata and archive content within the same browser window, covering news and subtitles from over the previous five years.

During March 2012, the Atlas index changed the method of equivalence matching used for indexing against BBC Redux.
