= KQLT =

- Casper, Wyoming; United States
- Broadcast area: Casper, Wyoming
- Frequency: 103.7 MHz
- Branding: Kolt Country

Programming
- Format: Country music

Ownership
- Owner: Mt. Rushmore Broadcasting, Inc.

History
- First air date: 1983; 43 years ago

Technical information
- Licensing authority: FCC
- Facility ID: 47878
- Class: C
- ERP: 97,000 watts
- HAAT: 567 meters (1,860 ft)
- Transmitter coordinates: 42.744°N 106.309°W

Links
- Public license information: Public file; LMS
- Website: www.facebook.com/KQLTCountry

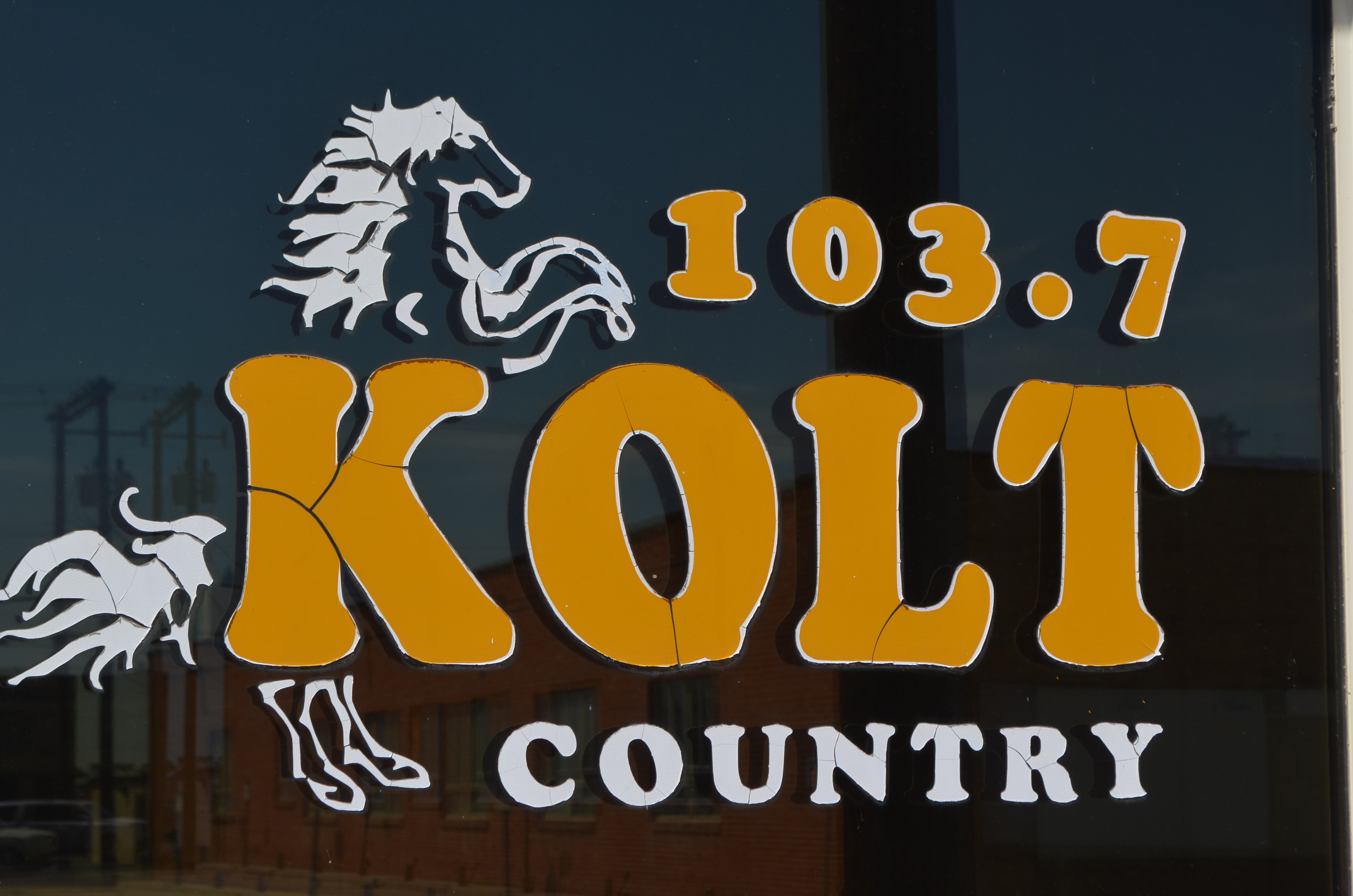

KQLT is a commercial radio station located in Casper, Wyoming, broadcasting on 103.7 FM. KQLT airs a country music format branded as "Kolt Country". The music programming is syndicated by Dial Global Networks.

The station began with an easy listening format in the 1980s. Later in that decade, the station changed to an oldies music format, and then in the 1990s changed again to its present country music format.

All Mt. Rushmore Casper stations are located at 218 N. Wolcott in downtown Casper. KQLT's sister stations are KMLD, KHOC, KVOC, and KASS.

== Fines ==
KQLT, along with other Casper stations owned by Mt. Rushmore Broadcasting were fined $68,000 for using unlicensed studio transmitter links, which the company had been using for 16 years. The FCC fined the company $68,000 for "willfully and repeatedly" violating the law, giving the stations' owner 30 days to get licenses for its STLs for KQLT, and sister stations KMLD, KASS, and KHOC. In 2012, station owner Jan Charles Gray was named in a lawsuit by the U.S. Department of Labor for improperly paying employees. Gray called the claims in the lawsuit "bogus". In 2013, Gray informed the Casper Star Tribune that the lawsuit and a $68,000 fine for unlicensed STLs were "a lot of baloney". Gray said if the FCC did not back down, he planned to "sue them on behalf of every radio owner in America that has been wronged by them".
