= KVOC =

- Casper, Wyoming; United States
- Frequency: 1230 kHz
- Branding: KVOC 1230 AM

Programming
- Format: Talk radio
- Affiliations: Cumulus Media

Ownership
- Owner: Mt. Rushmore Broadcasting, Inc.
- Sister stations: KMLD, KHOC, KQLT, KASS

History
- First air date: November 27, 1946
- Call sign meaning: Voice of Casper

Technical information
- Licensing authority: FCC
- Facility ID: 35861
- Class: C
- Power: 1,000 watts (unlimited)
- Transmitter coordinates: 42°50′5″N 106°17′44″W
- Translator: 95.9 K240EW (Casper)

Links
- Public license information: Public file; LMS

KVOC (1230 AM) is a commercial radio station licensed to Casper, Wyoming, United States. KVOC's transmitter is located at the corner of 15th Street and Beverly. The former studios were located near the tower. KVOC's studios are located in downtown Casper, at 218 North Wolcott.

== History ==
The station got its start in 1946, and for a number of years was one of only three radio stations operating in Casper. KVOC was owned by Natrona Country Tribune. The station was bought by Harry and Alice Bubeck in 1964. The station remained under the ownership of one of the Bubecks until being sold to its current owner Mt. Rushmore Broadcasting in the late 1990s. After the sale Alice continued her Morning Magazine program on the station.

KVOC started out with a middle of the road (music) format.

In 1964, the station was purchased by Harry and Alice Bubeck. Under their leadership, KVOC became Casper's country music outlet in the late 1960s and was one of the first in the region to transition to stereo broadcasting. This format ended some time in the late 1990s, when it was sold to its current owner. At that time it changed over to an oldies format, before switching to an adult standards format. After that the station was an ESPN Radio affiliate. Although competing radio station KKTL is now the ESPN Radio affiliate, the logo is still painted on the window of the station's downtown Casper studio.

During the 1990s, before the sale of the station it was the home of The Rush Limbaugh Show. While the first two hours were broadcast live the last hour was run one hour later at 1 pm instead of 12 noon, in order to allow the station to air its own programming in that time slot. The station also aired programming from the Northern Ag Network, weather forecasts from Don Day, its own "Sky Watch" forecasts, Paul Harvey, and the American Country Countdown. KVOC was one of Casper's first country radio stations to be heard in stereo. The station did not broadcast in stereo. Instead the local cable company rebroadcast this station on the FM dial. Cable subscribers who plugged their coaxial cable into their stereo could listen to KVOC, and channels like HBO through the stereo. This service was known as cable stereo, or cable radio, or cable FM.

KVOC went off the air for a time. The station was brought back to life in 2013, and was reported to be planning to air an all talk format.

Currently, KVOC operates as "1230 AM The Voice of Casper," utilizing a talk radio format. It is the flagship home for The Chuck Gray Show, a conservative program hosted by the son of the station's owner, Jan Charles Gray.

== Programming ==
KVOC features a talk radio format. The station has stopped airing ESPN Radio's programming. The ESPN programming was picked up by competitor KKTL (1400 AM). Also for much of its life it has been affiliated with ABC Radio.

== Studio and signal ==
KVOC's transmitter is located next to the former studio on east 15th Street. Its present studio is located at 218 North Wolcott in downtown Casper, along with its sister stations. With its 1,000 watt signal, KVOC reaches most of central Wyoming. Citing technical difficulties, the station, along with its five other sister stations went dark for a period of time in August 2011. KVOC, KMLD, and KHOC remained silent at the end of 2011. Other than equipment reasons, no further information as to why the three stations were off the air had been provided.

In June 2012, KVOC advised the U.S. Federal Communications Commission that it was off the air due to financial difficulties. The station was on air for a period of days in 2012, however, broadcasting a dead carrier. The station, along with its sister FMs has been the subject of several fines in the past. In 2013, Gray informed the Casper Star Tribune that the lawsuit and a $68,000 fine for unlicensed STLs were "a lot of baloney." Gray said if the FCC doesn't back down, he plans to "sue them on behalf of every radio owner in America that has been wronged by them".
