= Universal Decimal Classification =

Bibliographic and library classification system

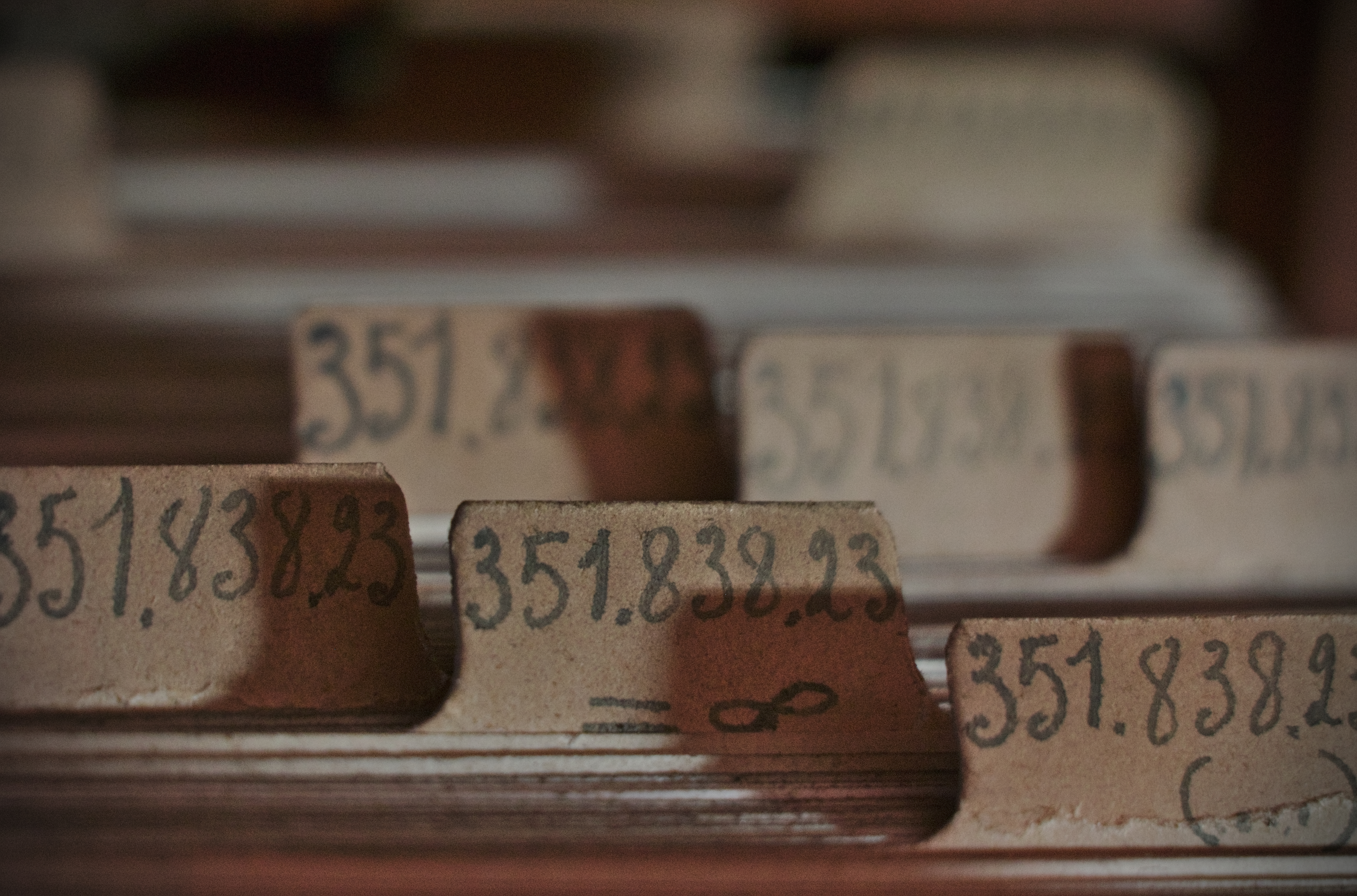
Universal decimal classification used at the library of the maison Losseau

The Universal Decimal Classification (UDC) is a bibliographic and library classification representing the systematic arrangement of all branches of human knowledge organized as a coherent system in which knowledge fields are related and inter-linked. The UDC is a faceted classification system featuring detailed vocabulary and syntax that enables powerful content indexing and information retrieval in large collections. Since 1991, the UDC has been owned and managed by the UDC Consortium, a non-profit international association of publishers with headquarters in The Hague, Netherlands.

Unlike other library classification schemes that started their life as national systems, the UDC was conceived and maintained as an international scheme. Its translation into other languages started at the beginning of the 20th century and has since been published in various printed editions in over 40 languages. UDC Summary, an abridged Web version of the scheme, is available in over 50 languages. The classification has been modified and extended over the years to cope with increasing output in all areas of human knowledge, and is still under continuous review to take account of new developments.

Albeit originally designed as an indexing and retrieval system, due to its logical structure and scalability, UDC has become one of the most widely used knowledge organization systems in libraries, where it is used for either shelf arrangement, content indexing or both. UDC codes can describe any type of document or object to any desired level of detail. These can include textual documents and other media such as films, video and sound recordings, illustrations, maps as well as realia such as museum objects.

== History ==
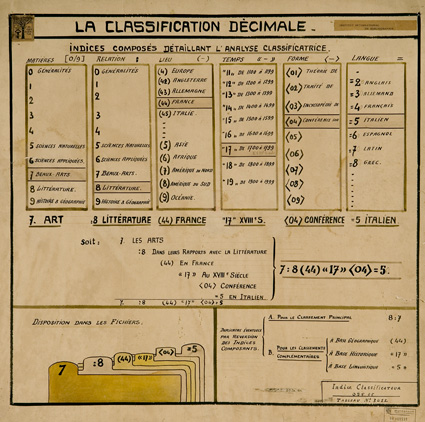
An explanatory schema of the Universal Decimal Classification index formation in French, 1920

The UDC was developed by the Belgian bibliographers Paul Otlet and Henri La Fontaine at the end of the 19th century. In 1895, they created the Universal Bibliographic Repertory (Répertoire Bibliographique Universel) (RBU) which was intended to become a comprehensive classified index to all published information. The idea that the RBU should take the form of a card catalogue came from the young American zoologist Herbert Haviland Field, who was at the time himself setting up a bibliographical agency in Zurich, the Concilium Bibliographicum. A means of arranging the entries would be needed, and Otlet, having heard of the Dewey Decimal Classification, wrote to Melvil Dewey and obtained permission to translate it into French. The idea outgrew the plan of mere translation, and a number of radical innovations were made, adapting the purely enumerative classification (in which all the subjects envisaged are already listed and coded) into one which allows for synthesis (that is, the construction of compound numbers to denote interrelated subjects that could never be exhaustively foreseen); various possible relations between subjects were identified, and symbols assigned to represent them. In its first edition in French, Manuel du Répertoire bibliographique universel (1905), the UDC already included many features that were revolutionary in the context of knowledge classifications: tables of generally applicable (aspect-free) concepts—called common auxiliary tables; a series of special auxiliary tables with specific but re-usable attributes in a particular field of knowledge; an expressive notational system with connecting symbols and syntax rules to enable coordination of subjects and the creation of a documentation language proper.

Otlet asked Dewey to incorporate their revised numbers and punctuation methodology. They refused, citing the complexity and costs of change: the Dewey system was meant to be cheap and easy to implement, the UDC was seen as too complex.

The UDC and the Dewey systems were now split, and Otlet greatly regretted the divergence from his “universal” classification.

The Universal Bibliographic Repertory grew to more than eleven million records in the period before World War I. The catalogue and its content organized by UDC can still be seen in Mundaneum in Mons, Belgium. In 2013 this catalogue was accepted onto the UNESCO Memory of the World international register, recognising it as documentary heritage of global importance.

== Application ==
UDC is used in around 150,000 libraries in 130 countries and in many bibliographical services which require detailed content indexing. In a number of countries it is the main classification system for information exchange and is used in all types of libraries: public, school, academic and special libraries.

UDC is also used in national bibliographies of around 30 countries. Examples of large databases indexed by UDC include:

- NEBIS (The Network of Libraries and Information Centers in Switzerland) — 2.6 million records
- COBIB.SI (Slovenian National Union Catalogue) — 3.5 million records
- Hungarian National Union Catalogue (MOKKA) — 2.9 million records
- VINITI RAS database (All-Russian Scientific and Technical Information Institute of Russian Academy of Science) with 28 million records
- Meteorological & Geoastrophysical Abstracts (MGA) with 600 journal titles
- PORBASE (Portuguese National Bibliography) with 1.5 million records

UDC has traditionally been used for the indexing of scientific articles which was an important source of information of scientific output in the period predating electronic publishing. Collections of research articles in many countries covering decades of scientific output contain UDC codes. Examples of journal articles indexed by UDC:

- UDC code 663.12:57.06 in the article "Yeast Systematics: from Phenotype to Genotype" in the journal Food Technology and Biotechnology (ISSN 1330-9862)
- UDC code 37.037:796.56, provided in the article "The game method as means of interface of technical-tactical and psychological preparation in sports orienteering" in the Russian journal "Pedagogico-psychological and medico-biological problems of the physical culture and sport" (ISSN 2070-4798).
- UDC code 621.715:621.924:539.3 in the article Residual Stress in Shot-Peened Sheets of AIMg4.5Mn Alloy - in the journal Materials and technology (ISSN 1580-2949).

The design of UDC lends itself to machine readability, and the system has been used both with early automatic mechanical sorting devices, and modern library OPACs. Since 1993, a standard version of UDC has been maintained and distributed in a database format: UDC Master Reference File (UDC MRF) which is updated and released regularly. The 2011 version of the MRF (released in 2012) contains over 70,000 classes. In the past full printed editions used to have around 220,000 subdivisions.

== Structure ==
=== Notation ===
A notation is a code commonly used in classification schemes to represent a class, i.e. a subject and its position in the hierarchy, to enable mechanical sorting and filing of subjects. UDC uses Arabic numerals arranged decimally. Every number is thought of as a decimal fraction with the initial decimal point omitted, which determines the filing order. An advantage of decimal notational systems is that they are infinitely extensible, and when new subdivisions are introduced, they need not disturb the existing allocation of numbers. For ease of reading, a UDC notation is usually punctuated after every third digit:

Notation	Caption (Class description)
539.120	Theoretical problems of elementary particles physics. Theories and models of fundamental interactions
539.120.2	Symmetries of quantum physics
539.120.22	Conservation laws
539.120.222	Translations. Rotations
539.120.224	Reflection in time and space
539.120.226	Space-time symmetries
539.120.23	Internal symmetries
539.120.3	Currents
539.120.4	Unified field theories
539.120.5	Strings

In UDC the notation has two features that make the scheme easier to browse and work with:

- hierarchically expressive – the longer the notation, the more specific the class: removing the final digit automatically produces a broader class code.
- syntactically expressive – when UDC codes are combined, the sequence of digits is interrupted by a precise type of punctuation sign which indicates that the expression is a combination of classes rather than a simple class. For example, the colon in 34:32 indicates that there are two distinct notational elements: 34 Law. Jurisprudence and 32 Politics. In the following code 913(574.22)"19"(084.3), the parentheses and quotes indicate four separate notational elements: 913 Regional geography, (574.22) North Kazakhstan, "19" 20th century and (084.3) Maps (document form).

=== Basic features and syntax ===
UDC is a faceted classification. It allows an unlimited combination of attributes of a subject and relationships between subjects to be expressed. UDC codes from different tables can be combined to present various aspects of document content and form, e.g. 94(410)"19"(075) History (main subject) of United Kingdom (place) in 20th century (time), a textbook (document form). Or: 37:2 Relationship between Education and Religion. Complex UDC expressions can be accurately parsed into constituent elements.

UDC is also a disciplinary classification covering the entire universe of knowledge. This type of classification can also be described as aspect or perspective, which means that concepts are subsumed and placed under the field in which they are studied. Thus, the same concept can appear in different fields of knowledge. This particular feature is usually implemented in UDC by re-using the same concept in various combinations with the main subject, e.g. a code for language in common auxiliaries of language is used to derive numbers for ethnic grouping, individual languages in linguistics and individual literatures. Or, a code from the auxiliaries of place, e.g. (410) United Kingdom, uniquely representing the concept of United Kingdom can be used to express 911(410) Regional geography of United Kingdom and 94(410) History of United Kingdom.

=== Organization ===
Concepts are organized in two kinds of tables:

- Common auxiliary tables (including certain auxiliary signs). These tables contain facets of concepts representing general recurrent characteristics, applicable over a range of subjects throughout the main tables, including notions such as place, language of the text and physical form of the document, which may occur in almost any subject. UDC numbers from these tables, called common auxiliaries are simply added at the end of the number for the subject taken from the main tables. There are over 15,000 common auxiliaries in UDC.
- The main tables or main schedules containing the various disciplines and branches of knowledge are arranged in 9 main classes, numbered from 0 to 9 (with class 4 being vacant). At the beginning of each class there are also series of special auxiliaries, which express aspects that are recurrent within this specific class. Main tables in UDC contain more than 60,000 subdivisions.

==== Main classes ====
- 0 Science and Knowledge. Organization. Computer Science. Information Science. Documentation. Librarianship. Institutions. Publications
- 1 Philosophy. Psychology
- 2 Religion. Theology
- 3 Social Sciences
- 4 vacant
- 5 Mathematics. Natural Sciences
- 6 Applied Sciences. Medicine, Technology
- 7 The Arts. Entertainment. Sport
- 8 Linguistics. Literature
- 9 Geography. History

The vacant class 4 is the result of a planned schedule expansion. This class was freed by moving linguistics into class 8 in the 1960s to make space for future developments in the rapidly expanding fields of knowledge; primarily natural sciences and technology.

==== Common auxiliary tables ====
Common auxiliaries are aspect-free concepts that can be used in combination with any other UDC code from the main classes or with other common auxiliaries. They have unique notational representations that make them stand out in complex expressions. Common auxiliary numbers always begin with a certain symbol known as a facet indicator. For example, an equals sign always indicates a language; numbers starting with zero and enclosed in parentheses always indicate a document form. Thus (075) Textbook and =111 English can be combined to express, for example, (075)=111 Textbooks in English. When combined with numbers from the main UDC tables one might get: 2(075)=111 Religion textbooks in English or 51(075)=111 Mathematics textbooks in English.

Indicator	Table	Concepts
=...	1c	Language
(0...)	1d	Form
(1/9)	1e	Place
(=...)	1f	Human ancestry, ethnic grouping and nationality
"..."	1g	Time
-02	1k	Properties
-03	1k	Materials
-04	1k	Relations, processes and operations
-05	1k	Persons and personal characteristics

==== Connecting signs ====
In order to preserve the precise meaning and enable accurate parsing of complex UDC expressions, a number of connecting symbols are made available to relate and extend UDC numbers. These are:

Symbol	Symbol name	Meaning	Example
+	plus	coordination, addition	59+636 zoology and animal breeding
/	stroke	consecutive extension	592/599 Systematic zoology (everything from 592 to 599 inclusive)
:	colon	relation	17:7 Relation of ethics to art
[ ]	square brackets	subgrouping	311:[622+669](485) statistics of mining and metallurgy in Sweden (the auxiliary qualifiers 622+669 are considered as a unit)
*	asterisk	Introduces non-UDC notation	523.4*433 Planetology, minor planet Eros (IAU authorized number after the asterisk)
A/Z	alphabetical extension	Direct alphabetical specification	821.133.1MOL French literature, works of Molière

== Outline ==
UDC classes in this outline are taken from the Multilingual Universal Decimal Classification Summary (UDCC Publication No. 088) released by the UDC Consortium under the Creative Commons Attribution Share Alike 3.0 license (first release 2009, subsequent update 2012).

=== Main tables ===
==== 0 Science and knowledge. Organization. Computer science. Information. Documentation. Librarianship. Institution. Publications ====
Class	Description
00	Prolegomena. Fundamentals of knowledge and culture. Propaedeutics
001	Science and knowledge in general. Organization of intellectual work
002	Documentation. Books. Writings. Authorship
003	Writing systems and scripts
004	Computer science and technology. Computing
004.2	Computer architecture
004.3	Computer hardware
004.4	Software
004.5	Human-computer interaction
004.6	Data
004.7	Computer communication
004.8	Artificial intelligence
004.9	Application-oriented computer-based techniques
005	Management
005.1	Management Theory
005.2	Management agents. Mechanisms. Measures
005.3	Management activities
005.5	Management operations. Direction
005.6	Quality management. Total quality management (TQM)
005.7	Organizational management (OM)
005.9	Fields of management
005.92	Records management
005.93	Plant management. Physical resources management
005.94	Knowledge management
005.95/.96	Personnel management. Human Resources management
006	Standardization of products, operations, weights, measures and time
007	Activity and organizing. Information. Communication and control theory generally (cybernetics)
008	Civilization. Culture. Progress
01	Bibliography and bibliographies. Catalogues
02	Librarianship
030	General reference works (as subject)
050	Serial publications, periodicals (as subject)
06	Organizations of a general nature
069	Museums
070	Newspapers (as subject). The Press. Outline of journalism
08	Polygraphies. Collective works (as subject)
09	Manuscripts. Rare and remarkable works (as subject)

==== 1 Philosophy. Psychology ====
Class	Description
101	Nature and role of philosophy
11	Metaphysics
111	General metaphysics. Ontology
122/129	Special Metaphysics
13	Philosophy of mind and spirit. Metaphysics of spiritual life
14	Philosophical systems and points of view
141	Kinds of viewpoint. Including: Monism. Dualism. Pluralism. Ontological Materialism. Metaphysical Idealism. Platonism, etc.
159.9	Psychology
159.91	Psychophysiology (physiological psychology). Mental physiology
159.92	Mental development and capacity. Comparative psychology
159.93	Sensation. Sensory perception
159.94	Executive functions
159.95	Higher mental processes
159.96	Special mental states and processes
159.97	Abnormal psychology
159.98	Applied psychology (psychotechnology) in general
16	Logic. Epistemology. Theory of knowledge. Methodology of logic
17	Moral philosophy. Ethics. Practical philosophy

==== 2 Religion. Theology ====
The UDC tables for religion are fully faceted. The second table below lists special auxiliary numbers that can be used to express attributes (facets) of any specific faith. Any special number can be combined with any religion e.g. -5 Worship can be used to express, for example, 26-5 Worship in Judaism, 27-5 Worship in Christianity, or 24-5 Worship in Buddhism. The complete special auxiliary tables contain around 2000 subdivisions of various attributes that can be attached to express various aspects of individual faiths to a great level of specificity allowing equal level of detail for every religion.

Main Table
Class	Description
21/29	Religious systems. Religions and faiths
21	Prehistoric and primitive religions
22	Religions originating in the Far East
23	Religions originating in Indian sub-continent. Hindu religion in the broad sense
24	Buddhism
25	Religions of antiquity. Minor cults and religions
26	Judaism
27	Christianity
28	Islam
29	Modern spiritual movements

2-1/-9 Special auxiliary subdivision for religion
Class	Description
2-1	Theory and philosophy of religion. Nature of religion. Phenomenon of religion
2-2	Evidences of religion
2-3	Persons in religion
2-4	Religious activities. Religious practice
2-5	Worship broadly. Cult. Rites and ceremonies
2-6	Processes in religion
2-7	Religious organization and administration
2-8	Religions characterised by various properties
2-9	History of the faith, religion, denomination or church

==== 3 Social sciences ====
Class	Description
303	Methods of the social sciences
304	Social questions. Social practice. Cultural practice. Way of life (Lebensweise)
305	Gender studies
308	Sociography. Descriptive studies of society (both qualitative and quantitative)
311	Statistics as a science. Statistical theory
314/316	Society
314	Demography. Population studies
316	Sociology
32	Politics
33	Economics. Economic science
34	Law. Jurisprudence
35	Public administration. Government. Military affairs
36	Safeguarding the mental and material necessities of life
37	Education
39	Cultural anthropology. Ethnography. Customs. Manners. Traditions. Way of life

==== 4 Currently Vacant ====
This section is currently vacant.

==== 5 Mathematics. Natural sciences ====
Class	Description
502/504	Environmental science. Conservation of natural resources. Threats to the environment and protection against them
502	The environment and its protection
504	Threats to the environment
51	Mathematics
510	Fundamental and general considerations of mathematics
511	Number theory
512	Algebra
514	Geometry
517	Analysis
519.1	Combinatorial analysis. Graph theory
519.2	Probability. Mathematical statistics
519.6	Computational mathematics. Numerical analysis
519.7	Mathematical cybernetics
519.8	Operational research (OR): mathematical theories and methods
52	Astronomy. Astrophysics. Space research. Geodesy
53	Physics
531/534	Mechanics
535	Optics
536	Heat. Thermodynamics. Statistical physics
537	Electricity. Magnetism. Electromagnetism
538.9	Condensed matter physics. Solid state physics
539	Physical nature of matter
54	Chemistry. Crystallography. Mineralogy
542	Practical laboratory chemistry. Preparative and experimental chemistry
543	Analytical chemistry
544	Physical chemistry
546	Inorganic chemistry
547	Organic chemistry
548/549	Mineralogical sciences. Crystallography. Mineralogy
55	Earth sciences. Geological sciences
56	Paleontology
57	Biological sciences in general
58	Botany
59	Zoology

==== 6 Applied sciences. Medicine. Technology ====
Class 6 occupies the largest proportion of UDC schedules. It contains over 44,000 subdivisions. Each specific field of technology or industry usually contains more than one special auxiliary table with concepts needed to express operations, processes, materials and products. As a result, UDC codes are often created through the combination of various attributes. Equally, some parts of this class enumerate concepts to a great level of detail, for example, 621.882.212 Hexagon screws with additional shapes. Including: Flank screws. Collar screws. Cap screws

Class	Description
60	Biotechnology
61	Medical sciences
611/612	Human biology
613	Hygiene generally. Personal health and hygiene
614	Public health and hygiene. Accident prevention
615	Pharmacology. Therapeutics. Toxicology
616	Pathology. Clinical medicine
617	Surgery. Orthopaedics. Ophthalmology
618	Gynaecology. Obstetrics
62	Engineering. Technology in general
620	Materials testing. Commercial materials. Power stations. Economics of energy
621	Mechanical engineering in general. Nuclear technology. Electrical engineering. Machinery
622	Mining
623	Military engineering
624	Civil and structural engineering in general
625	Civil engineering of land transport. Railway engineering. Highway engineering
626/627	Hydraulic engineering and construction. Water (aquatic) structures
629	Transport vehicle engineering
63	Agriculture and related sciences and techniques. Forestry. Farming. Wildlife exploitation
630	Forestry
631/635	Farm management. Agronomy. Horticulture
633/635	Horticulture in general. Specific crops
636	Animal husbandry and breeding in general. Livestock rearing. Breeding of domestic animals
64	Home economics. Domestic science. Housekeeping
65	Communication and transport industries. Accountancy. Business management. Public relations
654	Telecommunication and telecontrol (organization, services)
655	Graphic industries. Printing. Publishing. Book trade
656	Transport and postal services. Traffic organization and control
657	Accountancy
658	Business management, administration. Commercial organization
659	Publicity. Information work. Public relations
66	Chemical technology. Chemical and related industries
67	Various industries, trades and crafts
68	Industries, crafts and trades for finished or assembled articles
69	Building (construction) trade. Building materials. Building practice and procedure

==== 7 The arts. Recreation. Entertainment. Sport ====
Main Table
Class	Description
71	Physical planning. Regional, town and country planning. Landscapes, parks, gardens
72	Architecture
73	Plastic arts
74	Drawing. Design. Applied arts and crafts
745/749	Industrial and domestic arts and crafts. Applied arts
75	Painting
76	Graphic art, printmaking. Graphics
77	Photography and similar processes
78	Music
79	Recreation. Entertainment. Games. Sport
791	Cinema. Films (motion pictures)
792	Theatre. Stagecraft. Dramatic performances
793	Social entertainments and recreations. Art of movement. Dance
794	Board and table games (of thought, skill and chance)
796	Sport. Games. Physical exercises
797	Water sports. Aerial sports
798	Riding and driving. Horse and other animal sports
799	Sport fishing. Sport hunting. Shooting and target sports

7.01/.09 Special auxiliary subdivision for the arts
Class	Description
7.01	Theory and philosophy of art. Principles of design, proportion, optical effect
7.02	Art technique. Craftsmanship
7.03	Artistic periods and phases. Schools, styles, influences
7.04	Subjects for artistic representation. Iconography. Iconology
7.05	Applications of art (in industry, trade, the home, everyday life)
7.06	Various questions concerning art
7.07	Occupations and activities associated with the arts and entertainment
7.08	Characteristic features, forms, combinations etc. (in art, entertainment and sport)
7.091	Performance, presentation (in original medium)

==== 8 Language. Linguistics. Literature ====
Tables for class 8 are fully faceted and details are expressed through combination with common auxiliaries of language (Table 1c) and a series of special auxiliary tables to indicate other facets or attributes in Linguistics or Literature. As a result, this class allows for great specificity in indexing although the schedules themselves occupy very little space in UDC. The subdivisions of 811 Languages or 821 Literature, for example, are derived from common auxiliaries of language =1/=9 (Table 1c) by substituting a point for the equals sign. Thus 811.111 English language (as a subject of a linguistic study) and 821.111 English literature derive from =111 English language. Common auxiliaries of place and time are also frequently used in this class to express place and time facets of Linguistics or Literature, e.g. 821.111(71)"18" English literature of Canada in the 19th century.

Main Table
Class	Description
80	General questions relating to both linguistics and literature. Philology
801	Prosody. Auxiliary sciences and sources of philology
808	Rhetoric. The effective use of language
81	Linguistics and languages
811	Languages Derived from the common auxiliaries of language =1/=9 (Table 1c) by replacing the equals sign = with prefix 811.. E.g. =111 English becomes 811.111 Linguistics of English language.
811.1/.9	All languages natural or artificial
811.1/.8	Individual natural languages
811.1/.2	Indo-European languages
811.21/.22	Indo-Iranian languages
811.3	Dead languages of unknown affiliation. Caucasian languages
811.4	Afro-Asiatic, Nilo-Saharan, Congo-Kordofanian, Khoisan languages
811.5	Ural-Altaic, Palaeo-Siberian, Eskimo-Aleut, Dravidian and Sino-Tibetan languages. Japanese. Korean. Ainu
811.6	Austro-Asiatic languages. Austronesian languages
811.7	Indo-Pacific (non-Austronesian) languages. Australian languages
811.8	American indigenous languages
811.9	Artificial languages
82	Literature
821	Literatures of individual languages and language families Derived from the common auxiliaries of language =1/=9 (Table 1c) by replacing the equals sign = with prefix 821.. E.g. =111 English becomes 821.111 English literature.

81`1/`4 Special auxiliary subdivision for linguistics and languages
Class	Description
81`1	General linguistics
81`2	Theory of signs. Theory of translation. Standardization. Usage. Geographical linguistics
81`3	Mathematical and applied linguistics. Phonetics. Graphemics. Grammar. Semantics. Stylistics
81`4	Text linguistics, Discourse analysis. Typological linguistics
81`42	Text linguistics. Discourse analysis
81`44	Typological linguistics

82-1/-9 Special auxiliary subdivision for literary forms, genres
Class	Description
82-1	Poetry. Poems. Verse
82-2	Drama. Plays
82-3	Fiction. Prose narrative
82-31	Novels. Full-length stories
82-32	Short stories. Novellas
82-4	Essays
82-5	Oratory. Speeches
82-6	Letters. Art of letter-writing. Correspondence. Genuine letters
82-7	Prose satire. Humour, epigram, parody
82-8	Miscellanea. Polygraphies. Selections
82-9	Various other literary forms
82-92	Periodical literature. Writings in serials, journals, reviews
82-94	History as literary genre. Historical writing. Historiography. Chronicles. Annals. Memoirs

82.02/.09 Special auxiliary subdivision for theory, study and technique of literature
Class	Description
82.02	Literary schools, trends and movements
82.09	Literary criticism. Literary studies
82.091	Comparative literary studies. Comparative literature

==== 9 Geography. Biography. History ====
Tables for Geography and History in UDC are fully faceted and place, time and ethnic grouping facets are expressed through combination with common auxiliaries of place (Table 1e), ethnic grouping (Table 1f) and time (Table 1g)

Class	Description
902/908	Archaeology. Prehistory. Cultural remains. Area studies
902	Archaeology
903	Prehistory. Prehistoric remains, artifacts, antiquities
904	Cultural remains of historical times
908	Area studies. Study of a locality
91	Geography. Exploration of the Earth and of individual countries. Travel. Regional geography
910	General questions. Geography as a science. Exploration. Travel
911	General geography. Science of geographical factors (systematic geography). Theoretical geography
911.2	Physical geography
911.3	Human geography (cultural geography). Geography of cultural factors
911.5/.9	Theoretical geography
912	Nonliterary, nontextual representations of a region
913	Regional geography
92	Biographical studies. Genealogy. Heraldry. Flags
929	Biographical studies
929.5	Genealogy
929.6	Heraldry
929.7	Nobility. Titles. Peerage
929.9	Flags. Standards. Banners
93/94	History
930	Science of history. Historiography
930.1	History as a science
930.2	Methodology of history. Ancillary historical sciences
930.25	Archivistics. Archives (including public and other records)
930.85	History of civilization. Cultural history
94	General

=== Common auxiliary tables ===
==== Table 1c: Language ====
Class	Description
=1/=9	Languages (natural and artificial)
=1/=8	Natural languages
=1/=2	Indo-European languages
=1	Indo-European languages of Europe
=11	Germanic languages
=12	Italic languages
=13	Romance languages
=14	Greek (Hellenic)
=15	Celtic languages
=16	Slavic languages
=17	Baltic languages
=18	Albanian
=19	Armenian
=2	Indo-Iranian, Nuristani (Kafiri) and dead Indo-European languages
=21/=22	Indo-Iranian languages
=21	Indic languages
=22	Iranian languages
=29	Dead Indo-European languages (not listed elsewhere)
=3	Dead languages of unknown affiliation. Caucasian languages
=34	Dead languages of unknown affiliation, spoken in the Mediterranean and Near East (except Semitic)
=35	Caucasian languages
=4	Afro-Asiatic, Nilo-Saharan, Congo-Kordofanian, Khoisan languages
=41	Afro-Asiatic (Hamito-Semitic) languages
=42	Nilo-Saharan languages
=43	Congo-Kordofanian (Niger-Kordofanian) languages
=45	Khoisan languages
=5	Ural-Altaic, Palaeo-Siberian, Eskimo-Aleut, Dravidian and Sino-Tibetan languages. Japanese. Korean. Ainu
=51	Ural-Altaic languages
=521	Japanese
=531	Korean
=541	Ainu
=55	Palaeo-Siberian languages
=56	Eskimo-Aleut languages
=58	Sino-Tibetan languages
=6	Austro-Asiatic languages. Austronesian languages
=61	Austro-Asiatic languages
=62	Austronesian languages
=7	Indo-Pacific (non-Austronesian) languages. Australian languages
=71	Indo-Pacific (non-Austronesian) languages
=72	Australian languages
=8	American indigenous languages
=81	Indigenous languages of Canada, USA and Northern-Central Mexico
=82	Indigenous languages of western North American Coast, Mexico and Yucatán
=84/=88	Central and South American indigenous languages
=84	Ge-Pano-Carib languages. Macro-Chibchan languages
=85	Andean languages. Equatorial languages
=86	Chaco languages. Patagonian and Fuegian languages
=88	Isolated, unclassified Central and South American indigenous languages
=9	Artificial languages
=92	Artificial languages for use among human beings. International auxiliary languages (interlanguages)
=93	Artificial languages used to instruct machines. Programming languages. Computer languages

==== Table 1d: Form ====
Main Table
Class	Description
(01)	Bibliographies
(02)	Books in general
(03)	Reference works
(04)	Non-serial separates. Separata
(041)	Pamphlets. Brochures
(042)	Addresses. Lectures. Speeches
(043)	Theses. Dissertations
(044)	Personal documents. Correspondence. Letters. Circulars
(045)	Articles in serials, collections etc. Contributions
(046)	Newspaper articles
(047)	Reports. Notices. Bulletins
(048)	Bibliographic descriptions. Abstracts. Summaries. Surveys
(049)	Other non-serial separates
(05)	Serial publications. Periodicals
(06)	Documents relating to societies, associations, organizations
(07)	Documents for instruction, teaching, study, training
(08)	Collected and polygraphic works. Forms. Lists. Illustrations. Business publications
(09)	Presentation in historical form. Legal and historical sources
(091)	Presentation in chronological, historical form. Historical presentation in the strict sense
(092)	Biographical presentation
(093)	Historical sources
(094)	Legal sources. Legal documents

(0.02/.08) Special auxiliary subdivision for document form
Class	Description
(0.02)	Documents according to physical, external form
(0.03)	Documents according to method of production
(0.032)	Handwritten documents (autograph, holograph copies). Manuscripts. Pictorial documents (drawings, paintings)
(0.034)	Machine-readable documents
(0.04)	Documents according to stage of production
(0.05)	Documents for particular kinds of user
(0.06)	Documents according to level of presentation and availability
(0.07)	Supplementary matter issued with a document
(0.08)	Separately issued supplements or parts of documents

==== Table 1e: Place ====
Main Table
Class	Description
(1)	Place and space in general. Localization. Orientation
(100)	Universal as to place. International. All countries in general
(2)	Physiographic designation
(20)	Ecosphere
(21)	Surface of the Earth in general. Land areas in particular. Natural zones and regions
(23)	Above sea level. Surface relief. Above ground generally. Mountains
(24)	Below sea level. Underground. Subterranean
(25)	Natural flat ground (at, above or below sea level). The ground in its natural condition, cultivated or inhabited
(26)	Oceans, seas and interconnections
(28)	Inland waters
(29)	The world according to physiographic features
(3)	Places of the ancient and mediaeval world
(31)	Ancient China and Japan
(32)	Ancient Egypt
(33)	Ancient Roman Province of Judaea. The Holy Land. Region of the Israelites
(34)	Ancient India
(35)	Medo-Persia
(36)	Regions of the so-called barbarians
(37)	Italia. Ancient Rome and Italy
(38)	Ancient Greece
(399)	Other regions. Ancient geographical divisions other than those of classical antiquity
(4/9)	Countries and places of the modern world
(4)	Europe
(5)	Asia
(6)	Africa
(7)	North and Central America
(8)	South America
(9)	States and regions of the South Pacific and Australia. Arctic. Antarctic

(1-0/-9) Special auxiliary subdivision for boundaries and spatial forms of various kinds
Class	Description
(1-0)	Zones
(1-1)	Orientation. Points of the compass. Relative position
(1-11)	East. Eastern
(1-13)	South. Southern
(1-14)	South-west. South-western
(1-15)	West. Western
(1-17)	North. Northern
(1-19)	Relative location, direction and orientation
(1-2)	Lowest administrative units. Localities
(1-5)	Dependent or semi-dependent territories
(1-6)	States or groupings of states from various points of view
(1-7)	Places and areas according to privacy, publicness and other special features
(1-8)	Location. Source. Transit. Destination
(1-9)	Regionalization according to specialized points of view

==== Table 1f: Human ancestry and grouping ====
They are derived mainly from the common auxiliaries of language =... (Table 1c) and so may also usefully distinguish linguistic-cultural groups. For example =111 English is used to represent (=111) English speaking peoples.

Class	Description
(=01)	Human ancestry groups
(=011)	European Continental Ancestry Group
(=012)	Asian Continental Ancestry Group
(=013)	African Continental Ancestry Group
(=014)	Oceanic Ancestry Group
(=017)	American Native Continental Ancestry Group
(=1/=8)	Linguistic-cultural groups, ethnic groups, peoples [derived from Table 1c]
(=1:1/9)	Peoples associated with particular places E.g. (=111:71) Anglophone population of Canada

==== Table 1g: Time ====
Class	Description
"0/2"	Dates and ranges of time (CE or AD) in conventional Christian (Gregorian) reckoning
"0"	First millennium CE
"1"	Second millennium CE
"2"	Third millennium CE
"3/7"	Time divisions other than dates in Christian (Gregorian) reckoning
"3"	Conventional time divisions and subdivisions: numbered, named, etc.
"4"	Duration. Time-span. Period. Term. Ages and age-groups
"5"	Periodicity. Frequency. Recurrence at specified intervals.
"6"	Geological, archaeological and cultural time divisions
"61/62"	Geological time division
"63"	Archaeological, prehistoric, protohistoric periods and ages
"67/69"	Time reckonings: universal, secular, non-Christian religious
"67"	Universal time reckoning. Before Present
"68"	Secular time reckonings other than universal and the Christian (Gregorian) calendar
"69"	Dates and time units in non-Christian (non-Gregorian) religious time reckonings
"7"	Phenomena in time. Phenomenology of time

==== Table 1k: General characteristics ====
Class	Description
-02	Common auxiliaries of properties
-021	Properties of existence
-022	Properties of magnitude, degree, quantity, number, temporal values, dimension, size
-023	Properties of shape
-024	Properties of structure. Properties of position
-025	Properties of arrangement
-026	Properties of action and movement
-027	Operational properties
-028	Properties of style and presentation
-029	Properties derived from other main classes
-03	Common auxiliaries of materials
-032	Naturally occurring mineral materials
-033	Manufactured mineral-based materials
-034	Metals
-035	Materials of mainly organic origin
-036	Macromolecular materials. Rubbers and plastics
-037	Textiles. Fibres. Yarns. Fabrics. Cloth
-039	Other materials
-04	Common auxiliaries of relations, processes and operations
-042	Phase relations
-043	General processes
-043.8/.9	Processes of existence
-045	Processes related to position, arrangement, movement, physical properties, states of matter
-047/-049	General operations and activities
-05	Common auxiliaries of persons and personal characteristics
-051	Persons as agents, doers, practitioners (studying, making, serving etc.)
-052	Persons as targets, clients, users (studied, served etc.)
-053	Persons according to age or age-groups
-054	Persons according to ethnic characteristics, nationality, citizenship etc.
-055	Persons according to gender and kinship
-056	Persons according to constitution, health, disposition, hereditary or other traits
-057	Persons according to occupation, work, livelihood, education
-058	Persons according to social class, civil status

== See also ==
=== Classifications based on UDC ===
- BBC LonClass

=== Other faceted classifications ===
- Bliss bibliographic classification
- Colon classification

=== Other library classifications ===
- Dewey Decimal Classification
- Library of Congress Classification
- Chinese Library Classification
- Harvard-Yenching Classification
- Brian Deer Classification System
