= Concilium Bibliographicum =

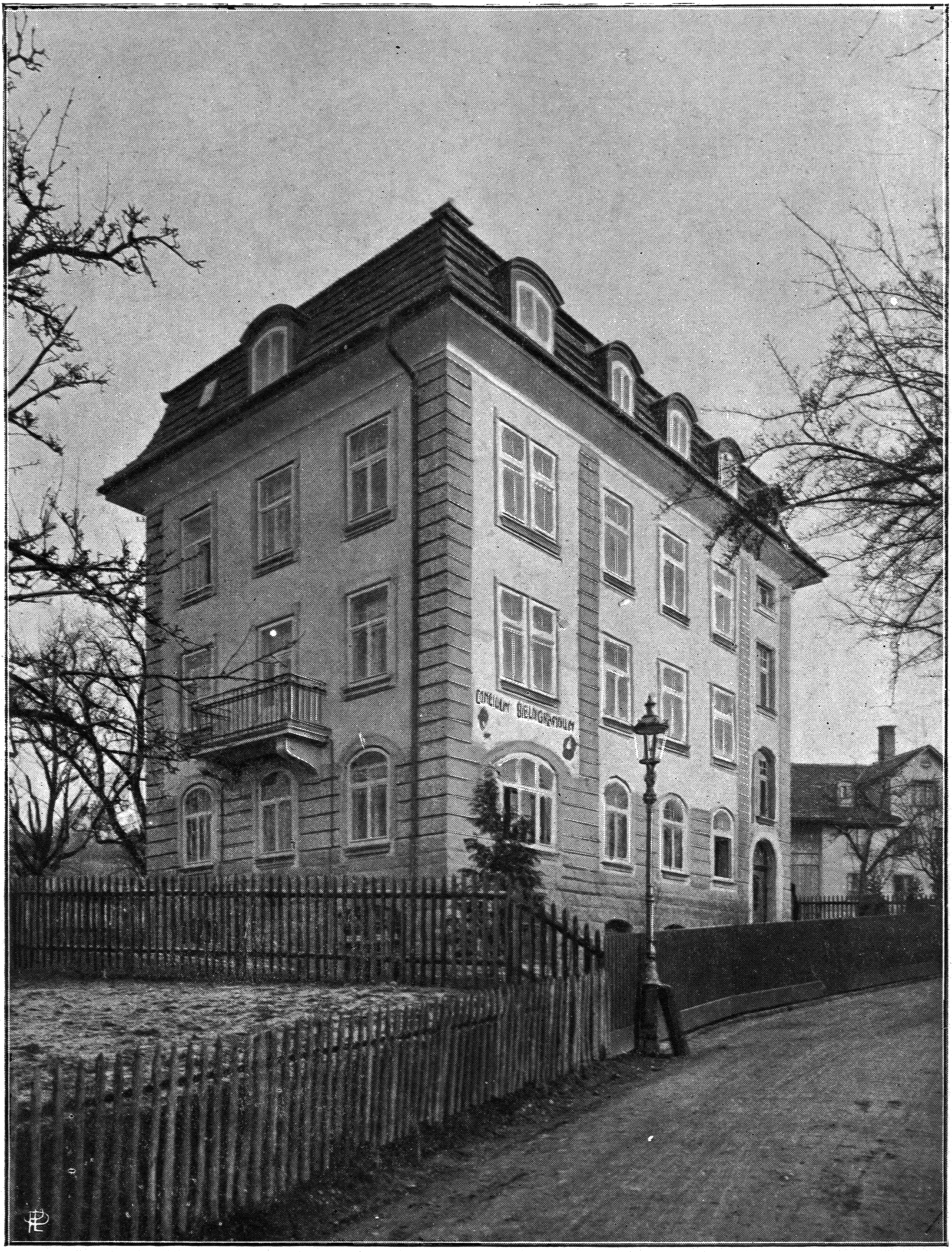
Building for the Concilium in Zurich, 1908

The Concilium Bibliographicum was established in Zurich, Switzerland, in 1895 by the U.S. zoologist Herbert Haviland Field in response to the lack of timely and complete bibliographies to serve the new sciences that had begun to emerge in the late nineteenth century. Initially using his own funds, Field assumed the task of surveying all science journals and to use the then new index-cards and the highly sophisticated but complex Universal Decimal Classification system to send packets, bi-weekly, to his subscribers who were each to build a cumulative card file that would allow access to complete bibliographic citations and subject identifiers for all the literature on zoology and related fields from 1895 to the present.

Field cooperated with the grand information efforts of Belgians Paul Otlet and Henri La Fontaine who had founded the Institut International de Bibliographie (IIB) in Brussels in 1895, later renamed as (in English) the International Federation for Information and Documentation (FID). In its early years the Concilium operated as an affiliate of the IIB. Field is credited with persuading Otlet and La Fontaine to adopt the 75 x 125 mm card size. He was also responsible for developing at the Concilium the Zoology sections of the Universal Decimal Classification.

== Success and struggle ==
The Concilium and the IIB faced hostilities arising from nationalistic competition among England, France and Germany, but by 1903 the Concilium had sent some 13,000,000 cards to over 600 subscribers in Europe and North and South America.

It was, however, difficult to make the Concilium financially viable and just as it was on the verge of becoming self-sustaining the outbreak of war in 1914 forced it to suspend operations. After the war, as Herbert Field was overcoming objections to his system by applied scientists, such as those represented by the National Research Council (United States) who favored a simpler and less expensive system based on volunteers composing abstracts of articles (as in Biological Abstracts) and saw no need for 'old knowledge', and just as he was about to receive funding from America's Rockefeller Foundation, he died. The Concilium was left in the hands of Johannes Strohl, a rather stubborn European scientist who found himself in conflict with the foundation, with those who favored a new world science information system based on abstracts, and with his subscribers who objected to the increased prices he had to charge as well as to the unwieldy size of the Concilium files as the number of science publications increased.

== End ==
Already on its last legs, the outbreak of war in 1939 led to the closing of the Concilium in 1940. There were no attempts to revive it when peace returned.
