= Herbert Haviland Field =

American zoologist (1868–1921)

- Born: April 25, 1868; Brooklyn, New York, United States
- Died: April 5, 1921 (aged 52); Zurich, Switzerland
- Spouse: Nina Eschwege
- Children: Elsie Field Doob; Noel Field; Hermann Haviland Field; Letticia (Lette) Field
- Parents: Aaron M. Field (father); Lydia Seaman Haviland Field (mother)
- Relatives: Hamilton Easter Field (brother); Anna H. Field (sister, died age 7); Fannie (Fanny) E. Field Griffen (step-sister); Edward S. Field (step-brother); Henry C. Field (step-brother)

Herbert Haviland Field (April 25, 1868 – April 5, 1921) was an American zoologist who founded the Concilium Bibliographicum, a leading science information service in the early twentieth century and was the father of Noel Field and Hermann Field.

== Early life ==
Herbert Haviland Field was born to a rich and culturally and politically liberal Brooklyn Quaker family on April 25, 1868. A product of his merchant father’s second marriage, Herbert had two step-brothers and a step-sister, as well as a brother, the famed artist Hamilton Easter Field, and a sister who died when she was just seven, devastating her parents, Aaron and Lydia. Although Herbert was a sickly child he showed signs of brilliance early-on and seems to have had a photographic memory. He showed his intellectual gifts at Brooklyn Friends School, the city’s advanced Polytechnic Institute and, then, at Harvard University where he majored in zoology, one of the new fields of study that were defining modern science methods. He earned his Ph.D. in 1893 then traveled to Europe for further studies, travels financed by his parents and aided by his extended Quaker family that included the famous and influential Haviland chinaware-makers of France. While in Europe, Herbert became a significant figure in the emerging infrastructure of science and attended professional meetings throughout Europe and America where the deepening problems of science information were receiving attention because of lack of universal coverage of the literature and because of competition between France, England and Germany over which nation would control bibliographies for the sciences.

== The Concilium Bibliographicum ==
Herbert decided not to continue his zoological research but to focus on the information problem, which was the difficulty at the time of locating relevant articles on a topic published in the growing number of scientific journals. It was initially his intention to reorganize the bibliography of zoological materials using the method of classification developed by Melvil Dewey. His mother and, later, a legacy from his father allowed him to form and initially self-finance the Concilium Bibliographicum in Zurich, Switzerland in 1895 to provide a service that would survey all the literature in zoology and related fields and send his subscribers indexed and abstracted notices every two weeks. The system would be organized on cards and could be subscribed by individuals or libraries. Working in cooperation with Paul Otlet and Henri La Fontaine of Belgium, who were building a similar index-card based system using the Universal Decimal Classification (UDC) system for a much broader range of subjects. Herbert developed the UDC schedules for Zoology and is credited with persuading Otlet and La Fontaine to adopt standard 75 x 125 mm card size.

Herbert envisioned his subscribers building cumulative files covering all the years from 1895 to the present. Although unable to make his service financially self-sustaining, by the 1903 he had sent some 13,000,000 cards to over 600 subscribers. Through his information efforts, Herbert became known to scientific and political leaders throughout Europe and America.

Meanwhile, at age thirty-five, Herbert had married Nina Eschwege, a British woman of German descent. They soon had four children, two of whom, Noel Field and Hermann, became famous because of their connections to Communist espionage activity and for being kidnapped by Soviet intelligence in 1949 and held captive for some five years as they were used as sources for the bloody purges in the Soviet bloc.

== World War I ==
The outbreak of the war cut the Concilium Bibliographicum off from sources and customers and Herbert decided to spend the war working for the Quaker’s relief agency in Europe. He also worked as an intelligence asset for the United States under Allen Dulles who later headed the Central Intelligence Agency. After the war, Herbert did more intelligence work and aided the new League of Nations’ efforts to rebuild the world’s science information systems.

== Post War Efforts and death ==
After the war, Herbert tried to revive the Concilium Bibliographicum but found himself in a battle against scientists, represented by the National Research Council (United States), who wanted quick and inexpensive information systems based on abstracts done by volunteers rather than classifications by professionals. Then, just as the Concilium Bibliographicum was about to be funded by the Rockefeller Foundation, Herbert died, on April 4, 1921. His family returned to America and the Concilium Bibliographicum was turned over to Johannes Strohl who battled with the Rockefeller Foundation and his diminishing number of subscribers until the impact of World War II led to the termination of the Concilium Bibliographicum in 1940.

== See also ==
- Noel Field
- Concilium Bibliographicum
