= BBC Design & Engineering =

Defunct business division

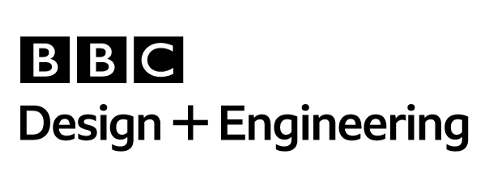
BBC Design+Engineering branding (2018 onwards)

BBC Design & Engineering (styled as BBC Design＋Engineering) was an operational business division of the BBC, which combined the BBC Digital, BBC Engineering and BBC Worldwide Technology divisions, responsible for all of the BBC's digital media services including BBC Online, BBC Red Button and BBC iPlayer, BBC mobile apps, internal technology services, technology procurement and BBC Research & Development. It was headed by the chief technology and product officer Matthew Postgate.

Since 2020, the division has been split into multiple smaller departments – Product Group, Technology Group, and Distribution & Business Development within the public service, and BBC Studios Product and Technology group within the commercial BBC Studios.

== History ==
=== BBC Online (1994) ===
The BBC has had an online presence supporting its TV and radio programmes and web-only initiatives since 1994 but did not launch officially until April 1997, following government approval to fund it by TV licence revenue as a service in its own right.

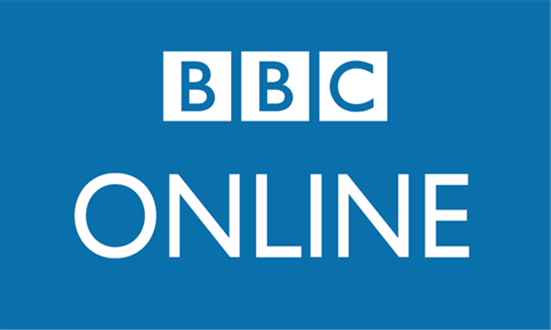
BBC Online logo

It is a large network of websites including such high-profile sites as: BBC News and Sport, the on-demand video and radio services co-branded BBC iPlayer, the pre-school site CBeebies, and learning services such as Bitesize. Throughout its short history, the online plans of the BBC have been subject to harassment from its commercial rivals. This resulted in various public consultations and government reviews to investigate their claims that its large presence and public funding distorts the UK market.

BBC Red Button launched in September 1999 as a branding for digital interactive television services provided by the BBC, and broadcast in the United Kingdom. The services replaced Ceefax, the BBC's analogue teletext service, and is only available via digital television receivers. The service can be accessed via Digital terrestrial television (DTT) (DVB-T), satellite television (DVB-S) and cable television (DVB-C). The "Red Button" branding is no longer used within the BBC own website.

=== BBC Technology Ltd sell off (2004) ===
In 2004, BBC Technology Ltd, a commercial subsidiary of the BBC who provided technology and broadcast support and services was sold to Siemens IT Solutions and Services (SIS) under a 10-year Technology Framework Contract (TFC) worth almost £2bn. Siemens was purchased by Atos Information Technology Incorporated in 2011 who continue to hold the contract. BBC Future Media & Technology continued as an internal division for managing this contract and other technology projects.

=== BBC iPlayer (2007) ===
BBC iPlayer was launched in 2007. This provides internet television and radio service and software application, developed by the BBC to extend its former RealPlayer-based and other streamed video clip content to include whole TV shows.

=== DMI (2008–2013) ===
The Digital Media Initiative (DMI) was broadcast engineering project launched by the BBC Technology division in 2008. It aimed to modernise the BBC's production and archiving methods by using connected digital production and media asset management systems. After a protracted development process lasting five years with a spend of £98 million between 2010 and 2012, the project was abandoned in May 2013.

=== BBC Future Media (2011) ===
The original Future Media & Technology division was divided as a part of a corporate restructure within the BBC in 2011. The idea for the division was conceived in 2011 to connect all areas of the BBC's digital viewing platforms.

The concept was to create a more streamlined business function that can respond more quickly to future developments in the industry. According to The Guardian, "The BBC's online presence now is like TV was in 1963. They still do not know what they are doing. It's about combining an understanding of technology, editorial and the BBC – and there's still not enough people in the business that understand all three." Some staff were moved from London and other locations to the new MediaCityUK development in Salford.

From 1 April 2015 BBC Future Media was renamed BBC Digital, while BBC Technology was renamed as BBC Engineering.

=== BBC Design & Engineering (2016) ===
BBC Design & Engineering was created in 2016 when Matthew Postgate was appointed chief technology officer for a new division that brought together the BBC Digital, Engineering and BBC Worldwide technology teams, thus re-amalgamating departments separated by previous internal restructures. From 2020, the division was demerged into multiple smaller departments – Product Group, Technology Group, and Distribution & Business Development within the Public Service arm, and BBC Studios Product and Technology group within the commercial BBC Studios entity.

Following a branding update, the division's name was stylised as BBC Design＋Engineering.

=== Technology Group and Product Group (2020) ===
Following Matthew Postgate's departure in late 2020, the BBC split D＋E into a parallel structure of Technology Group and Product Group as part of its Value for All strategy. Tech Group was responsible for all infrastructure, systems, networks, technology technology support and R&D. Product Group was responsible for audience-facing digital experiences like iPlayer, Sounds, News, Sport, Childrens and Bitesize.

Between 2021-2025, the Engineering Operations division was renamed to Technology Operations (Tech Ops), latterly Technology and Media Operations (TMO), to reflect the changing nature of its work. Subsequent organisation changes resulted in Technology Group incorporating the BBC's Media Ops operation and R&D functions during 2024.

=== BBC Technology Operations; Technology and Media Operations (2024) ===
During the Technology Group era, the Technology and Media Operations division grew to encompass systems and engineering support (Tech Ops) and production operations (Media Ops) areas of the organisation. The TMO division was aligned to Technology Group, in contrast to Product Group's audience-facing responsibilities.

=== BBC Media Tech (2026) ===
Following a major restructure of the BBC's technology divisions, the old Product and Technology group structures were effectively reunified along with R&D and Media Operations colleagues under the BBC Media Tech division in March 2026. Notably, the creation of Media Tech brought together employees from Public Service and the BBC's commercial Studios division. Storm Fagan was appointed as Chief Technology and Product Officer.

== Subsidiary departments ==
- BBC Research & Development

== See also ==
- BBC
- BBC Research & Development
- Internet television
- Web television
- Video on demand
