= NICAM =

Digital audio compression standard

Near Instantaneous Companded Audio Multiplex (NICAM) is an early form of lossy compression for digital audio. It was originally developed in the early 1970s for point-to-point links within broadcasting networks. In the 1980s, broadcasters began to use NICAM compression for transmissions of stereo TV sound to the public.

== History ==
=== Near-instantaneous companding ===
The idea was first described in 1964. In this, the 'ranging' was to be applied to the analogue signal before the analogue-to-digital converter (ADC) and after the digital-to-analogue converter (DAC). The application of this to broadcasting, in which the companding was to be done entirely digitally after the ADC and before the DAC, was described in a 1972 BBC Research Report.

=== Point-to-point links ===
NICAM was originally intended to provide broadcasters with six high-quality audio channels within a total bandwidth of 2048 kbit/s. This figure was chosen to match the E1 primary multiplex rate, and systems using this rate could make use of the planned PDH national and international telecommunications networks.

Several similar systems had been developed in various countries, and in about 1977/78 the BBC Research Department conducted listening tests to evaluate them. The candidates were:

- A RAI system which used A-law companding to compress 14-bit linear PCM samples into 10 bits (14:10)
- A NICAM-type system proposed by Télédiffusion de France (14:9)
- NICAM-1 (13:10)
- NICAM-2 (14:11)
- NICAM-3 (14:10)

It was found that NICAM-2 provided the best sound quality, but reduced programme-modulated noise to an unnecessarily low level at the expense of bit rate. NICAM-3, which had been proposed during the test to address this, was selected as the winner.

Audio is encoded using 14 bit pulse-code modulation at a sampling rate of 32 kHz.

=== Broadcasts to the public ===
NICAM's second role – transmission to the public – was developed in the 80s by the BBC. This variant was known as NICAM-728, after the 728 kbit/s bitstream it is sent over. It uses the same audio coding parameters as NICAM-3.

The first NICAM digital stereo programme was the First Night of the 92nd edition of the Proms which was broadcast on BBC2 from the Crystal Palace transmitting station in London on 18 July 1986, though programmes were not advertised as being broadcast in stereo on the BBC until Saturday 31 August 1991, by which time the majority of the country's transmitters had been upgraded to broadcast NICAM, and a large number of BBC programmes were being made in stereo. ITV and Channel 4 only had begun advertising this capability 18 months later, coinciding with the Independent Broadcasting Authority rolling out NICAM on a transmitter-by-transmitter basis, which had begun in 1989 with the Crystal Palace and Emley Moor transmitters.

It has been standardized as ETS EN 300 163.

==== Nations and regions using NICAM public broadcasts ====
Several European countries had implemented NICAM with the PAL and SECAM TV systems

- Belgium (analogue cable systems only; terrestrial switched to DVB-T)
- Denmark (historical, switched to DVB-T and DVB-C)
- Estonia (historical, switched to DVB-T and DVB-C)
- Finland (historical, switched to DVB-T and DVB-C)
- France (historical, switched to DVB-T)
- Greece (ANT1, New Hellenic Television, ET3 and ET1 - historical, switched to DVB-T)
- Hungary (historical, switched to DVB-T)
- Iceland (historical, switched to DVB-T)
- Ireland (historical, switched to DVB-T, DVB-C and IPTV)
- Latvia (historical, switched to DVB-T and DVB-C)
- Luxembourg (switched to DVB-T; cable?)
- Norway (historical, switched to DVB-T and DVB-C)
- Poland (Analogue cable systems only; terrestrial switched to DVB-T)
- Portugal (historical, switched to DVB-T)
- Romania (historical on terrestrial as switched to DVB-T2; on cable networks, still used by some operators providing analogue cable television)
- Russia
- Spain (historical, switched to DVB-T)
- South Africa (SABC 1, SABC 2, e.tv)
- Sweden (historical, switched to DVB-T and DVB-C)
- Ukraine
- United Kingdom (historical, switched to DVB-T)

Some Asia-Pacific nations and regions have implemented NICAM

- China
  - Hong Kong (commonly used for dual language for programming containing both Cantonese and English/Mandarin/Japanese/Korean soundtracks; full switchover to DTMB with Dolby AC-3 audio encoding complete by 1 December 2020, NICAM became historical from that date)
  - Macau (commonly used for dual language for programming containing both Cantonese and Portuguese/English/Mandarin/Japanese/Korean soundtracks; full switchover to DTMB with MPEG-1 Audio Layer II audio encoding complete by 30 June 2023, NICAM became historical from that date)
- Malaysia
  - Formerly used by TV1, TV2, ntv7, 8TV, and TV9 around Klang Valley. TV3 also used NICAM on their VHF transmission frequency (Channel 12) in the Klang Valley, but used Zweikanalton on their UHF transmission frequency (Channel 29). Analog shutdown complete by 31 October 2019, thus NICAM and Zweikanalton broadcast became historical from that date.
- New Zealand (Full switchover to DVB-T complete by 1 December 2013. NICAM became historical from that date.)
- Indonesia
  - Most national television networks in Indonesia used NICAM for analogue television. Analog shutdown complete by August 12, 2023, thus NICAM became historical from that date.
- Singapore (Used on Mediacorp Channel U. Full switchover to DVB-T2 complete by 1 January 2019. NICAM became historical from that date.)
- Sri Lanka
- Thailand
  - Used on Channel 3, Channel 9 MCOT HD and Thai PBS, usually broadcast in dual-sound mode with sometimes in stereo mode. All analogue television service ceased since March 26, 2020. Switchover to terrestrial DVB-T2 with HE-AAC v2 codec, NICAM became historical from that date.

Some other countries use Zweikanalton analogue stereo instead. Analogue stereo conversion thus begins.

== Implementations ==
No consumer grade equipment capable of NICAM modulation is presently known. Below is a non-exhaustive list of broadcast grade equipment capable of NICAM coding and or modulation:

- Philips PM5685/PM5686/PM5686A
- Philips PM5687
- Eiden 198A
- Pye/Varian/BBC Sound-in-Syncs solution
- IBA/RE Communications Sound-in-Syncs solution
- Tektronix 728E
- Rohde & Schwarz SBUF-E NICAM Module
- Barco NE-728
- CableWorld CW-3830

== Operation ==
In order to provide mono "compatibility", the NICAM signal is transmitted on a subcarrier alongside the sound carrier. This means that the FM or AM regular mono sound carrier is left alone for reception by monaural receivers.

A NICAM-based stereo-TV infrastructure can transmit a stereo TV programme as well as the mono "compatibility" sound at the same time, or can transmit two or three entirely different sound streams. This latter mode could be used to transmit audio in different languages, in a similar manner to that used for in-flight movies on international flights. In this mode, the user can select which soundtrack to listen to when watching the content by operating a "sound-select" control on the receiver.

The spectrum of NICAM on the PAL system differs from that on the SECAM L system where the NICAM sound carrier is at 5.85 MHz, before the AM sound carrier, and the video bandwidth is reduced from 6.5 MHz to 5.5 MHz.

NICAM currently offers the following possibilities. The mode is automatically selected by the inclusion of a 3-bit type field in the data stream.

- One digital stereo sound channel.
- Two completely different digital mono sound channels.
- One digital mono sound channel and a 352 kbit/s data channel.
- One 704 kbit/s data channel.

The four other options could be implemented at a later date. Only the first two of the ones listed are known to be in general use however.

=== NICAM packet transmission ===
The NICAM packet (except for the header) is scrambled with a nine-bit pseudo-random bit-generator before transmission.

- The topology of this pseudo-random generator yields a bitstream with a repetition period of 511 bits.
- The pseudo-random generator's polynomial is: $x^9 + x^4 + 1.$
- The pseudo-random generator is initialized with: $111111111.$

Making the NICAM bitstream look more like white noise is important because this reduces signal patterning on adjacent TV channels.

- The NICAM header is not subject to scrambling. This is necessary so as to aid in locking on to the NICAM data stream and resynchronisation of the data stream at the receiver.
- At the start of each NICAM packet the pseudo-random bit generator's shift register is reset to all ones.

=== NICAM transmission problems ===
There are some latent issues involved with the processing of NICAM audio in the transmission chain.

- NICAM (unlike the Compact Disc standard) samples 14-bit audio at 32 kHz.
- The upper frequency limit of a NICAM sound channel is 15 kHz due to anti-aliasing filters at the encoder.
- The original 14-bit PCM audio samples are companded digitally to 10 bits for transmission.
- NICAM audio samples are divided into blocks of 32. If all the samples in a block are quiet, such that the most significant bits are all zeros, these bits can be discarded at no loss.
- On louder samples some of the least significant bits are truncated, with the hope that they will be inaudible.
- A 3-bit control signal for each block records which bits were discarded.
- Digital companding (using a CCITT J.17 pre-emphasis curve) ensures that the encoding and decoding algorithms can track perfectly.

=== NICAM carrier power ===
ITU (and CCITT) standards specify that the power level of the NICAM signal should be at -20 dB with respect to the power of the vision carrier.

- The level of the FM mono sound carrier must be at least -13 dB.
- Measuring the modulation level of the NICAM signal is difficult because the QPSK NICAM carrier waveform (unlike AM or FM modulated carrier waveforms) is not emitted at a discrete frequency.

When measured with spectrum analyser the actual level of the carrier (L) can be calculated using the following formula:

L(NICAM) = L(Measured) + 10 log (R/BWAnalyser) + K

1. L(NICAM) = actual level of the NICAM carrier [dBμV]
2. L(Measured) = measured level of the NICAM carrier [dBμV]
3. R = -3 dB bandwidth of the signal [kHz]
4. BWAnalyser = bandwidth of the spectrum analyser [kHz]
5. K = logarithmic form factor of the spectrum analyser ~2 dB

note: if BWAnalyser is greater than R, the formula becomes L(NICAM) = L(Measured) + K

== Differing features ==
NICAM sampling is not standard PCM sampling, as commonly employed with the Compact Disc or at the codec level in MP3, AAC or Ogg audio devices. NICAM sampling more closely resembles Adaptive Differential Pulse Code Modulation, or A-law companding with an extended, rapidly modifiable dynamic range.

=== Two's complement signing ===
The two's complement method of signing the samples is used, so that:

- 01111111111111 represents positive full-scale
- 10000000000000 represents negative full-scale

=== ±0 V has three binary representations ===
- 00000000000001 represents 0 V, with no +/- distinction. This may have originated as a method to reduce the emergence of DC patterns from transmission of silent material.
- 00000000000000 represents 0 V, with no +/- distinction
- 11111111111111 represents 0 V, with no +/- distinction

=== Parity checking limited to only 6 of 10 bits ===
In order to strengthen parity protection for the sound samples, the parity bit is calculated on only the top six bits of each NICAM sample. Early BBC NICAM research showed that uncorrected errors in the least significant four bits were preferable to the reduced overall protection offered by parity-protecting all ten bits.

== Recording ==
=== VCR ===
VHS and Betamax home videocassette recorders (VCRs) initially only recorded the audio tracks by means of a fixed linear recording head, which was inadequate for recording NICAM audio; this significantly limited their sound quality. Many VCRs later included high quality stereo audio recording as an additional feature, in which the incoming high quality stereo audio source (typically FM radio or NICAM TV) was frequency modulated and then recorded, in addition to the usual audio and video VCR tracks, using the same high-bandwidth helical scanning technique used for the video signal. Full-size VCRs already made full use of the tape, so the high quality audio signal was recorded diagonally under the video signal, using additional helical scan heads and depth multiplexing. The mono audio track (and on some machines, a non-NICAM, non-Hi-Fi stereo track) was also recorded on the linear track, as before, to ensure backwards-compatibility of recordings made on Hi-Fi machines when played on non-Hi-Fi VCRs.

Such devices were often described as "HiFi audio", "Audio FM" / "AFM" (FM standing for "Frequency Modulation") and sometimes informally as "Nicam" VCRs (due to their use in recording the Nicam broadcast audio signal). They remained compatible with non-HiFi VCR players since the standard audio track was also recorded, and were at times used as an alternative to audio cassette tapes due to their superior frequency range and flat frequency response.

=== DVD ===
While recording in video mode (compatible with DVD-Video), most DVD recorders can only record one of the three channels (Digital I, Digital II, Analogue mono) allowed by the standard. Newer standard such as DVD-VR allows recording all the digital channels (in both stereo and bilingual mode), whereas the mono channel will be lost.

=== Flash memory and computer multimedia ===
Codecs for digital media on computers will often convert NICAM to another digital audio format to save drive space.

== See also ==
- Multichannel Television Sound
- Sound-in-Syncs
- VIMCAS
- Zweikanalton A2
