= KRVK =

Coordinates: 42.744°N 106.307°W

- Vista West, Wyoming; United States
- Broadcast area: Casper, Wyoming
- Frequency: 107.9 MHz
- Branding: 107.9 Jack FM

Programming
- Format: Adult hits
- Affiliations: Jack FM network

Ownership
- Owner: Townsquare Media; (Townsquare License, LLC)
- Sister stations: KKTL, KRNK, KTRS-FM, KTWO, KWYY

History
- First air date: 1998 (at 107.7)
- Former frequencies: 107.7 MHz (1998–2001)

Technical information
- Licensing authority: FCC
- Facility ID: 88406
- Class: C1
- ERP: 15,500 watts
- HAAT: 591 meters (1,939 ft)

Links
- Public license information: Public file; LMS
- Webcast: Listen Live
- Website: jackfmcasper.com

KRVK (107.9 FM) is a commercial radio station licensed to Vista West, Wyoming, broadcasting to the Casper, Wyoming area. KRVK airs an adult hits music format branded as "Jack FM". When the station first signed on in 1998, it was broadcasting on 107.7 FM. KRVK is owned and operated by Townsquare Media.
