= Sound-in-syncs =

Method of adding sound to broadcast video

Sound-in-syncs is a method of multiplexing sound and video signals into an analogue television channel designed to carry video, in which data representing the sound is inserted into the line synchronising pulse of the video waveform. This was used on point-to-point links within broadcasting networks, including studio/transmitter links. It was not used for broadcasts to the public.

== History ==
The technique was first developed by the BBC in the late 1960s. In 1966, The corporation's Research Department made a feasibility study of the use of pulse-code modulation (PCM) for transmitting television sound during the synchronising period of the video signal. This had several advantages: it removed the necessity for a separate sound link, reduced the possibility of operational errors and offered improved sound quality and reliability.

=== Awards ===
Sound-in-Syncs and its R&D engineers have won several awards, including:

- The Royal Television Society's Geoffrey Parr Award in 1972
- A Queen's Award for Enterprise in 1974
- In 1999, a Technology & Engineering Emmy Award

== Versions ==
=== Original mono sound-in-syncs ===
In the original system, as applied to 625 line analogue TV, the audio signal was sampled twice during each television line and each sample converted to 10-bit PCM. Two such samples were inserted into the next line synchronising pulse. At the destination, the audio samples were converted back to analogue form and the video waveform restored to normal. Compandors operating on the signal before encoding and after decoding enabled the required signal-to-noise ratio to be achieved. As the PCM noise was predominantly high-pitched, the compandor only needed to operate on the high frequencies. Also, the compandor only operated at high audio levels, so that modulation of the noise by the companding would be masked by the relatively loud high-frequency audio components. A pilot tone at half the sampling frequency was transmitted to enable the expander to track the gain adjustment applied by the compressor, even when the latter was limiting.

Following successful trials with the BBC, in 1971 Pye TVT started to make and sell the sound-in-syncs equipment under licence. The largest quantities went to the BBC itself, to the EBU and to Canada. Smaller numbers went to other countries including South Africa, Australia and Japan.

=== Ruggedised sound-in-syncs ===
A ruggedised version of the system was developed, which provided about 7 kHz audio bandwidth, for use over noisy or difficult microwave paths, such as those often encountered for outside broadcasts.

=== Stereo sound-in-syncs ===
Later systems, developed in the 1980s, used 14-bit linear PCM samples, digitally companded into 10-bit samples by means of NICAM-3 lossy compression. These were capable of carrying two audio channels and were known as stereo Sound-in-Syncs.

=== ITV sound-in-syncs ===
The ITV network used coders and encoders produced by RE of Denmark. The two variations of Sound-in-Syncs used by the BBC and ITV were not compatible. The terms DCSIS or DSIS was commonly used in ITV to describe dual channel Sound-in-Syncs. Very often material carried was not stereo, but dual mono.

== See also ==
- VIMCAS
