= VIMCAS =

Method of encoding digital audio in analogue television

VIMCAS, standing for Vertical Interval Multiple Channel Audio System, is a dual-channel Sound-in-Syncs mechanism for transmitting digitally encoded audio in a composite video analogue television signal.

Invented by Australian company IRT in the 1980s, the basic concept of VIMCAS is to transmit two channels of PCM-encoded (i.e. digital) audio during the vertical blanking interval of a composite video signal. The encoded audio was transmitted over 6 horizontal scan lines during that interval, the digitally encoded signal being placed onto a series of mid-grey pedestals, in much the same way that the colour subcarrier is placed on top of the monochrome signal.

As with the colour subcarrier, there is 4.7kHz bandwidth, so six lines would provide 28kHz of bandwidth (actually slightly less, there being a deliberate redundancy between the final packet of encoded audio on one line and the first packet of encoded audio on the next line to avoid signal corruption). This could be used as a pair of 14kHz channels for stereo audio, or as separate channels to carry dual-language transmissions. In outside broadcast (OB) work, where VIMCAS was used from the OB site back to the studio, it could be used for separate audio channels where one would be effects (i.e. the ambient sound of a sports match) and the other would be the main audio (e.g. the voice of the commentator), or alternatively with the effects audio carried by VIMCAS and the main audio carried as NICAM 728.

To fit into the available bandwidth, the audio signal would first be companded and limited before being sampled for PCM encoding. The encoded signal would be transmitted in the six scanlines in time compressed form, i.e. much faster than its actual speed. Decoding was simply the reverse process, with 100ms of audio (at a time) stored in the transmitted digital form into a digital memory and played out from that memory at original speed through a digital-to-analogue converter, with appropriate timing circuits to synchronize this playout with the accompanying video.

A reduced version, using just one scan line instead of six and thus providing narrower bandwidth, was called VISCAS (Vertical Interval Single Channel Audio System), which was good enough for talkback between the studio and the OB or foldback.
