= Biological Abstracts =

Online database of scientific articles

- Producer: Clarivate Analytics (United States)
- History: 1926–present

Coverage
- Disciplines: Science
- Record depth: Index & abstract

Print edition
- ISSN: 0006-3169

Links
- Website: clarivate.com/webofsciencegroup/solutions/webofscience-biological-abstracts/
- Title list(s): mjl.clarivate.com/cgi-bin/jrnlst/jlresults.cgi?PC=BA

Biological Abstracts is a database produced by Clarivate Analytics. It includes abstracts from peer-reviewed academic journal articles in the fields of biology, biochemistry, biotechnology, botany, pre-clinical and experimental medicine, pharmacology, zoology, agriculture, and veterinary medicine, and has been published since 1926.

It can be accessed through a number of services, including EBSCO, Ovid and Web of Science.

== History ==
The service began as a print publication in 1926, when it was formed by the union of Abstracts of Bacteriology (1917–1925), and Botanical Abstracts (1919–1926), both published in Baltimore by Williams and Wilkins. It was published in paperback subject sections, with abstracts usually written by scientists in the US, as a great many articles from that period were in other languages. At the time of founding, it was in competition with the classified indexing service of the Concilium Bibliographicum in Zurich.

The first online version was published on magnetic tape; it contained only the bibliographic information, not the text of the abstracts, and was intended as a rapid alerting service.

== See also ==
- List of academic databases and search engines
- Lists of academic journals
- List of open-access journals
- List of scientific journals
- Google Scholar

== Other references ==
- Schramm, J. R. (December 11, 1925). "Biological Abstracts". Science. 62 (1615). American Association for the Advancement of Science: 533–536. Bibcode:1925Sci....62..533S. doi:10.1126/science.62.1615.533. JSTOR 1650169. PMID 17801564. S2CID 5386580.
- Scientific committee (December 17, 1937). "Biological Abstracts". Science. 86 (2242). American Association for the Advancement of Science: 561–563. Bibcode:1937Sci....86..561.. doi:10.1126/science.86.2242.561-b. JSTOR 1663788. PMID 17733423.
- Brooks, Stanley Truman (July 1946). "Biological Abstracts". The Scientific Monthly. 63 (1). American Association for the Advancement of Science: 37–41. Bibcode:1946SciMo..63...37T. ISSN 0096-3771. JSTOR 18935. OCLC 1765233.
