= KWYY =

- Midwest, Wyoming; United States
- Broadcast area: Casper, Wyoming
- Frequency: 95.5 MHz
- Branding: 95.5 My Country

Programming
- Format: Country music
- Affiliations: Compass Media Networks

Ownership
- Owner: Townsquare Media; (Townsquare License, LLC)
- Sister stations: KKTL, KRNK, KRVK, KTRS-FM, KTWO

History
- First air date: July 20, 1981 (as KTRS)
- Former call signs: KTRS (1981–1997)

Technical information
- Licensing authority: FCC
- Facility ID: 26300
- Class: C
- ERP: 100,000 watts
- HAAT: 591 meters (1,939 ft)
- Transmitter coordinates: 42°44′37″N 106°18′24″W

Links
- Public license information: Public file; LMS
- Webcast: Listen Live
- Website: mycountry955.com

KWYY (95.5 FM) is a radio station in Casper, Wyoming, branded as "95.5 My Country" and carrying a country music format. The station is currently owned by Townsquare Media.

== History ==
The station came on air as KTRS in 1981. It was the first new station in Casper in 15 years. At the time, there were only four stations available in the city. KTWO, KKTL, KVOC, and KAWY. KTRS was a played rock music from 1981 to 1997 before moving to 104.7 FM. In the mid-1990s, its slogan was "95-5 KTRS". On 104.7, KTRS changed formats to Contemporary Hit Radio swapping frequencies with KYOD.

The move to 95.5 came after being sold by Heart Media to Mountain States Broadcasting. The station was sold again to Clear Channel Radio in 1999. Clear Channel sold its Casper stations to GapWest Broadcasting in 2007. GapWest was folded into Townsquare Media on August 13, 2010.

KWYY is now known as "My Country 955" and is using local DJs, rather than the satellite programming it used previously.

The station airs news broadcasts from its sister station KTWO. Weather forecasts are provided by Cheyenne, Wyoming-based Day Weather.
