= Vista West, Wyoming =

Census-designated place in Natrona County, Wyoming, United States

- Census-designated place
- Location within the state of Wyoming
- Coordinates: 42°52′20″N 106°26′28″W
- Country: United States
- State: Wyoming
- County: Natrona

Area
  - Total: 4.8 sq mi (12 km^{2})
  - Land: 4.8 sq mi (12 km^{2})
  - Water: 0.0 sq mi (0 km^{2})

Population (2010)
  - Total: 951
  - Density: 200/sq mi (76/km^{2})
- Time zone: UTC-7 (Mountain (MST))
  - Summer (DST): UTC-6 (MDT)
- Area code: 307
- FIPS code: 56-80575
- GNIS feature ID: 2409519

Vista West is a census-designated place (CDP) in Natrona County, Wyoming, United States. It is part of the Casper, Wyoming Metropolitan Statistical Area. The population was 951 at the 2010 census.

== Geography ==
According to the United States Census Bureau, the CDP has a total area of 4.8 square miles (12.5 km^{2}), all land.

== Demographics ==
As of the census of 2000, there were 1,008 people, 364 households, and 306 families residing in the CDP. The population density was 206.4 people per square mile (79.8/km^{2}). There were 376 housing units at an average density of 77.0/sq mi (29.7/km^{2}). The racial makeup of the CDP was 96.63% White, 0.40% Native American, 0.60% from other races, and 2.38% from two or more races. Hispanic or Latino of any race were 0.79% of the population.

There were 364 households, out of which 38.5% had children under the age of 18 living with them, 75.3% were married couples living together, 6.0% had a female householder with no husband present, and 15.9% were non-families. 12.1% of all households were made up of individuals, and 3.3% had someone living alone who was 65 years of age or older. The average household size was 2.77 and the average family size was 2.99.

In the CDP, the population was spread out, with 27.1% under the age of 18, 6.3% from 18 to 24, 26.5% from 25 to 44, 32.6% from 45 to 64, and 7.5% who were 65 years of age or older. The median age was 41 years. For every 100 females, there were 107.4 males. For every 100 females age 18 and over, there were 103.0 males.

The median income for a household in the CDP was $45,865, and the median income for a family was $65,865. Males had a median income of $40,074 versus $21,607 for females. The per capita income for the CDP was $25,846. About 1.7% of families and 5.4% of the population were below the poverty line, including 6.2% of those under age 18 and none of those age 65 or over.

== See also ==
- List of census-designated places in Wyoming
