= BBC Research & Development =

Media technology research organization

- Abbreviation: BBC R&D
- Formation: 1922
- Purpose: Technology for media production and broadcasting
- Location: London
- Products: Ceefax, Radio Data System, NICAM, Digital Audio Broadcasting, BBC Online, LS3/5A loudspeaker.
- Director, Research & Development: Jatin Aythora
- Parent organization: BBC
- Awards: Queen's Awards for Enterprise, Emmy Awards, Technology & Engineering Emmy Awards, Webby Awards, Royal Television Society
- Website: www.bbc.co.uk/rd
- Formerly called: BBC Research, BBC Design, BBC Development, BBC Designs & Equipment, BBC Research & Innovation

BBC Research & Development is the technical research department of the BBC.

== Function ==
It has responsibility for researching and developing advanced and emerging media technologies for the benefit of the corporation, and wider UK and European media industries, and is also the technical design authority for a number of major technical infrastructure transformation projects for the UK broadcasting industry.

== Structure ==
BBC R&D is part of the wider BBC Design & Engineering, and is led by Jatin Aythora, Director, Research & Development. In 2011, the North Lab moved into MediaCityUK in Salford along with several other departments of the BBC, whilst the South Lab remained in White City in London.

== History ==
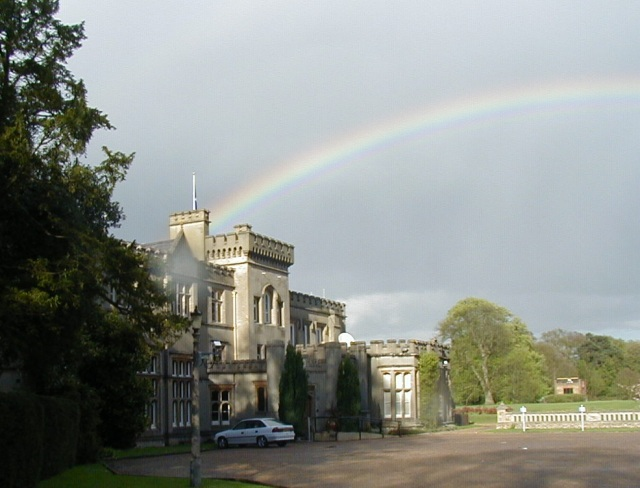
Former site at Kingswood Warren

In April 1930 the Development section of the BBC became the Research Department.

The department, as it stands today, was formed in 1993 from the merger of the BBC Designs Department and the BBC Research Department. From 2006 to 2008, it was known as Research and Innovation but has since reverted to its original name. BBC Research & Development has made major contributions to broadcast technology, carrying out original research in many areas, and developing items like the peak programme meter (PPM), which became the basis for many world standards.

=== Innovations ===
It has also been involved in many well-known consumer technologies such as teletext, DAB, NICAM and Freeview. It was at the forefront of the development of FM radio, stereo FM, and RDS. These innovations have led to Queen's Awards for Innovation in 1969, 1974, 1983, 1987, 1992, 1998, 2001 and 2011.

In the 1970s, its engineers designed the famous LS3/5A studio monitor for use in outside broadcasting units. Licensed to manufacturers, the loudspeaker sold 100,000 pairs in its 20+ years' life.

=== Closure of Kingswood Warren and move to London and Salford ===
In early 2010, the department had approximately 135 staff based at three locations: White City in London, Kingswood Warren in Kingswood, Surrey, and the R&D (North Lab) at the BBC's Manchester offices at New Broadcasting House, Oxford Road, Manchester. In early 2010, the Kingswood Warren site was vacated, and the bulk of the department relocated to Centre House, in White City, London, co-locating with the main campus of the BBC in London, whilst a significant number have moved to the new North Lab in MediaCityUK in Salford. In March 2019, the South Lab moved from Centre House to the Lighthouse building, adjacent to the BBC's Broadcast Centre in White City Place, and Centre House was subsequently demolished.

As of 2020 BBC R&D has more than 200 employees in their UK labs.

== Future projects ==
BBC R&D engineers and researchers are currently active on approximately 50 projects, including 7 active national and international collaborative research efforts.

These include R&D projects built around BBC Redux—the proof of concept for the cross-platform, Flash Video-based streaming version of the BBC iPlayer.

== See also ==
- A-weighting
- Backstage.bbc.co.uk
- CEEFAX
- Dirac (codec)
- Equal-loudness contour
- Institut für Rundfunktechnik — German equivalent
- ITU-R 468 noise weighting
- Kamaelia – Concurrency framework produced by BBC Research & Development
- NICAM
- Peak programme meter
- Sound-in-Syncs
- VERA videotape format
