= Lonclass =

Classification System

The BBC's Lonclass ("London Classification") is a subject classification system used internally at the BBC throughout its archives.

Lonclass is derived from the Universal Decimal Classification (UDC), itself a reworking of the earlier Dewey Decimal Classification (DDC). Lonclass dates from the 1960s, whereas UDC was created from DDC in the late 19th century. The BBC adaptation of UDC preserves the core features that distinguish UDC from DDC: an emphasis on a compositional semantics that allows new items to be expressed in terms of relationships between known items.

Lonclass and UDC (like DDC) are expressed using codes based on decimal numbers. Unlike DDC, the Lonclass and UDC codes use additional punctuation to express patterns of relationships and re-usable qualifiers. While Lonclass makes a few structural adjustments to the UDC system to support its emphasis on TV and radio content, its main distinction is in the actual set of topics that are recorded within its authority file and within specific BBC catalogue records. Unlike UDC and DDC, which are widely used across the library community, Lonclass has remained a BBC-internal system since its creation in the 1960s. There are 300,000 subject terms in the Lonclass vocabulary.

== Examples ==
For example, a Lonclass or UDC code may represent "Report on the environmental impact of the decline of tin mining in Sweden in the 20th century". This would be represented as a sequence of numbers and punctuation. The complex code can be broken down into primitives such as "Sweden" or "tin mining" (which itself could be broken down to "Tin" and "Mining").

Some specific BBC Lonclass examples (with explanatory labels):

- R672:32.007(47)YELTSIN:342.518.1THATCHER "TWO SHOTS OF MARGARET THATCHER AND BORIS YELTSIN"
- [BRITISH AEROSPACE].007.11PEARCE: 656.881:342.518.1THATCHER "LETTER TO MRS THATCHER FROM SIR AUSTIN PEARCE"
- 656.881:301.162.721:32.007THATCHER: 654.192.731TV-AM "MARGARET THATCHER'S LETTER OF APOLOGY TO TV AM"
- 656.881:301.162.721 "LETTERS OF APOLOGY"
- 656.881 "LETTERS (POSTAL SERVICES)"
- 656.881:06.022.6 "RESIGNATION LETTERS"
- 654.192.731TV-AM "TV AM (TELEVISION AM)"
