= KTRS-FM =

Coordinates: 42.744°N 106.307°W

Casper, Wyoming; United States
- Broadcast area: Casper metropolitan area
- Frequency: 104.7 MHz
- Branding: 104.7 KISS FM

Programming
- Language: English
- Format: Contemporary hit radio
- Affiliations: Compass Media Networks; Premiere Networks

Ownership
- Owner: Townsquare Media; (Townsquare License, LLC)
- Sister stations: KKTL; KRNK; KRVK; KTWO; KWYY

History
- First air date: November 1981
- Former frequencies: 95.5 MHz (1981–1997)
- Call sign meaning: The KTRS call letters were originally at 95.5

Technical information
- Licensing authority: FCC
- Facility ID: 26301
- Class: C1
- ERP: 18,000 watts
- HAAT: 554 meters (1,818 ft)

Links
- Public license information: Public file; LMS
- Webcast: Listen live
- Website: www.kisscasper.com

KTRS-FM (104.7 MHz) is a commercial FM contemporary hit radio station in Casper, Wyoming, branded as 104.7 Kiss FM and owned by Townsquare Media. As with a majority of FM stations broadcasting from Casper, the broadcast tower is located south of town on Casper Mountain.

== Station history ==
KTRS was formerly on 95.5 FM. At sign-on, the station was owned by a company known as Wyomedia. The construction permit for the station dates to September 16, 1977. That frequency lasted from its sign-on date in 1981 until 1997. When it was on 95.5 in the early to mid 1980s, the station aired a variety Top 40 format that played everything from Diana Ross to Pat Benatar and Journey. The format shifted in the 90s to harder rock, including Nirvana and Pearl Jam. For a time, it was simply branded "95.5 KTRS".

After Mountain States Broadcasting sold the station to Clear Channel in the late 1990s, the station moved to 104.7 FM. For a short time after the sale and prior to the FCC granting a transfer of the KTRS call letters, the station used the call letters KYOD. Today, KTRS is known as KISS FM, and the playlist is Top 40 that ranges from Electronic Dance Music to Rap/Hip Hop and Pop Rock. KTRS and its sister stations were sold in the late 2000s to Gap West Broadcasting, which became Townsquare Media in 2011.

KTRS features local news from its sister station, KTWO (AM). The station also airs "Report to Wyoming", a public affairs program. Weather forecasts for the station are provided by Cheyenne-based Day Weather.
