= KTWO (AM) =

Radio station in Casper, Wyoming

- Casper, Wyoming; United States
- Broadcast area: Casper metropolitan area
- Frequency: 1030 kHz
- Branding: K2 Radio

Programming
- Format: News/talk
- Affiliations: Fox News Radio; Compass Media Networks; Premiere Networks; Westwood One

Ownership
- Owner: Townsquare Media; (Townsquare License, LLC)
- Sister stations: KKTL, KRNK, KRVK, KTRS-FM, KWYY

History
- First air date: January 2, 1930; 96 years ago
- Former call signs: KDFN (1929–1948); KSPR (1948–1959)
- Call sign meaning: Renamed to match former sister station KTWO-TV, which broadcast on channel 2

Technical information
- Licensing authority: FCC
- Facility ID: 11924
- Class: B
- Power: 50,000 watts
- Transmitter coordinates: 42°50′33.9″N 106°13′9.1″W
- Translator: 95.1 K236CX (Casper)

Links
- Public license information: Public file; LMS
- Webcast: Listen live
- Website: k2radio.com

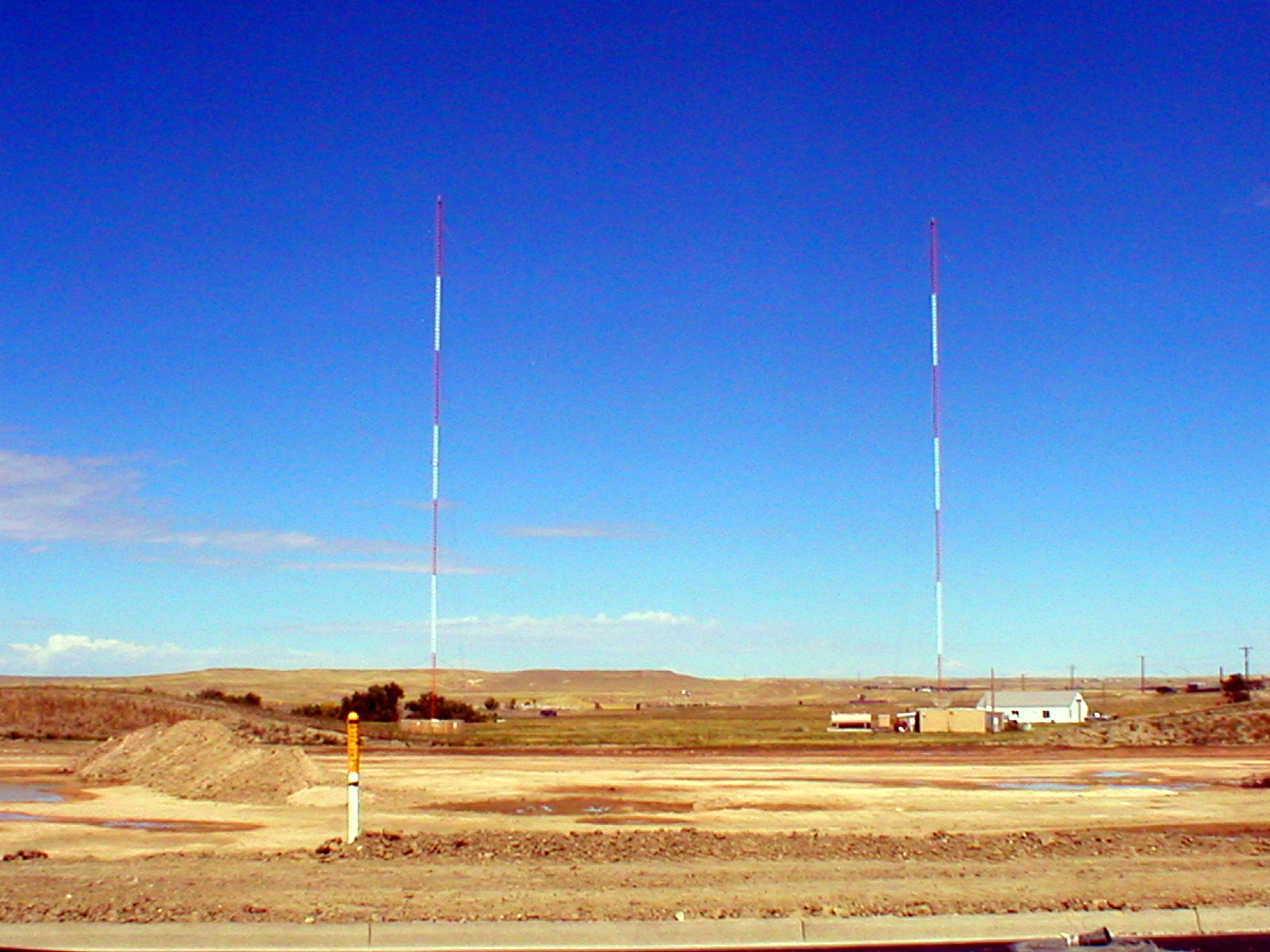
KTWO's towers are located east of Casper.

KTWO (1030 kHz) is an American AM radio station licensed to Casper, Wyoming. KTWO broadcasts a 50,000-watt signal from a two-tower facility located east of Casper near Hat Six Road. The station is directional at night to protect WBZ in Boston. The station features several talk shows such as The Sean Hannity Show and Coast to Coast AM.

KTWO is also very well known for its news department. It features short news broadcasts throughout the day, as well as a half-hour nightly news program entitled "Wyoming Tonight." In addition, the station also offers news broadcasts from Fox News Radio. Weather forecasts for the station are provided by Cheyenne-based "Day Weather."

KTWO is Wyoming's primary entry point station in the Emergency Alert System.

== Signal ==
During the day, a single tower beams the transmitter's full power to almost all of Wyoming. Under the right conditions, the station's daytime signal reaches portions of Nebraska, Colorado and South Dakota. At night, power is fed to both towers in a directional pattern that pushes the signal westward to protect clear-channel WBZ in Boston, also located on 1030. Despite being only a class B (regional) station, KTWO's nighttime signal can be heard in much of the Western United States with a good radio.

KTWO has received nighttime reception reports in Southern California, and Flagstaff, Arizona, domestically. It has also been received internationally in the Netherlands and Japan.

== History ==
KTWO is the oldest commercial AM radio station in Wyoming. It was first authorized, as KDFN, in the summer of 1929, and made its debut broadcast on January 2, 1930. In 1948, the station changed its call sign to KSPR. In 1957 the station's owners established a TV station, KSPR-TV, operating on channel 6, but two years later the TV station was shut down, and KSPR radio was sold to the owners of TV station KTWO-TV in Casper, after which KSPR's call sign was changed to KTWO to match its new sister station.

KDFN was initially licensed to operate on 1210 kHz. In 1932 the station was reassigned to 1440 kHz, and in 1941, under the provisions of the North American Regional Broadcasting Agreement, moved to 1470 kHz. KTWO moved to its current dial position, 1030 kHz, in 1968.

KTWO and its sister KKTL both signed on translators on FM in early 2022.
