= KRNK =

- Casper, Wyoming; United States
- Broadcast area: Casper, Wyoming
- Frequency: 96.7 MHz
- Branding: Rock 96.7

Programming
- Format: Mainstream rock
- Affiliations: Compass Media Networks

Ownership
- Owner: Townsquare Media; (Townsquare License, LLC)
- Sister stations: KKTL, KRVK, KTRS-FM, KTWO, KWYY

History
- First air date: 1997
- Former call signs: KMGW (2001–2009)

Technical information
- Licensing authority: FCC
- Facility ID: 7360
- Class: C2
- ERP: 2,700 watts
- HAAT: 554 meters (1,818 ft)
- Transmitter coordinates: 42°44′37″N 106°18′24″W

Links
- Public license information: Public file; LMS
- Webcast: Listen live
- Website: rock967online.com

KRNK (96.7 FM, "Rock 96.7") is a radio station in Casper, Wyoming, United States, broadcasting a mainstream rock format. The station is currently owned by Townsquare Media.

As is typical for most local FM stations in the Casper market, KRNK's broadcast tower is located on Casper Mountain, south of the city.

== History ==
KRNK has its origins in the summer of 1989, as a soft adult contemporary station known as Magic 94, with calls KMGW. The station was owned by Clear Channel Communications during this period.

The station was assigned the call letters KMLD on September 15, 1997. In the mid-1990s, it became an alternative music station. On August 31, 2001, the station changed its call sign to KMGW and was re-branded as "Star 94", converting back to its original AC format. The station was feeding programming from ABC Radio's "Hits & Favorites" network.

The station moved to its current location on the FM dial in 2001. During the Christmas season local DJs broadcast holiday music. On September 22, 2008, at 6 a.m. Mountain Time, the radio station changed to its current classic rock format, and the calls were flipped to KRNK on September 3, 2009. Just before the switch the station allowed website visitors to vote for the new format, the station advertised several logos, all relating to the given format.

== Signal ==
As with almost every local FM station in the area, the broadcasting tower is located south of town on Casper Mountain. With its 2,700 watt effective radiated power, the station is audible throughout most of Natrona County, and into Converse County, Wyoming. With a car radio or a radio with a sufficient antenna, the station likely can be heard in the town of Midwest, Wyoming, north of Casper. The station's tower has a HAAT of 540 meters (1,770 ft).

== Logos ==
Previous logo until 2008.
