= KKTL =

- Casper, Wyoming; United States
- Frequency: 1400 kHz
- Branding: AM 1400 The Cowboy

Programming
- Format: Classic country

Ownership
- Owner: Townsquare Media; (Townsquare License, LLC)
- Sister stations: KRNK, KRVK, KTRS-FM, KTWO, KWYY

History
- First air date: 1999
- Former call signs: KSPW (1998–1998); KQOL (1998–1998); KMCG (1998–1999)
- Call sign meaning: K K TaLk (former talk format)

Technical information
- Licensing authority: FCC
- Facility ID: 86873
- Class: C
- Power: 1,000 watts (unlimited)
- Transmitter coordinates: 42°51′22″N 106°21′41″W
- Translator: 101.9 K270CT (Casper)

Links
- Public license information: Public file; LMS
- Webcast: Listen Live
- Website: caspercowboy.com

KKTL (1400 AM) is a commercial radio station licensed to Casper, Wyoming, United States. KKTL airs a classic country music format. KKTL previously carried Coast to Coast AM before it was picked up by sister station KTWO.

== Signal ==
KKTL's transmitter is located in the town of Mills, Wyoming, a suburb of Casper. Its 1,000-watt signal can be heard throughout most of central Wyoming.

== History ==
Casper's third radio station, KATI, signed on as "Casper's Favorite Gal" on May 5, 1956. KATI's original construction permit was awarded by the FCC in 1955 to John L. "Jack" Breece, though the call sign was issued in January 1956. In 1959, KATI upgraded its power from 250 watts to 1,000 watts. KATI signed off the air in 1987 due to financial difficulties and major debt, leaving the 1400 kHz frequency dormant. The license was ultimately allowed to lapse in 1993.

KATI upgraded from 250 watts to 1,000 watts in 1959. It was sold in 1963 to Casper Family Radio Inc. and again later to Mod-com Broadcasting.

The debut of a new station KTRS-FM, then on 95.5 FM, created heavy competition for the AM signal, and in 1987 the station signed off. KATI had lost revenue due to a softening local economy, and major debt was owed to a previous owner. The license was donated to the University of Wyoming, but bids were rejected as too low and the cost of restoring it too high for the university, and UW let the license lapse in 1993. After KATI's final owner, Mountain West Broadcasting, went into Chapter 7 liquidation (following Chapter 11 bankruptcy), the station's assets were eventually recovered by a previous note-holder. The licenses for KATI and its FM sister, KGRQ, were briefly transferred to Clear Channel Radio, Inc. (owned by Jack Rosenthal and Robert D. Price, who also owned KTWO). This was completed in March 1989.

The 1400 AM frequency was reactivated in 1999 under different call signs and a new license, beginning with a talk radio and sports format. The station carried the call signs KSPW (1998), KQOL (1998), and KMCG (1998–1999) before settling on KKTL in 1999.

For a period, KKTL aired an ESPN sports format. On February 12, 2018, KKTL switched to its current classic country format, branded as "AM 1400 The Cowboy." The station, along with its sister KTWO signed on translators on FM in 2022. KKTL's translator is on 101.9 MHz.

Logo before translator sign on
