= Outline of design =

Plan for the construction of an object or system

The following outline is provided as an overview of a topical guide to design:

Design (as a verb: designing, or, to design) is the intentional creation of a plan or specification for the construction or manufacturing of an object or system or for the implementation of an activity or process. Design (as a noun: a design) can refer to such a plan or specification (e.g. a drawing or other document) or to the created object, etc., and features of it such as aesthetic, functional, economic or socio-political.

== Design professions ==
- Architecture – An Architect typically has a B.Arch or M.Arch, as well as professional certification through groups such as the NCARB. Their primary focus is the design of buildings.
- Engineering – An Engineer typically has a BS or MS degree, as well as professional certification as a Professional Engineer. They primarily focus on applying. No professional certification is required. Their primary focus is the design of apparel.
- Graphic design – A Graphic Designer typically has a BFA or MFA. No professional certification is required. Their primary focus is the design of visual communication.
- Industrial design – An Industrial Designer typically has a BFA or MFA. No professional certification is required. Their primary focus is the design of physical, functional objects.
- Interior design – An Interior Designer typically has a Bachelor's degree. No professional certification is required. Their primary focus is the design of human environment, particularly affecting aesthetics and emotions.
- Software design – A Software designer typically has a BS or MS degree in computer science. While professional certification is not required, many exist. Their primary focus is the functional design of computer software.

== Design approaches and methods ==
- Co-Design
- Creative problem solving
- Creativity techniques
- Design-build
- Design for X
- Design management
- Design methods
- Design Science
- Design thinking
- Engineering design process
- Error-tolerant design
- Fault tolerant design
- Functional design
- Metadesign
- Mind mapping
- Open-design movement
- Participatory design
- Reliable system design
- Strategic design
- TRIZ
- Universal design
- User innovation

== Design activities ==
- Creativity
- Design methods
- Design thinking

=== Designing objects ===
- Business
  - New product development
- Engineering
  - Cellular manufacturing
  - Mechanical engineering
  - New product development
  - System design
- Fashion
  - Fashion design
- Graphic design
  - Game design
  - Packaging design
- Industrial design
  - Automotive design
  - Industrial design
  - New product development
  - Product design
- Software design
  - Game design
  - New product development
  - Software engineering
  - Software design
  - Software development
- Other
  - Furniture
  - Floral design

=== System design ===
- System design
  - Business
    - New product development
    - Service design
  - Engineering
  - Graphic design
    - Information design

=== Design tools ===
- Computer-aided design
- Graphic organizers

=== Environments and experiences ===
- Architects
  - Building design
  - Urban design
- Graphic design
  - Communication design
  - Motion graphic design
  - User interface design
  - Web design
- Interior design
  - Experience design
  - Interaction design
- Software design
  - User experience design
- Other
  - Garden design
  - Landscape design
  - Sound design
  - Theatrical design

=== Impact of design ===
- Creative industries
- Design classic

== Design organizations ==
- European Design Awards
- Chartered Society of Designers

=== Studying design ===
- Critical design
- Design research
- Wicked problem – problem that is difficult or impossible to solve because of incomplete, contradictory, and changing requirements that are often difficult to recognize. The use of term "wicked" here has come to denote resistance to resolution, rather than evil. Moreover, because of complex interdependencies, the effort to solve one aspect of a wicked problem may reveal or create other problems.
