= Traité de Documentation =

Book by Paul Otlet

Traité de documentation: le livre sur le livre, théorie et pratique is a landmark book by Belgian author Paul Otlet, first published in 1934.

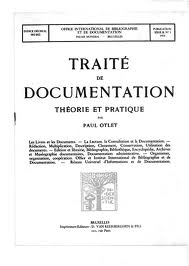
The front cover of Traité de documentation.

== Legacy ==
The book is considered a landmark in the history of information science, with concepts predicting the rise of the World Wide Web and search engines.

In [Otlet's] most famous publication of 1934, Traité de Documentation, he wrote of a desk in the form of a wheel from which different projects (workspaces) could be switched as they rotated — foreshadowing the multiple desktops and tabs of contemporary computer interfaces. Inspired by the arrival of radio, phonograph, cinema, and television, Otlet also posited that there were as yet many “inventions to be discovered,” including the reading and annotation of remote documents and computer speech.

== See also ==
- Mundaneum
- Traité de documentation on Wikisource.
- Mondothèque
