= Glut: Mastering Information Through the Ages =

2007 book by Alex Wright

- Author: Alex Wright
- Language: English
- Genre: Non-fiction
- Publisher: Joseph Henry Press
- Publication date: 2007
- Publication place: United States
- Media type: Print (Hardback)
- Pages: 296 pp
- ISBN: 978-0-309-10238-4 (hbk.)
- OCLC: 85692734
- Dewey Decimal: 020.9 22
- LC Class: Z666.5 .W75 2007

Glut: Mastering Information Through The Ages is a 2007 book written by Alex Wright, a writer and information architect for The New York Times. Wright's intention is to provide a broad historical overview of the development of information transmission and organization systems.

== Chapters ==
- Chapter 1: Networks and hierarchies

Wright asserts the idea that while networks are currently an en vogue topic of discussion, frequently framed as being in opposition to hierarchical systems, that each co-exists and has always done so. He posits that:

"The fundamental tension between networks and hierarchies has been percolating for eons. Today, we are simply witnessing the latest installment in a long evolutionary drama."

Wright goes on to discuss various aspects of evolutionary learning in numerous contexts. This ultimately leads to the question of whether man's information systems are still evolving, or did they simply stop when we reached our current evolutionary state. Wright looks for a possible answer in the work of sociobiologist E.O. Wilson and his theory of gene-culture co-evolution and 'epigenetic rules':

"Epigenetic rules come in two flavors: primary epigenetic rules govern our immediate sense perceptions, such as our universal tendency to perceive the color spectrum in four basic color groups...; secondary epigenetic rules operate at a higher level of abstraction such as the tendency for all human beings to classify objects into opposing pairs like black and white, life and death, heaven and earth—notions that have no physical component in the human brain, yet seem to recur across human cultures."

That is to say, we are predisposed toward classification.

- Chapter 2: Family trees and the tree of life
- Chapter 3: The ice age information explosion

Wright discusses the evolution of symbolic communication and the use of external symbolic objects as a unit of cultural exchange. Wright contend that primitive symbolism in all its forms drove the development of larger, more complex social networks and eventually make way for the evolution of writing.

- Chapter 4: The age of alphabets
- Chapter 5: Illuminating the dark age
- Chapter 6: A steam engine of the mind

Traces the development of print technology and the subsequent spread of written literacy. The chapter also addresses the role of religious texts and their impact on Western thought. Wright quotes author John Lothrop Motley:

"The eerie conjunction of the printing press, steeply rising literacy rates, religious wars and the witch craze seem significant."

- Chapter 7: The astral power station
- Chapter 8: The encyclopedic revolution
- Chapter 9: The moose that roared

Discusses the evolution of classification systems including the Systema Naturae of Carl Linnaeus, which was hierarchical in nature and standing in opposition to the work of French naturalist Georges-Louis Leclerc, Comte de Buffon, who contended a more holistic approach would be better, taking into account that despite environmental similarities, different regions have distinct plants and animals. He made the suggestion that species may have both "improved" and "degenerated" after dispersing from a center of creation. The chapter title makes reference to the 7 foot moose Thomas Jefferson had shipped to Buffon after Buffon contended that no American animal could be compared to those of the old world. Wright contends that Jefferson to a large degree is an unsung hero of information science, due to his support of the Linnaean hierarchy and his adaptation of table of science originated by Francis Bacon for classification of his personal library.

- Chapter 10: The industrial library

Brief historical record of the development of the modern library and classification systems by Charles Ammi Cutter (Cutter Expansive Classification system, which was the basis for the top categories of the Library of Congress classification) as well Colon classification developed by S. R. Ranganathan, an example of a faceted classification system and perhaps the most prominent classification system in the Western world, the Dewey Decimal System created by Melvil Dewey.

- Chapter 11: The Web that wasn't

Traces the evolution of the modern day web. Notable discussions include:

  - Paul Otlet and his Mundaneum
  - The prescient writings of Vannevar Bush (most notably the essay "As We May Think" which introduced the idea of the Memex)
  - "The Mother of All Demos", during which Douglas Engelbart featured the first computer mouse to be seen by the public, as well as the introduction interactive text, video conferencing, teleconferencing, email and hypertext
  - Ted Nelson and his development of hypertext with partner Douglas Engelbart as well as his Xanadu project. Wright notes that Nelson's vision of the a networked information structure is prescient not only in terms of network architecture, but issues of security, privacy, and copyright.
  - ARPA and the development of the web as we know it today, on which Ted Nelson opines:
    "The Web isn't hypertext, it's DECORATED DIRECTORIES! What we have instead is the vacuous victory of typesetters over authors, and the most trivial form of hypertext that could have been imagined."
- Chapter 12: Memories of the future
- Appendix A: John Wilkins' Universal Categories from An Essay towards a Real Character and a Philosophical Language
- Appendix B: Thomas Jefferson's 1783 Catalog of Books
- Appendix C: The Dewey Decimal System

== Reviews ==
- Review from New Scientist
- Review from the Los Angeles Times
- Review from Boxes and Arrows

== See also ==
- Tim Berners-Lee - Computer scientist and professor credited with creating the World Wide Web
- Ted Nelson - One of the two men credited with the invention of hypertext
- Douglas Engelbart - Collaborator of Ted Nelson
- Paul Otlet - Belgian bibliographer, creator of the Universal Decimal Classification, an example of faceted classification
  - Mundaneum - Home to Paul Otlet's project to collect and organize the world's knowledge
