= André Canonne =

Belgian writer and librarian

André Canonne (2 December 1937 – 13 August 1990) was a Belgian writer and librarian.

== Early life ==
André Canonne was born in the town of Wasmes in Belgium.

== Career ==
André Canonne held numerous jobs as a librarian and archivist. He provided assistance to the French department of public libraries.

He was the chief librarian of the central library of Hainaut.

He wrote a number of books on librarianship and management of books and information.

He was the guardian and promoter of Paul Otlet's Mundaneum institution.

== Bibliography ==
- Manuel élémentaire de catalographie (Ed. du CLPCF, 1986, ISBN 2-87130-008-9)
- Dis, donne moi une histoire : répertoire thématique d'albums de fictions pour enfants (Ed. du CLPCF, 1989;
- Vocabulaire élémentaire des classifications (Ed. CEFAL, 1993, ISBN 2-87130-029-1)
- Traité de documentation : le livre sur le livre, théorie et pratique (Ed. du CLPCF, 1989; réimp. de l'éd. de 1934; Préface de Robert Estivals, Avant-propos d'André Canonne. ISBN 2-87130-015-1)
