= Alex Wright (author) =

American writer

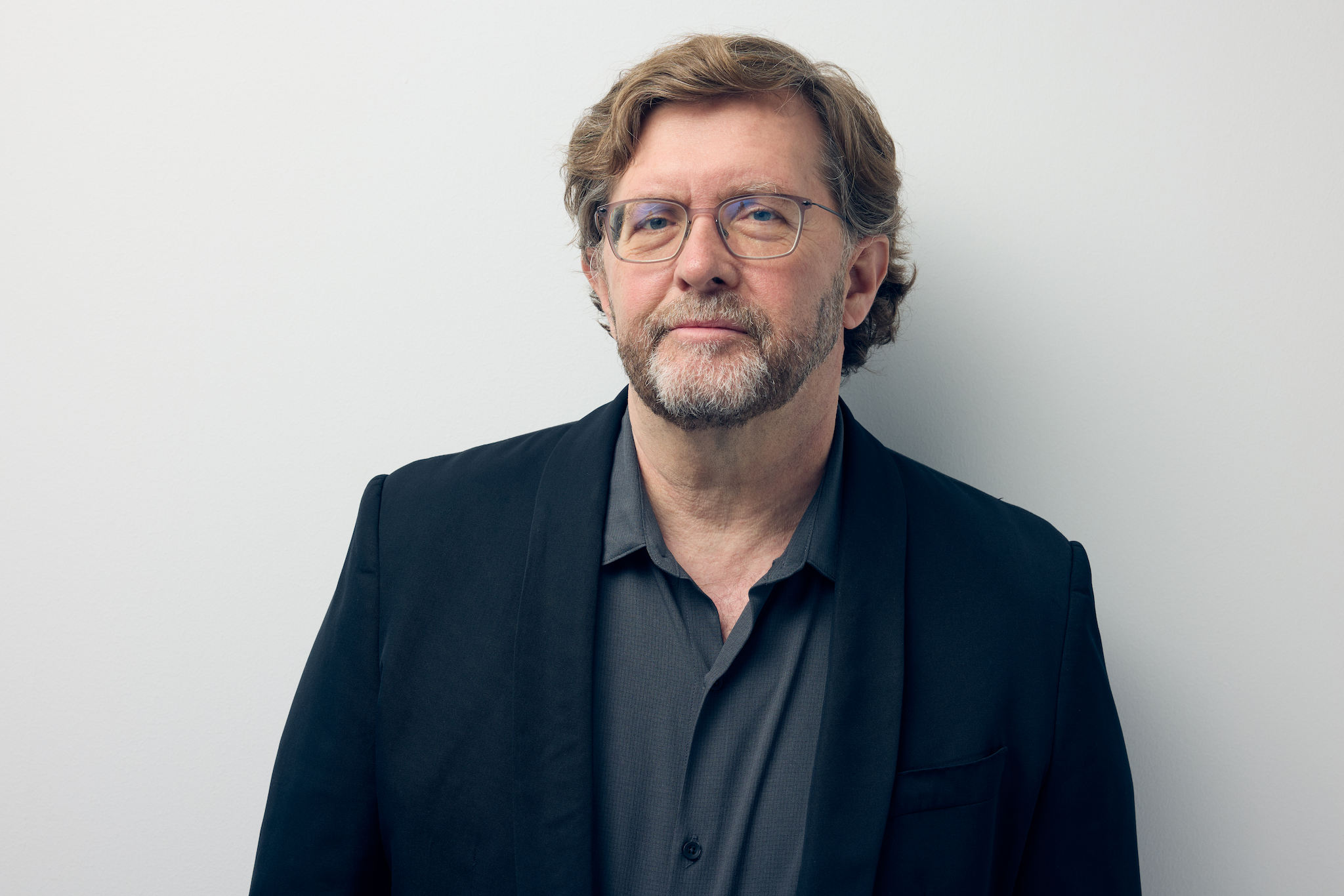
Alex Wright in 2025

Alex Wright is an American writer who has also worked in the fields of user experience and information design. He is the author of Cataloging the World: Paul Otlet and the Birth of the Information Age (2014), Glut: Mastering Information Through the Ages (2007), and the forthcoming Empire of Ink: The Printers, Rogues, and Radicals Who Invented American Media (Basic Books, 2026). A revised edition of Glut was published by Cornell University Press in 2023 under the title Informatica. Wright's writing has appeared in publications including The New York Times, The Atlantic, Salon, The Believer, and Communications of the ACM.

== Biography ==
Wright holds a Ph.D. in Transition Design from Carnegie Mellon University, an M.S. in Library and Information Science from Simmons College, and a B.A. in English literature from Brown University. From 2008 to 2019, he taught in the MFA Interaction Design program at the School of Visual Arts in New York. Throughout his career, he has been a frequent contributor to The New York Times. Wright currently resides in Brooklyn, New York with his wife, two sons, and dog, Yoda. He has held UX leadership roles at Instagram, Etsy, The New York Times, and IBM; and has consulted for clients including frog design, Adobe, Yahoo!, The New York Public Library, and the Internet Archive, among others.

== Bibliography ==
- Wright, Alex (2007). Glut:Mastering Information Through the Ages. National Academies Press. ISBN 978-0801475092.
- Wright, Alex (2014). Cataloging the World:Paul Otlet and the Birth of the Information Age. Oxford University Press. ISBN 9780199354207.
