= Mondothèque =

Proposed multimedia workstation designed in 1934

Fig. 1: A mock-up of the Mondothèque at the Mundaneum archive

The Mondothèque was a multimedia device hypothesised in the 1930s by Paul Otlet, co-founder of the Mundaneum, an institution which aimed to collect and classify all of the world's knowledge. It was to combine books, images, maps and other media into a single search experience. It was never built, because the available technology of the time: index cards, telegraph and microfiche were not powerful enough to match the original vision. It has been recently rediscovered and claimed as a precursor to the Internet.

== Origins ==
The Mundaneum was an institution that aimed to gather together all the world's knowledge and classify it according to a system known as the Universal Decimal Classification. It was developed at the turn of the 20th century by Belgian lawyers Paul Otlet and Henri La Fontaine. The Mundaneum has been identified as a milestone in the history of data collection and management,

In the early years of the Mundaneum access to data was by a card index system, it would eventually reach more than 15 million entries. Otlet had already considered how the cards could be used more effectively, and in 1896, he set up a fee-based service to answer questions by mail, by sending the requesters copies of the relevant index cards for each query; scholar Alex Wright referred to the service as an "analog search engine". By 1912, this service responded to over 1,500 queries a year. This idea was incorporated into the design of the Mondothèque. ^{ch 52}

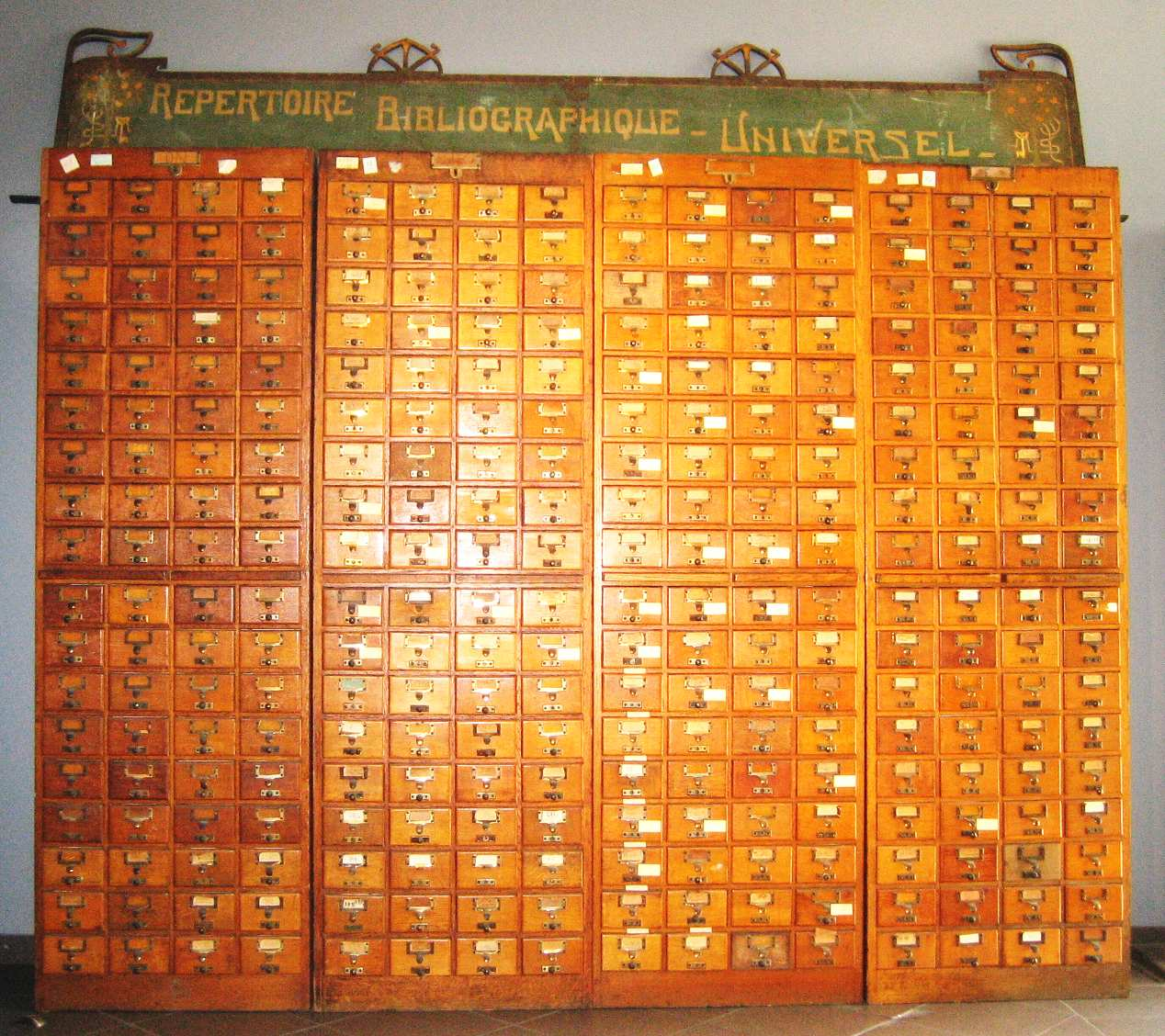
Drawers of the Mundaneum's Universal Bibliographical System bibliographic index cards

With the closure of the Palais Mondial, Otlet was increasingly free to dispense with the practicalities of devices the card catalogues he had been depending on. His ideas became more fanciful and he envisioned "a new kind of personal study with its special workstation, the Mondothèque". His vision included the use of new communication technologies using the telephone as a primitive modem.

It was to be an "intellectual machine", and to incorporate the capabilities of an archive, a link generator, a catalogue and a broadcasting station. He imagined multiple machines as elements in an interdependent web of relations.

The Mondothèque was Otlet’s attempt to bring a ‘God’s-Eye-view’of the universe of knowledge within the reach of every individual.

== Design and Vision ==
Having assembled his vast collection into the Mundaneum, Otlet created plans for a "réseau" or network of "electric telescopes" in 1934 to allow people to search through a large quantity of interlinked documents. His idea included the ability to send messages between researchers and to create virtual communities. Too early for computers, his plan made use of physical cards and telegraphs.

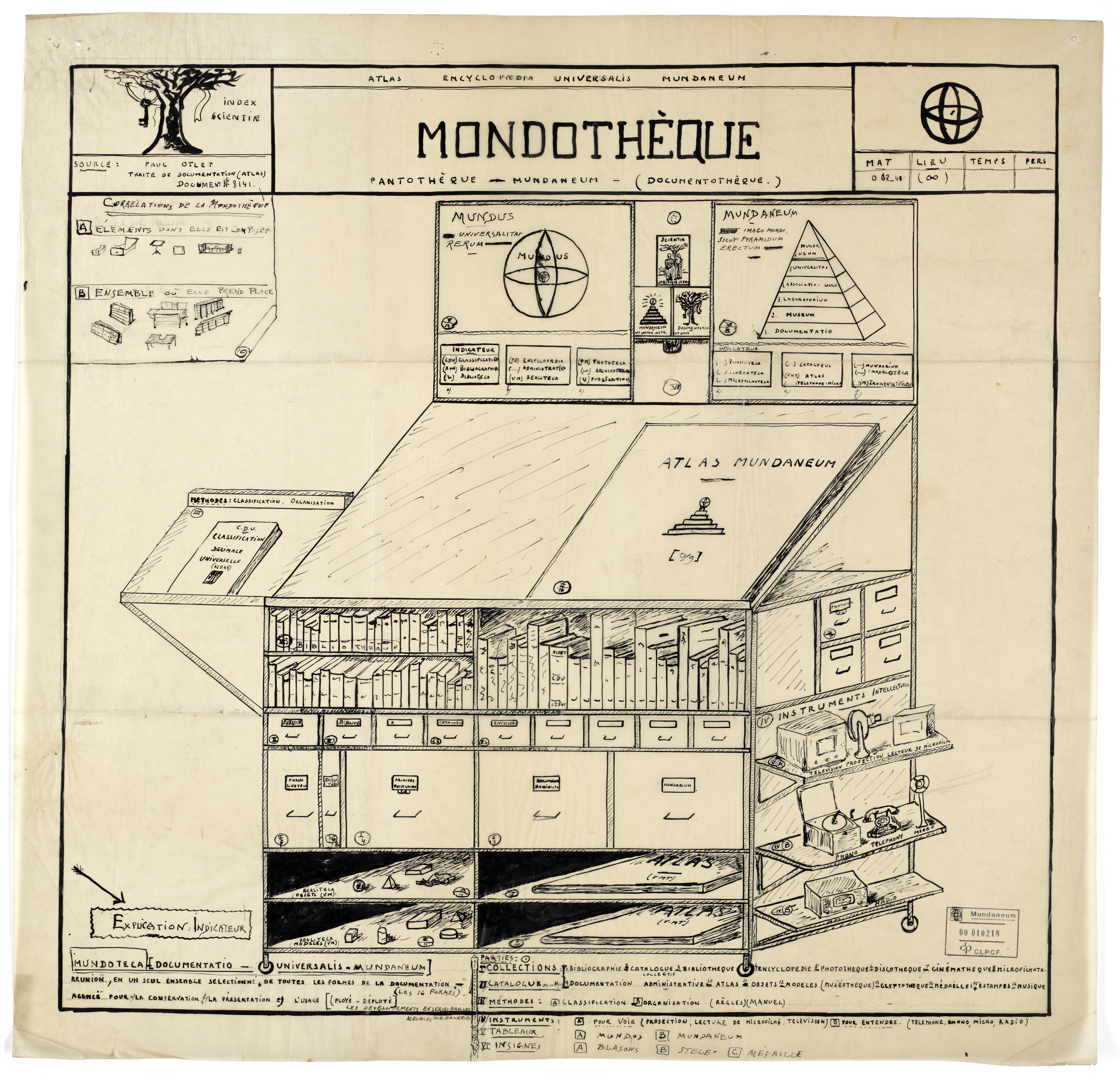
Fig. 2: The Mondothèque drawing from the Mundaneum archive

As well as conventional office equipment such as a portable typewriter, a dictation machine, a mathematical calculator the console was to incorporate a mechanism for searching punch cards, inspired by the work of Melvil Dewey and Herman Hollerith.

The Mondothèque shown in Figure 2 was conceived as a personal workstation and bears a resemblance to the personal computer. On his prototype diagram it is possible to see devices such as a television, a projector, a box of microfilms, a record player, a telephone, a microphone and a radio, which were supposed to convey both visual and audio material in response to a query. The UDC catalogue on the left acts as a "browser".

The desktop includes three "software packages" : An Atlas of the World (Atlas Mundaneum), and two additional screens : the Sphaera Mundaneum which allows a user to explore through different domains and dimensions of knowledge all indexed according to the Universal Decimal Classification system, and the Pyramid of the Mundaneum which supplies a visualisation of the hierarch of knowledge.

Made of wood, it combines essential books, atlas plates in the form of visual encyclopaedias, small objects (especially from museums), the Universal Bibliographic Directory and its bibliographic records and microfilms.

The device was to be able to request pages from books in centralised libraries, with remote librarians responding to incoming requests from remote users and returning text on a screen and audio material to a speaker on the desk that initiated the request. ^{pp 387-391}

As Otlet explained,

"Here, the work table is no longer loaded with any books. In their place stands a screen and a telephone within reach. There, in the distance, in an immense building, are all the books and all the information. From there, the page to be read to find out the question asked by phone appears on the screen." ^{ch 52}

The device was never built, but a mock-up was constructed by the Mundaneum museum, see Figure 1.

== The vision of the Réseau mondial (Global Network) ==
In 1934, Otlet laid out this vision of a system of networked computers, "electric telescopes" ^{p238} that would allow people to search millions of interlinked documents. The vision included what we now call hyperlinks, multimedia and a search engine. ^{p8}

Fig 3. The vision for the Réseau mondial, 1940

Otlets vision for the Mundaneum envisioned a copy ofit in each major city around the world, with Brussels holding the master copy. At various times between 1900 and 1914, attempts were made to send full copies of the RBU to cities such as Paris, Washington, D.C. and Rio de Janeiro; however, difficulties in copying and transportation meant that no city received more than a few hundred thousand cards.

His key break from the original library vision was that knowledge should not be stored centrally, in libraries, it should come to the user. Otlet even experimented with paper cut-outs of people to focus on what we would now call user experience.

The Mundaneum was not just conceived as a single building, but as a network of buildings. These buildings with their international collections would be linked to create ‘le reseau’ (the network). This network would link the world’s citizens in a hierarchical structure from a personal office, via many different forms of Mundaneum (from small to large) to a World City, which Otlet was heavily promoting to be in Brussels. (see Figure 3).

In one of his last sketches (1940), Otlet had expanded the idea of the Mundaneum (and implicitly, the Mondothèque) as a transmitter of knowledge by sound (radio and telephone) and by image (television), and used the term "Thinking Machine", foreshadowing concepts such as video conferencing and social media.

His vision extended beyond information retrieval into a utopian vision of society. The Mondothèque was a component of a much larger project to make the accumulated knowledge universally available, imagining a system when someone could sit in a chair and contemplate the entire universe.

== Revival ==
In 2011, information historians Charles van den Heuvel and W. Boyd Rayward studied the Mondothèque as part of their analysis of networked information systems. They produced a new poster which presented it not as a collection of materials but as a visionary interface to a worldwide network of knowledge resources.

In the 21st century, the Mundaneum is a non-profit organisation based in Mons, Belgium, that runs an exhibition space, website, and archive, which celebrate the legacy of the original Mundaneum. The museum contains the personal papers of Otlet and La Fontaine and the archives of the various organizations they created along with all of Otket's sketches, including the picture shown on this page..

The curators popularised the idea that the Mondothèque was "like Google, but on paper"

On August 23, 2015, a Google Doodle depicting the Mundaneum filing cabinets was released. The Doodle was meant to pay tribute to the creators of the Mundaneum as pioneers of open information.

Mondotheque.be was a modern project developed by Constant, a Belgian non-profit to study whether the Mondothèque could really be seen as the foundation for the modern internet.

== Legacy ==
Otlet's writings have sometimes been called prescient of the current World Wide Web. His vision of a great network of knowledge was centred on documents and included the notions of hyperlinks, search engines, remote access, and social networks—although these notions were described by different names. Kevin Kelly, ex-Editor of Wired called it "A Steampunk version of hypertext",

Not all academics agree that Otlet's top-down empirical approach (positivism) is fundamentally different from the democratic nature of the internet and that what he proposed was in fact conceptually different from the hypertext systems that have been developed today.

In the light of the advent of information and communication technologies, the Mondothèque can appear as a forerunner of many modern technologies such as the personal computer, Wikipedia or the Semantic Web.
