= Hôtel Otlet =

Historic Art Nouveau house in Brussels, Belgium

- Hôtel Otlet (French); Hotel Otlet (Dutch)
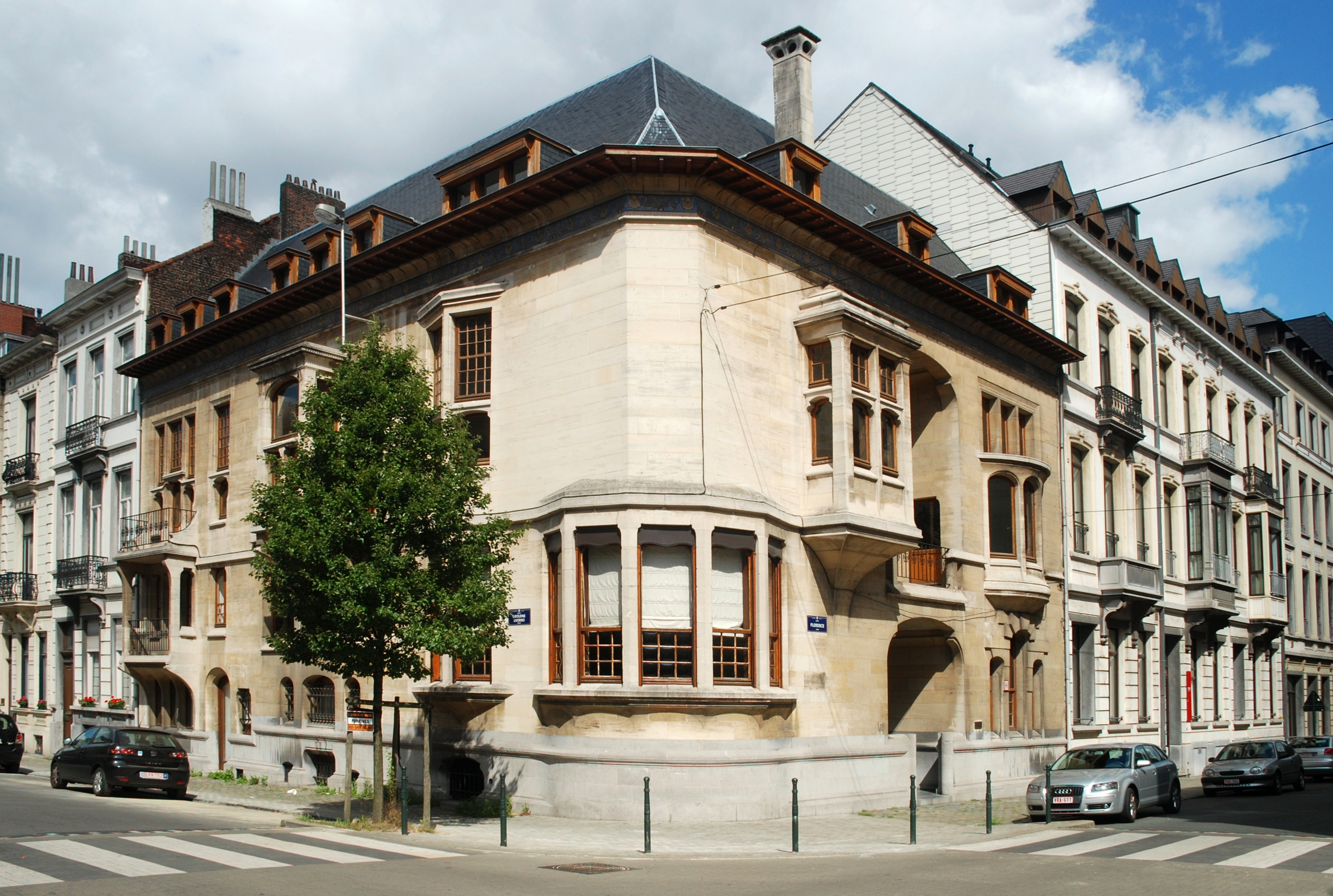
- Main façades of the Hôtel Otlet

General information
- Type: Town house
- Architectural style: Art Nouveau
- Location: Rue de Florence / Florencestraat 13, 1000 City of Brussels, Brussels-Capital Region, Belgium
- Coordinates: 50°49′46″N 4°21′35″E
- Construction started: 1894
- Completed: 1898
- Client: Paul Otlet

Design and construction
- Architect: Octave van Rysselberghe

The Hôtel Otlet (French: Hôtel Otlet; Dutch: Hotel Otlet) is a historic town house in Brussels, Belgium. It was designed by the architect Octave van Rysselberghe for the jurist, bibliographer and entrepreneur Paul Otlet, and built between 1894 and 1898, in Art Nouveau style. This work marks the still cautious insertion of Van Rysselberghe into that style.

The house is located on the corner of the Rue de Florence/Florencestraat and the Rue de Livourne/Livornostraat, a few steps from the Avenue Louise/Louizalaan.

== History ==
The Hôtel Otlet was built from 1894 to 1898 for the jurist, bibliographer and entrepreneur Paul Otlet. Van Rysselberghe completed this project more than ten years after the completion of his Hôtel Goblet d'Alviella in 1882.

The building was classified as a protected monument in 1984 and restored from 2001 to 2003. It currently houses a law office.

== Location ==
The hôtel particulier is located in Brussels, at the corner of the Rue de Livourne/Livornostraat (no. 48) and the Rue de Florence/Florencestraat (no. 13) in the same street where Van Rysselberghe built his personal house (Van Rysselberghe House, rue de Livourne no. 83), in the heart of a district that is home to many masterpieces of Brussels Art Nouveau such as the Hôtel Solvay, the Hôtel Tassel and the Hankar House.

== Exterior architecture ==
=== Style and material ===
Like Octave Van Rysselberghe's other creations, the Hôtel Otlet was built in a very sober Art Nouveau style, at odds with the Rococo excesses of certain Art Nouveau architects such as Gustave Strauven.

The house is built in carefully paired Savonnières stone, a golden-coloured cut stone from Lorraine, France, with the exception of the basement, which is made of blue stone.

=== Asymmetries and sets of volumes ===
The façade has a turbulent appearance, which results from the abandonment of symmetry and the interplay of incoming and outgoing volumes, and which is tempered by an impression of unity conferred by the horizontal lines of the basement and the cornice.

The two completely asymmetrical façades are linked together by a corner oriel window with a harmonious effect. These façades offer a subtle interplay of volumes (bow window, oriel, cubicles, balcony, loggia and porch), asymmetrical in their shape, their layout and their number of bays. All these elements are subtly linked together by the cordon that delimits the ground floor and the first floor.

=== Façade of the Rue de Florence ===
==== Ground floor ====
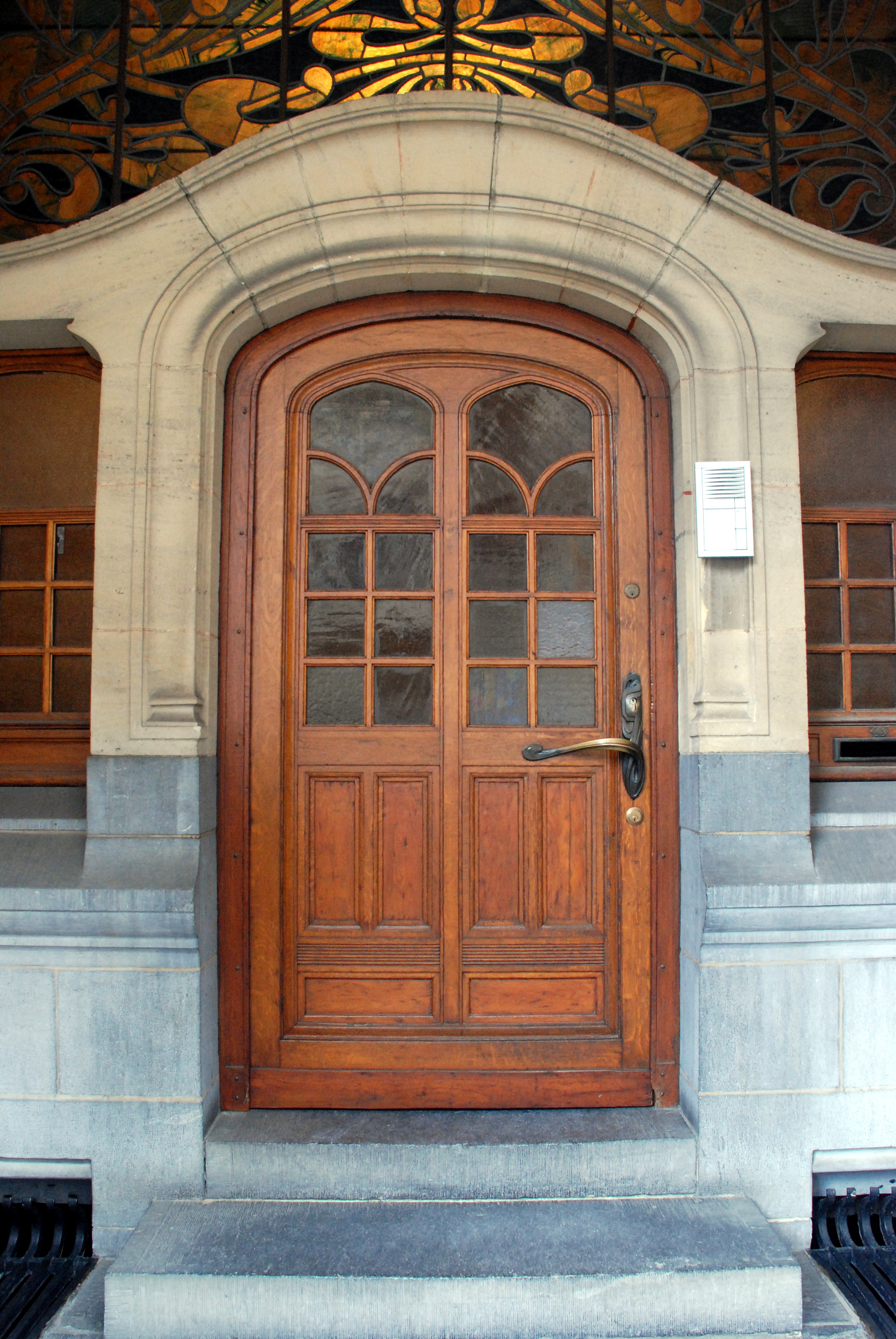
The door sheltered by the porch

The ground floor of the Rue de Florence façade is pierced by an "in-work" porch, whose vault is made of glazed white bricks. This porch houses a door adorned with a handle with whiplash lines typical of floral Art Nouveau. The door is surmounted by a stained glass window in orange, green and black tones, also featuring floral motifs characteristic of Art Nouveau.

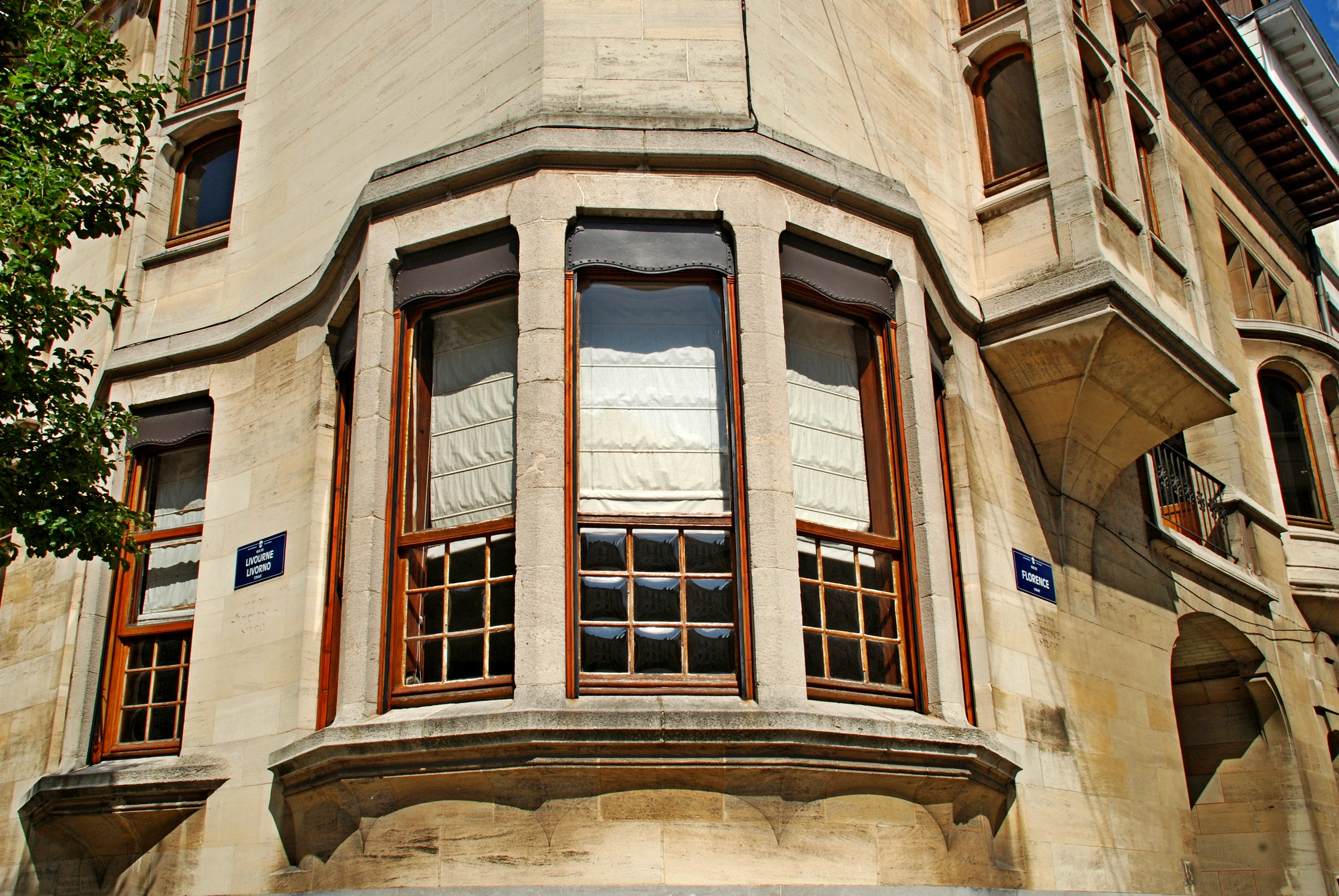
The corner oriel

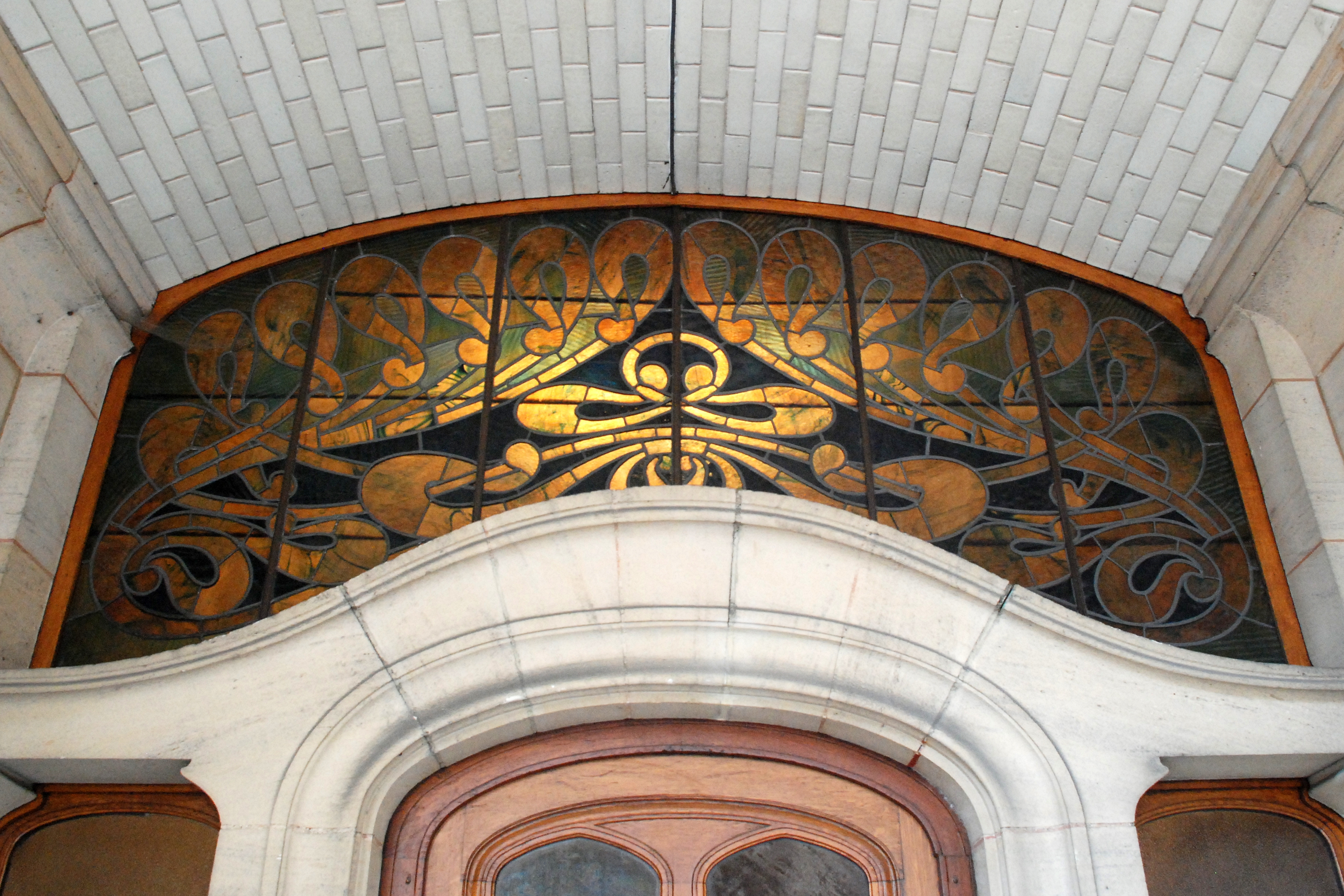
Art Nouveau stained glass

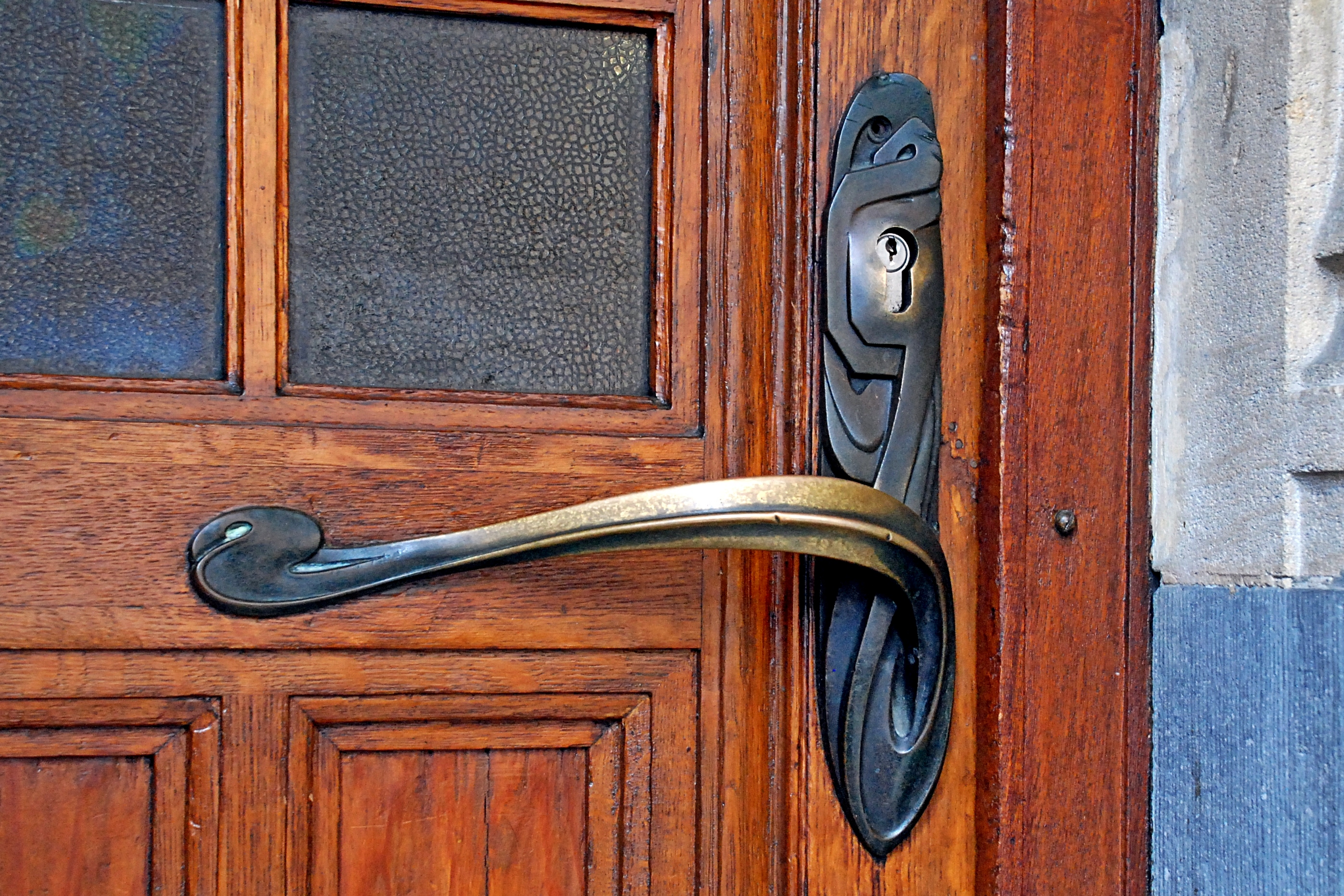
Door handle

==== First floor ====
The porch is surmounted by a loggia embedded in the façade of the first floor: vaulted with glazed bricks like the porch, it houses two rows of windows, one of which consists of windows of increasing size. This loggia is framed by a cubicle and a bow window.

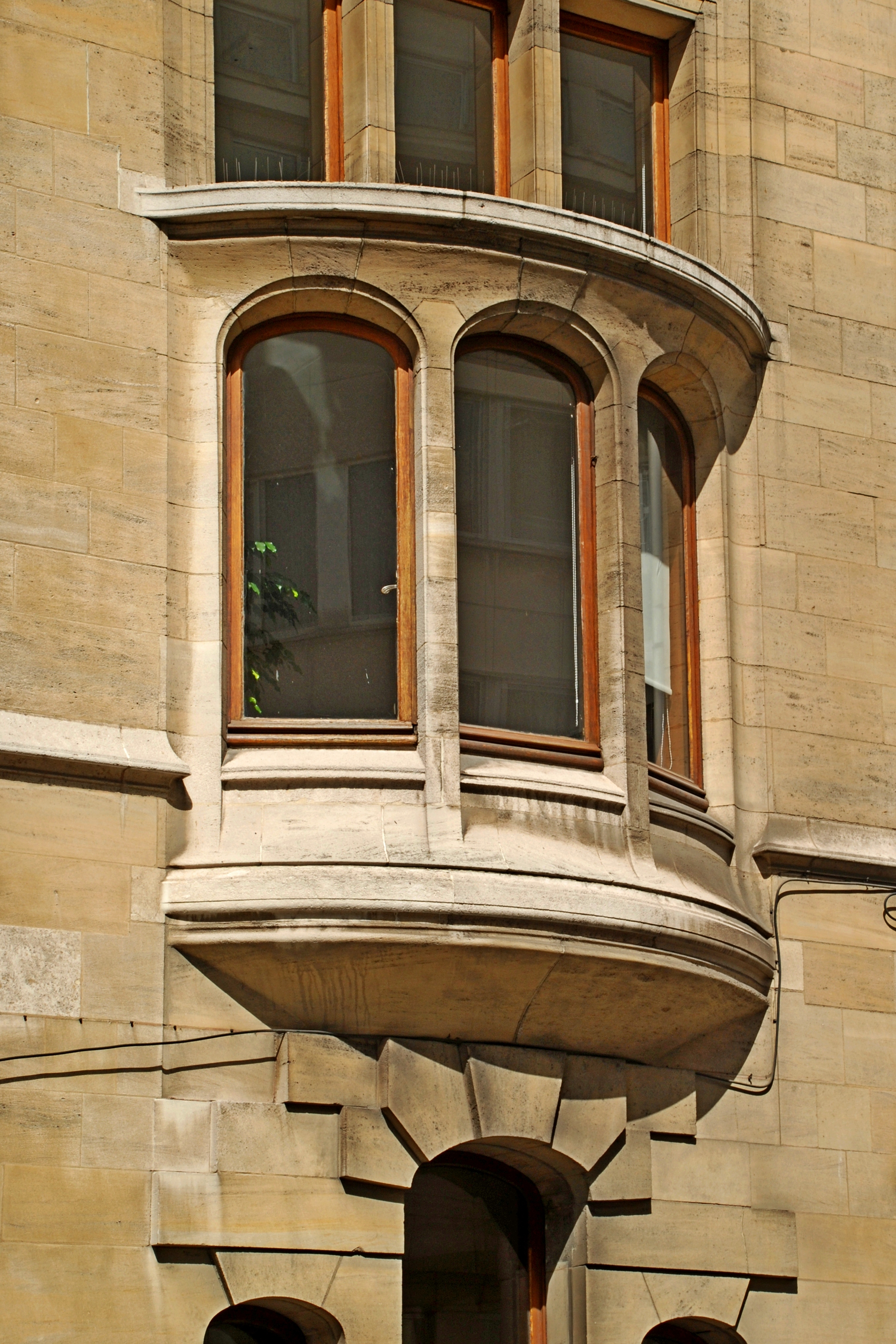
The bow window

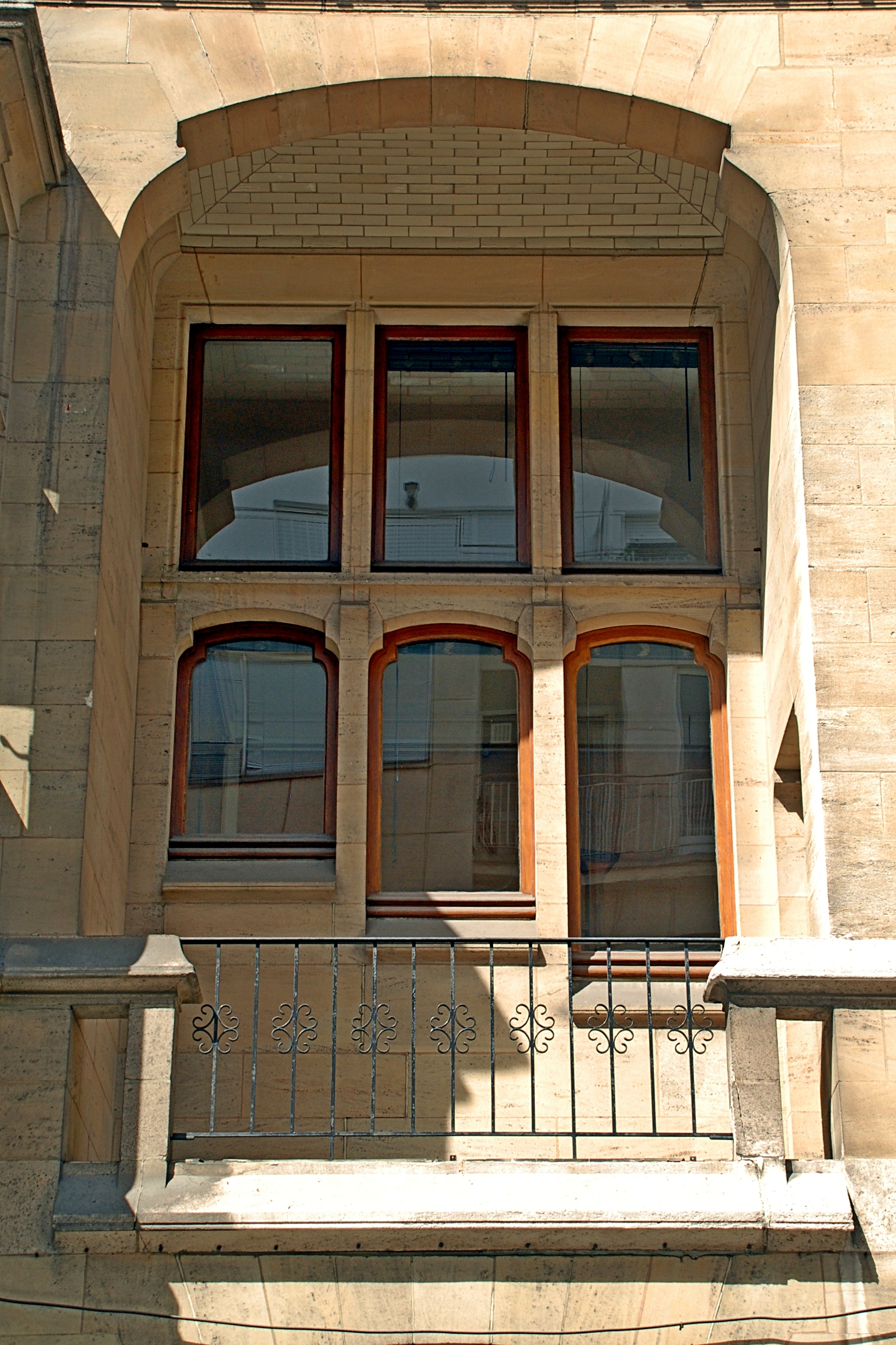
The loggia

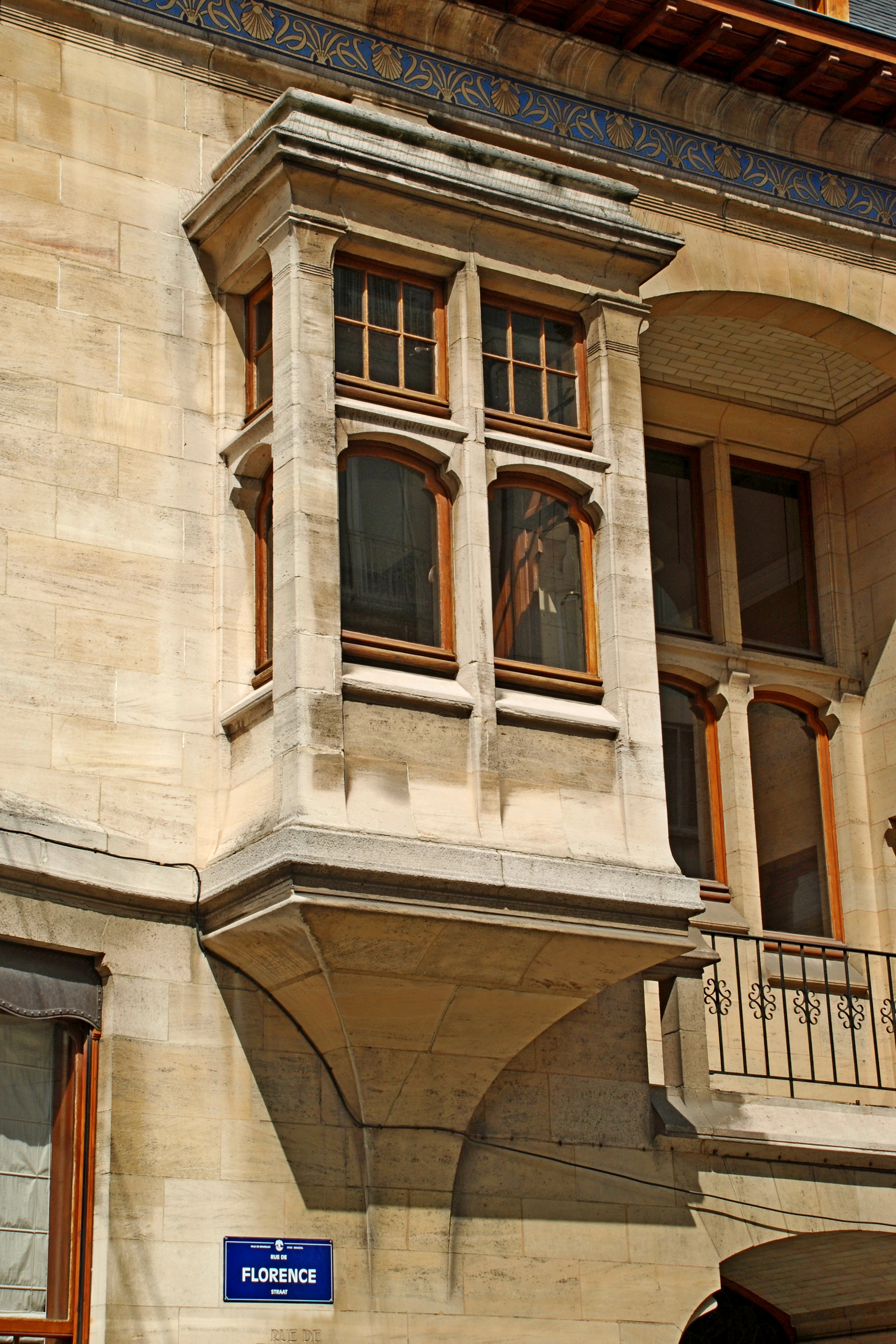
The cabin

=== Façade of the Rue de Livourne ===
The façade of the Rue de Livourne, of a "stunning variety", is just as asymmetrical as the façade of the Rue de Florence. It begins with a triangular oriel that extends from the ground floor to the first floor, to continue with a set made up of three windows surmounted by a rectangular box framed by two small balconies "in-work", and finally, to end with a double balcony supported by elegant consoles.

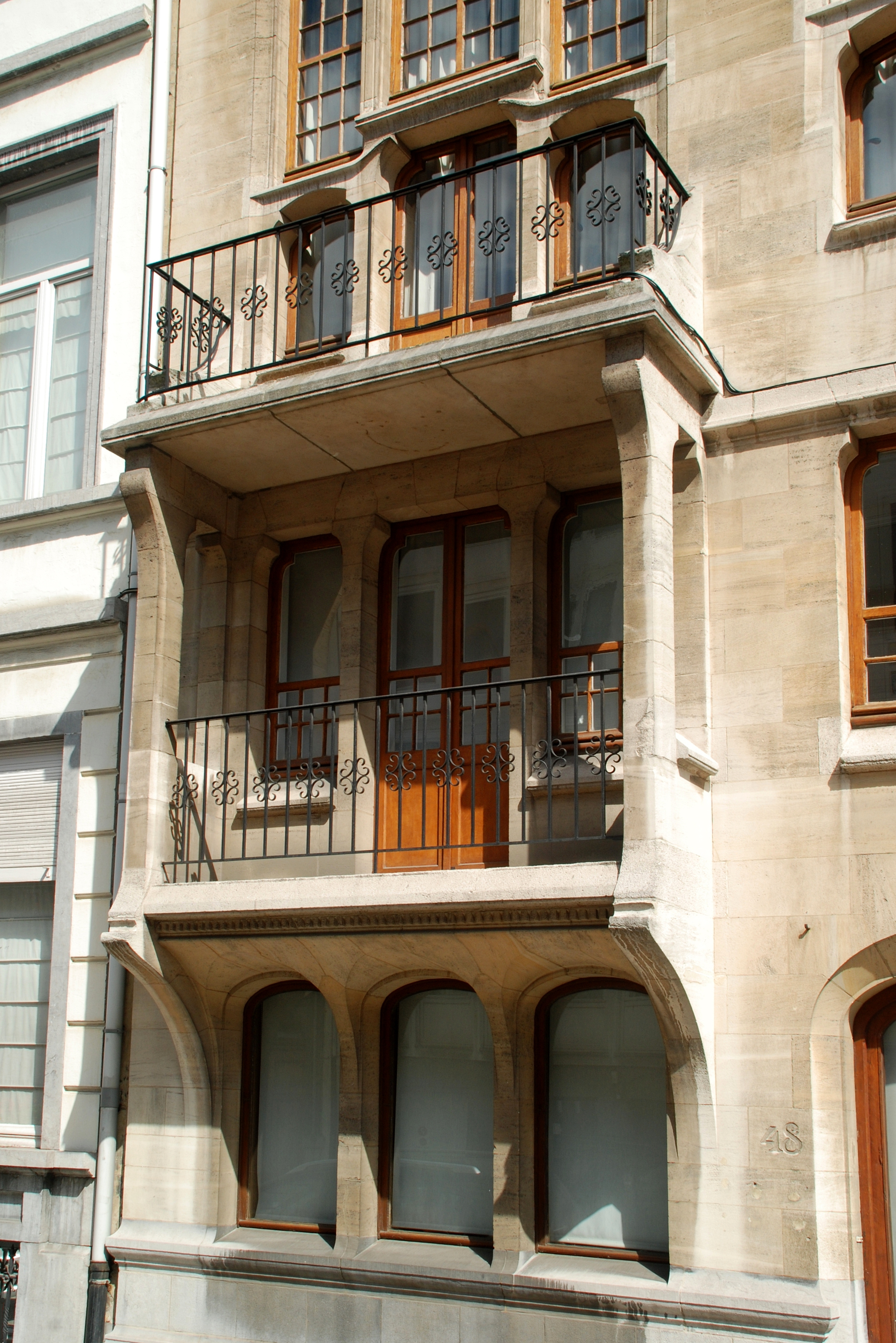
The balcony

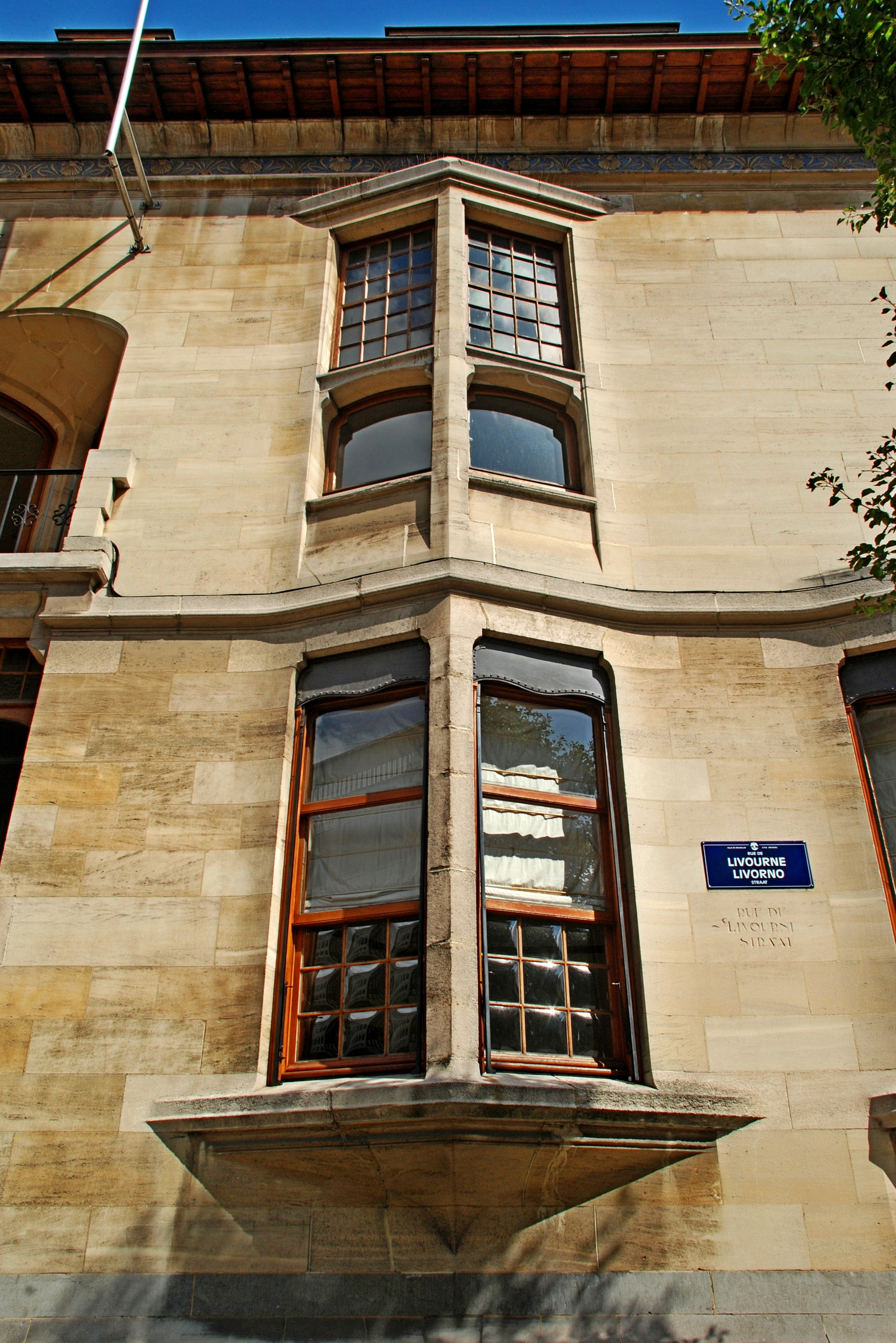
The triangular oriel

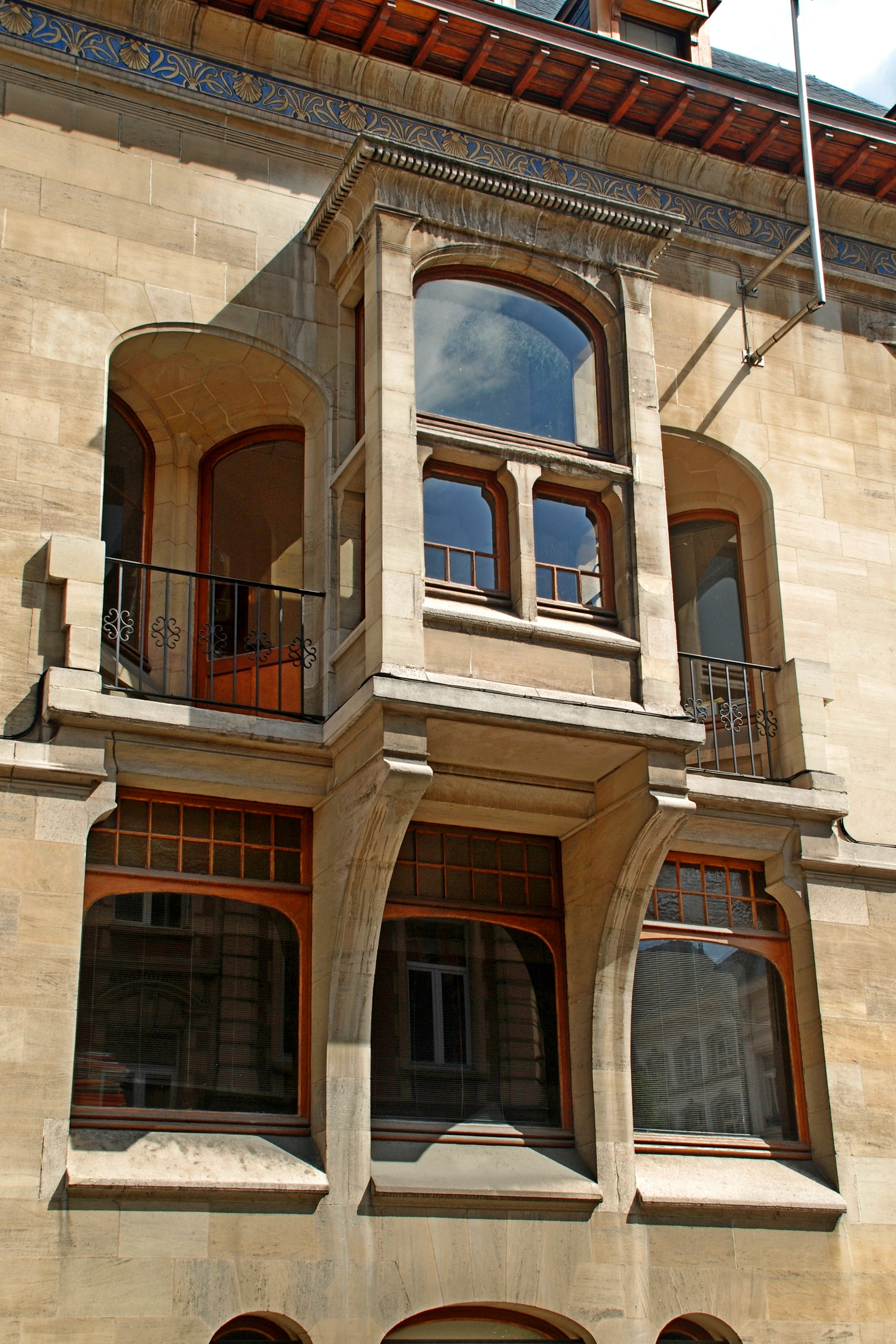
The cabin

=== Exterior decoration ===
Apart from the games of volumes mentioned above, the only ornament on the façades consists of a frieze of arabesques and scallop shells on a blue background placed under the cornice.

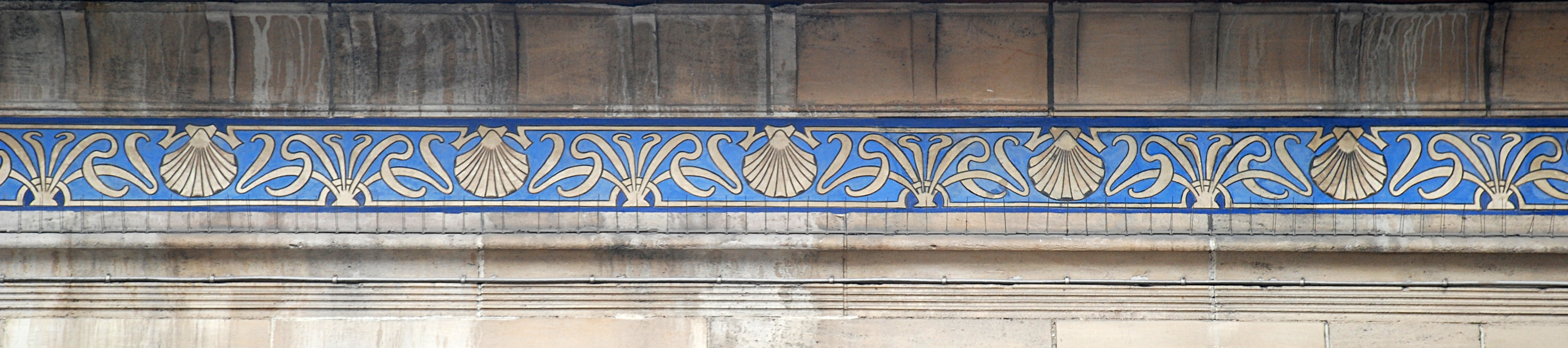
The Art Nouveau frieze under the cornice

== Interior decoration ==
The centrepiece of its interior design, a stained glass window with a floral motif separates the living room from the grand staircase while providing the latter with additional light. The architect Henry van de Velde helped with the interior decoration.

== See also ==
- Art Nouveau in Brussels
- History of Brussels
- Culture of Belgium
- Belgium in the long nineteenth century
