= Paul Otlet =

Belgian documentalist (1868–1944)

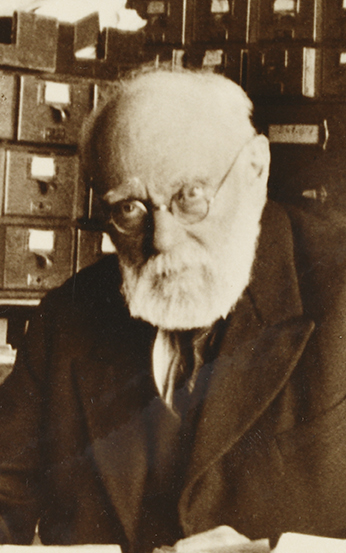
- Otlet in 1937
- Born: 23 August 1868; Brussels, Belgium
- Died: 10 December 1944 (aged 76); Brussels, Belgium
- Education: Catholic University of Leuven; Free University of Brussels
- Known for: One of several people who have been considered the founders of information science
- Scientific career
- Fields: Information science
- Workplaces: Institut International de Bibliographie (now the International Federation for Information and Documentation)

Paul Marie Ghislain Otlet (/ɒtˈleɪ/; French: [pɔl maʁi ɡilɛ̃ ɔtlɛ]; 23 August 1868 – 10 December 1944) was a Belgian bibliographer, lawyer, and peace activist, and a key figure in documentation science, a precursor to information science.

Otlet created the Universal Decimal Classification, which would later become a faceted classification. Otlet was responsible for the development of an early information retrieval tool, the "Repertoire Bibliographique Universel" (RBU). RBU was used by the International Institute of Bibliography which later became the Mundaneum. Otlet wrote numerous essays on how to collect and organize and connect knowledge, culminating in two books, the Traité de Documentation (1934) and Monde: Essai d'universalisme (1935). His ideas for information collection, storage and retrieval have been compared to early incarnations of the internet and search engines.

In 1907, following a huge international conference, Otlet and Henri La Fontaine created the Central Office of International Associations, which was renamed to the Union of International Associations in 1910, and which is still located in Brussels. They also created a great international center called at first Palais Mondial (World Palace), later, the Mundaneum to house the collections and activities of their various organizations and institutes. Otlet witnessed an unprecedented proliferation of information, resulting in the creation of new kinds of international organization.

Otlet also endorsed the internationalist politics of the League of Nations and its International Institute of Intellectual Cooperation (the forerunner of UNESCO) along with fellow Mundaneum founder La Fontaine.

== Early life and career ==
Otlet was born in Brussels, Belgium on 23 August 1868, the oldest child of Édouard Otlet (Brussels 13 June 1842-Blanquefort, France, 20 October 1907) and Maria (née Van Mons). His father, Édouard, was a wealthy businessman, selling and operating trams in the North of France. Through his mother, he was related to the Van Mons family, a prosperous family, and to the Verhaeren family, of which Emile Verhaeren was a notable Belgian poet. His mother died in 1871 at the age of 24, when Otlet was three. As a child Otlet had few friends, and only regularly played with his younger brother Maurice. He soon developed a love of reading and books.

His father kept him out of school, believing classrooms were a stifling environment. Eduoard opted to tutor the young Otlet at home during his primary schooling

At the age of six, financial hardships caused the family to move to Paris. Otlet went to school for the first time at 11. He started his formal schooling at a Jesuit school in Paris, where he stayed for the next three years. The family then returned to Brussels when Otlet was 14, and began to study at the prestigious Collège Saint-Michel in Brussels. In 1894, his father became a senator in the Belgian Senate for the Catholic Party. His father remarried to Valerie Linden, daughter of famed botanist Jean Jules Linden; the two eventually had five additional children. The family travelled often during this time, going on holidays and business trips to Italy, France and Russia.

Otlet was educated at the Catholic University of Leuven and at the Free University of Brussels. His interests at university consisted of theology, philosophy and sciences before settling on law. He earned a law degree on 15 July 1890. He married his step-cousin, Fernande Gloner, soon afterward, on 9 December 1890. He then clerked with famed lawyer Edmond Picard, a friend of his father's.

Otlet soon became dissatisfied with his legal career, and began to take an interest in bibliography. His first published work on the subject was the essay "Something about bibliography", written in 1892. In it he expressed the belief that books were an inadequate way to store information, because the arrangement of facts contained within them was an arbitrary decision on the part of the author, making individual facts difficult to locate. A better storage system, Otlet wrote in his essay, would be cards containing individual "chunks" of information, that would allow "all the manipulations of classification and continuous interfiling." In addition would be needed "a very detailed synoptic outline of knowledge" that could allow classification of all of these chunks of data.

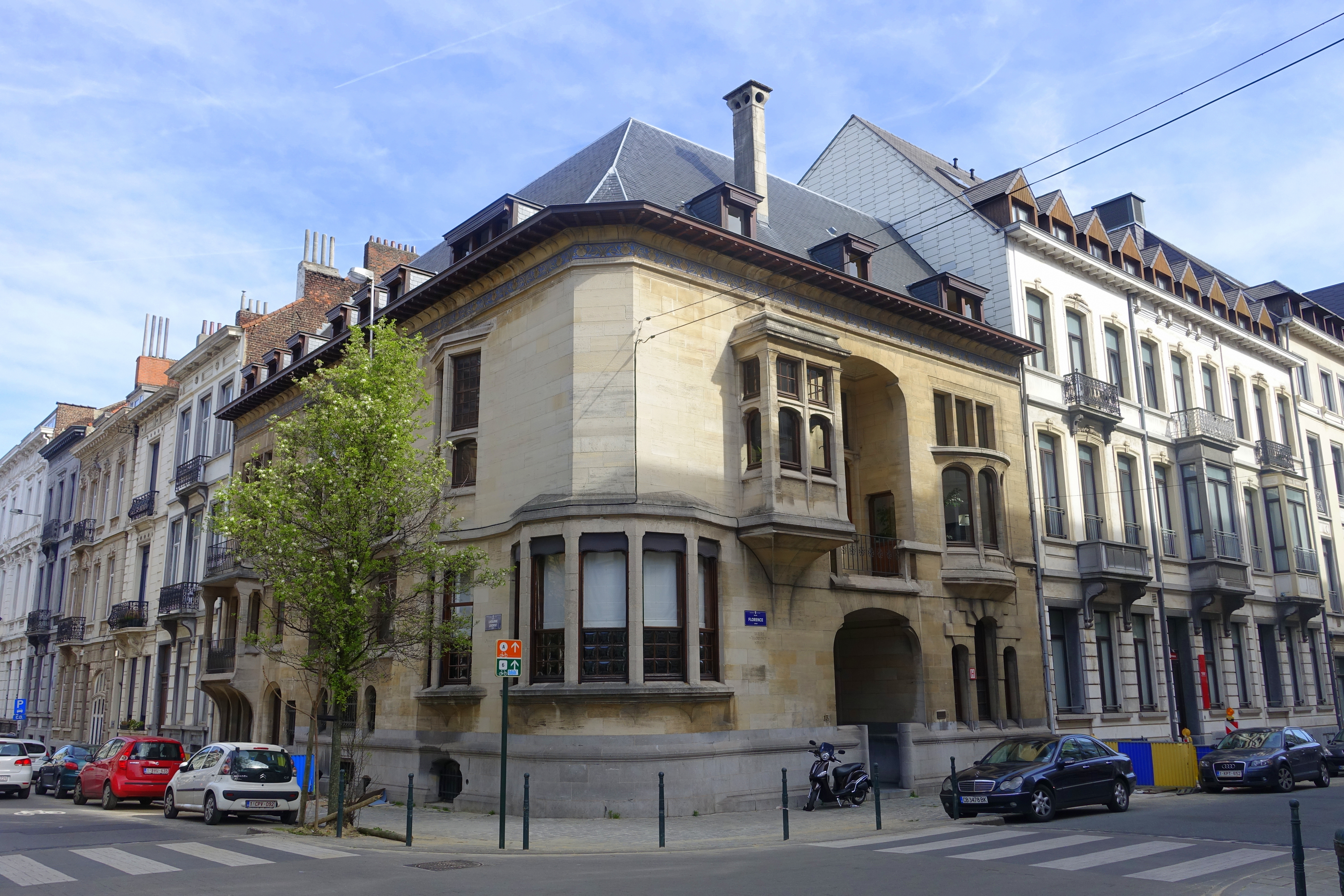
The Hotel Otlet, Paul Otlet's mansion, designed by Octave van Rysselberghe in 1894

In 1891, Otlet met Henri La Fontaine, a fellow lawyer with shared interests in bibliography and international relations, and the two became good friends. They were commissioned in 1892 by Belgium's Societé des Sciences sociales et politiques (Society of social and political sciences) to create bibliographies for various of the social sciences; they spent three years doing this. In 1895, they came across the Dewey Decimal Classification, a library classification system that had been invented in 1876 by Melvil Dewey. They decided to try to expand this system to cover the classification of facts that Otlet had previously developed. They wrote to the system's creator, asking for permission to modify his system in a way closer to Otlet's system; he agreed, so long as their system was not translated into English. They began work on this expansion soon afterwards and thus created the Universal Decimal Classification.

During this time, Otlet and his wife then had two sons, Marcel and Jean, in quick succession.

Otlet founded the Institut International de Bibliographie (IIB) in 1895 with La Fontaine after organizing the First International Conference on Bibliography together. Later renamed as (in English) the International Federation for Information and Documentation (FID). The FID was later renamed after Otlet’s death to The International Federation for Information and Documentation (Fédération Internationale d'Information et de Documentation, FID) in 1988, before eventually closing in 2002.

In 1894, he had Art Nouveau architect Octave van Rysselberghe build his mansion in Brussels, the so-called Hotel Otlet.

== The Universal Bibliographic Repertory ==
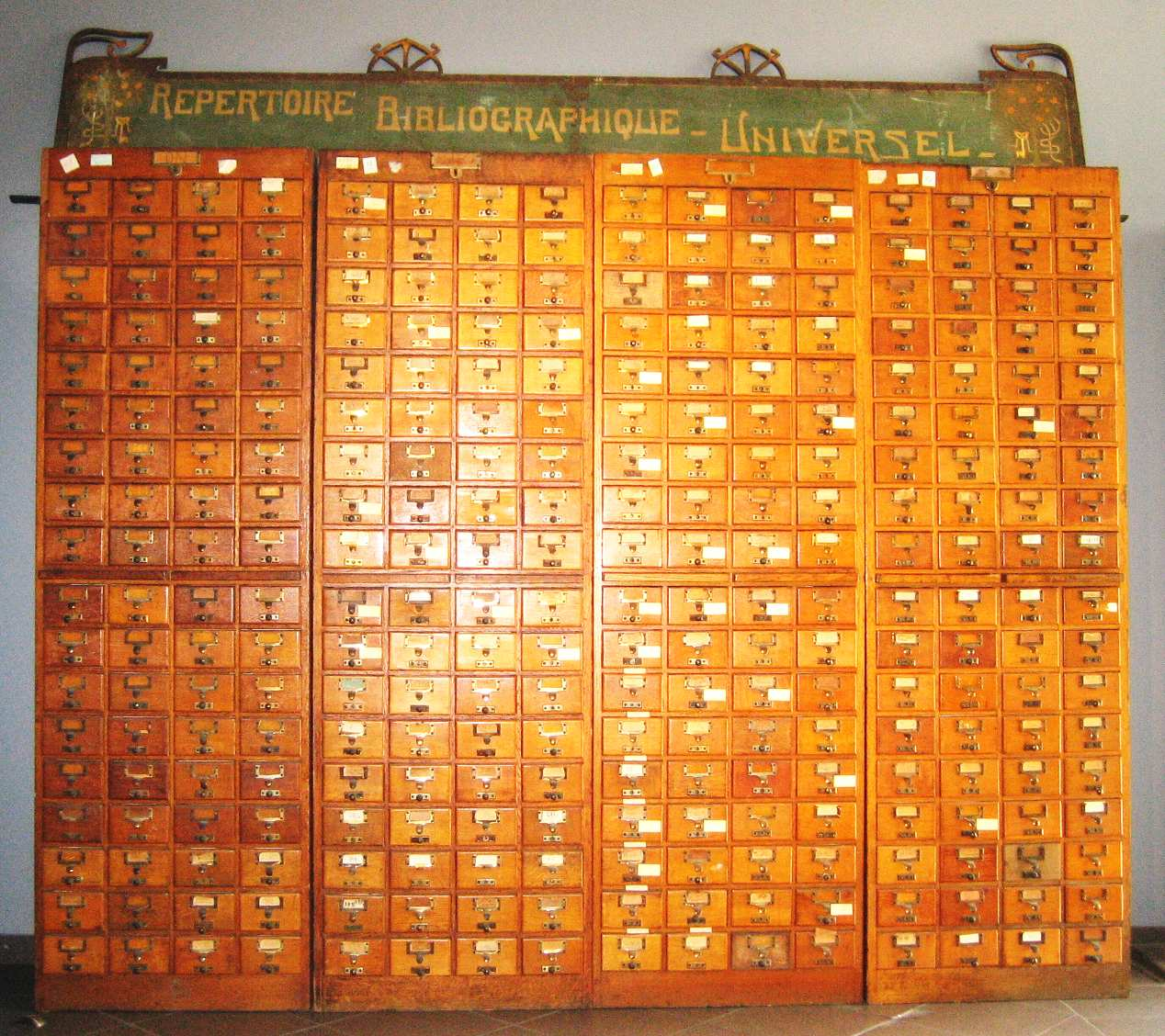
Répertoire Bibliographique Universel

In 1895, Otlet and La Fontaine also began the creation of a collection of index cards, meant to catalog facts, that came to be known as the "Repertoire Bibliographique Universel" (RBU), or the "Universal Bibliographic Repertory". By the end of 1895 it had grown to 400,000 entries; later it would reach more than 15 million entries.

In 1896, Otlet set up a fee-based service to answer questions by mail, by sending the requesters copies of the relevant index cards for each query; scholar Charles van den Heuvel has referred to the service as an "analog search engine". By 1912, this service responded to over 1,500 queries a year. Users of this service were even warned if their query was likely to produce more than 50 results per search.

Otlet envisioned a copy of the RBU in each major city around the world, with Brussels holding the master copy. At various times between 1900 and 1914, attempts were made to send full copies of the RBU to cities such as Paris, Washington, D.C. and Rio de Janeiro; however, difficulties in copying and transportation meant that no city received more than a few hundred thousand cards.

== The Universal Decimal Classification ==
In 1904, Otlet and La Fontaine began to publish their classification scheme, which they termed the Universal Decimal Classification. The UDC was originally based on Melvil Dewey's Decimal classification system. Otlet and La Fontaine contacted Melvil Dewey to inquire if they could modify the Dewey Decimal System to suit the parameters of their bibliographic project, namely, organizing information in the social and natural sciences. Dewey granted them permission as long as it substantially differed from his original version. They worked with numerous subject experts, for example with Herbert Haviland Field at the Concilium Bibliographicum for Zoology, and completed this initial publication in 1907. The system defines not only detailed subject classifications, but also an algebraic notation for referring to the intersection of several subjects; for example, the notation "31:[622+669](485)" refers to the statistics of mining and metallurgy in Sweden. The UDC is an example of an analytico-synthetic classification, i.e., it permits the linking of one concept to another. Although some have described it as faceted, it is not, though there are some faceted elements in it. A truly faceted classification consists solely of simple concepts; there are many compound concepts listed in the UDC. It is still used by many libraries and bibliographic services outside the English-speaking world, and in some non-traditional contexts such as the BBC Archives.

== Personal difficulties and World War I ==
In 1906, with his father Édouard near death and his businesses falling apart, Paul and his brother and five step-siblings formed a company, Otlet Frères ("Otlet Brothers") to try to manage these businesses, which included mines and railways. Paul, though he was consumed with his bibliographic work, became president of the company. In 1907, Édouard died, and the family struggled to maintain all parts of the business. In April 1908, Paul Otlet and his wife began divorce proceedings. Otlet remarried in 1912, to Cato Van Nederhesselt.

In 1913, La Fontaine won the Nobel Peace Prize, and invested his winnings into Otlet and La Fontaine's bibliographic ventures, which were suffering from lack of funding. Otlet journeyed to the United States in early 1914 to try to get additional funding from the U.S. Government, but his efforts soon came to a halt due to the outbreak of World War I. Otlet returned to Belgium, but quickly fled after it became occupied by the Germans; he spent the majority of the war in Paris and various cities in Switzerland. Both his sons fought in the Belgian army, and one of them, Jean, died during the war in the Battle of the Yser.

Otlet spent much of the war trying to bring about peace, and the creation of multinational institutions that he felt could avert future wars. In 1914, he published a book, "La Fin de la Guerre" ("The End of War") that defined a "World Charter of Human Rights" as the basis for an international federation.

== The Mundaneum ==
In 1910, Otlet and La Fontaine first envisioned a "city of knowledge", which Otlet originally named the "Palais Mondial" ("World Palace"), that would serve as a central repository for the world's information. In 1919, soon after the end of World War I, they convinced the government of Belgium to give them the space and funding for this project, arguing that it would help Belgium bolster its bid to house the League of Nations headquarters. They were given space in the left wing of the Palais du Cinquantenaire, a government building in Brussels. They then hired staff to help add to their Universal Bibliographic Repertory.

In 1921 Otlet wrote to W. E. B. Du Bois offering the use of the Palais Mondial for the 2nd Pan-African Congress. Although both Otlet and Fontaine offered a warm welcome to the Congress, these sentiments were not shared across all of Belgian society. The Brussels-based paper Neptune stated that the organisers – particularly the National Association for the Advancement of Coloured People were funded by the Bolsheviks – and raised concern that it might lead to difficulties in the Belgian Congo by drawing together "all the ne’er-do-wells of the various tribes of the Colony, aside from some hundreds of labourers".

The Palais Mondial was briefly shuttered in 1922, due to lack of support from the government of Prime Minister Georges Theunis, but was reopened after lobbying from Otlet and La Fontaine. Otlet renamed the Palais Mondial to the Mundaneum in 1924. The RBU steadily grew to 13 million index cards in 1927; by its final year, 1934, it had reached more than 15 million. Index cards were stored in custom-designed cabinets, and indexed according to the Universal Decimal Classification. The collection also grew to include files (including letters, reports, newspaper articles, etc.) and images, contained in separate rooms; the index cards were meant to catalog all of these as well. The Mundaneum eventually contained 100,000 files and millions of images.

The Mondothèque was a multimedia device hypothesised in the 1930s by Otlet. It was to combine books, images, maps and other media into a single search experience. It was never built, because the available technology of the time: index cards, telegraph and microfiche were not powerful enough to match the original vision.

In 1934, the Belgian government again cut off funding for the project, and the offices were closed. (Otlet protested by keeping vigil outside the locked offices, but to no avail.) The collection remained untouched within those offices, however, until 1940, when Germany invaded Belgium. Requisitioning the Mundaneum's quarters to hold a collection of Third Reich art and destroying substantial amounts of its collections in the process, the Germans forced Otlet and his colleagues to find a new home for the Mundaneum. In a large but decrepit building in Leopold Park they reconstituted the Mundaneum as best as they could, and there it remained until it was forced to move again in 1972, well after Otlet's death.

== The World City ==
The World City or Cité Mondiale is a utopian vision by Paul Otlet of a city which like a universal exhibition brings together all the leading institutions of the world. The World City would radiate knowledge to the rest of the world and construct peace and universal cooperation. Otlet’s idea to design a utopian city dedicated to international institutions was largely inspired by the contemporary publication in 1913 by the Norwegian-American sculptor Hendrik Christian Andersen and the French architect Ernest Hébrard of an impressive series of Beaux-Arts plans for a World Centre of Communication (1913). For the design of his World City, Otlet collaborated with several architects. In this way a whole series of designs for the World City was developed. The most elaborated plans were: the design of a Mundaneum (1928) and a World City (1929) by Le Corbusier in Geneva next to the palace of the League of Nations, by Victor Bourgeois in Tervuren (1931) next to the Congo Museum, again by Le Corbusier (in collaboration with Huib Hoste) on the left bank in Antwerp (1933), by Maurice Heymans in Chesapeake Bay near Washington (1935), and by Stanislas Jassinski and Raphaël Delville on the left bank in Antwerp (1941). In these different designs the program of the World City stayed more or less fixed, containing a World Museum, a World University, a World Library and Documentation Centre, Offices for the International Associations, Offices or Embassies for the Nations, an Olympic Centre, a residential area, and a park.

== Exploring new media ==
Otlet integrated new media, as they were invented, into his vision of the networked knowledge-base of the future. In the early 1900s, Otlet worked with engineer Robert Goldschmidt on storing bibliographic data on microfilm (then known as "micro-photography"). These experiments continued into the 1920s, and by the late 1920s he attempted along with colleagues to create an encyclopedia printed entirely on microfilm, known as the Encyclopaedia Microphotica Mundaneum, which was housed in the Mundaneum. In the 1920s and 1930s, he wrote about radio and television as other forms of conveying information, writing in the 1934 Traité de documentation that "one after another, marvellous inventions have immensely extended the possibilities of documentation." In the same book, he predicted that media that would convey feel, taste and smell would also eventually be invented, and that an ideal information-conveyance system should be able to handle all of what he called "sense-perception documents". He called this workstation the Mondothèque.

== Political views and involvement ==
Otlet spent much of his life advocating for international cooperation and peace. The Union of International Associations, which he had founded in 1907 with Henri La Fontaine, later participated to the development of both the League of Nations and the International Committee on Intellectual Cooperation, which was later merged with UNESCO. Otlet’s organization provided support to the 1921 Pan-African Congress at the Palais Mondial (later: Mundaneum).

Contemporary critics have raised concerns with his endeavor to catalog and classify is an expression of the commitment to the Eurocentric project to structure knowledge according to universal categories and taxonomies, of which the Universal Decimal Classification is an example.

During his lifetime Otlet published statements starting with L'Afrique Aux Noirs (1888) where he argued that White people and "Westernized" Blacks were to be tasked with civilizing Africa. Similarly, in Monde (1935), near the end of his life, Otlet claimed the biological superiority of White people. His reasoning related to historic concepts of intellectual Enlightenment through Eugenics and the White Man's Burden.

In 1933, Otlet proposed building in Belgium near Antwerp a "gigantic neutral World City" to employ a massive number of workers, in order to alleviate the unemployment generated by the Great Depression.

== Fade into obscurity ==
Otlet died in 1944, not long before the end of World War II, having seen his major project, the Mundaneum, shuttered, and having lost all his funding sources. According to Otlet scholar W. Boyd Rayward:

"The First World War marked the end of the intellectual as well as sociopolitical era in which Otlet had functioned hitherto with remarkable success. After the war, he and his schemes were never taken seriously except with the circle of his disciples. He quickly lost the support of the Belgian government. In the late 1920s he faced the defection of his followers in the International Institute of Documentation, as the International Institute of Bibliography "

And:

"Perhaps at one level, Otlet is best regarded as a fin de siècle figure whose work enjoyed a considerable measure of acceptance and support at home and abroad before World War I. But after the War, it rapidly lost favour. Once influential nationally and internationally, at least in a relatively specialised circle, Otlet came to be regarded as difficult and obstructive as he grew old. His ideas and the extraordinary institutional arrangements in which they had finally come to be expressed, the Palais Mondial or Mundaneum, seemed grandiose, unfocused and passé. In the early 1930s there was a quietly dramatic struggle to remove the International Institute of Bibliography, transformed eventually into the International Federation for Documentation, from this institutional complex and from under what was considered to be the dead hand of the past - effectively the hand of the still very much alive but ageing Otlet."

In the wake of World War II, the contributions of Otlet to the field of information science were lost sight of in the rising popularity of the ideas of American information scientists such as Vannevar Bush, Douglas Engelbart, Ted Nelson and by such theorists of information organization as Seymour Lubetzky.

== Rediscovery ==
Beginning in the 1980s, and especially after the advent of the World Wide Web in the early 1990s, new interest arose in Otlet's speculations and theories about the organization of knowledge, the use of information technologies, and globalization. His 1934 masterpiece, the Traité de documentation, was reprinted in 1989 by the Centre de Lecture publique de la Communauté française in Belgium. (Neither the Traité nor its companion work, "Monde" (World) has been translated into English so far.) In 1990 Professor W. Boyd Rayward published an English translation of some of Otlet's writings. He also published a biography of Otlet (1975) that was translated into Russian (1976) and Spanish (1996, 1999, and 2005).

In 1985, Belgian academic André Canonne raised the possibility of recreating the Mundaneum as an archive and museum devoted to Otlet and others associated with them; his idea initially was to house it in the Belgian city of Liège. Cannone, with substantial help from others, eventually managed to open the new Mundaneum in Mons, Belgium in 1998. This museum is still in operation, and contains the personal papers of Otlet and La Fontaine and the archives of the various organizations they created along with other collections important to the modern history of Belgium.

The School of Information Sciences at the University of Illinois Urbana Champaign holds a biannual lecture series honoring Otlet's career.

== Analysis of Otlet's theories ==
Otlet scholar W. Boyd Rayward has written that Otlet's thinking is a product of the 19th century and the philosophy of positivism, which holds that, through careful study and the scientific method, an objective view of the world can be gained. According to W. Boyd Rayward, his ideas placed him culturally and intellectually in the Belle Époque period of pre–World War I Europe, a period of great "cultural certitude".

Otlet's writings have sometimes been called prescient of the current World Wide Web. His vision of a great network of knowledge was centered on documents and included the notions of hyperlinks, search engines, remote access, and social networks—although these notions were described by different names. In 1934, Otlet laid out this vision of the computer and internet in what he called "Radiated Library" vision.

== Grave ==
Paul Otlet's grave is located in the Etterbeek Cemetery, in Wezembeek-Oppem, Flemish Brabant, Belgium.

== See also ==
=== People ===
- Suzanne Briet
- Ada Lovelace
- Andries van Dam
- Conrad Gessner
- Douglas Engelbart
- George Dyson
- Henri La Fontaine
- Herbert Haviland Field
- J.C.R. Licklider
- Ted Nelson
- Tim Berners-Lee
- Vannevar Bush
- W. Boyd Rayward

=== Ideas ===
- As We May Think
- External memory
- Global brain
- Hypermedia
- Hypertext
- Intelligence amplification
- Memex
- Project Xanadu
- Victorian Internet
- World Brain
- World Wide Web

=== Fields of study ===
- Bibliography
- Documentation science
- Information science
- Knowledge organization
- Library and information science

== Bibliography ==
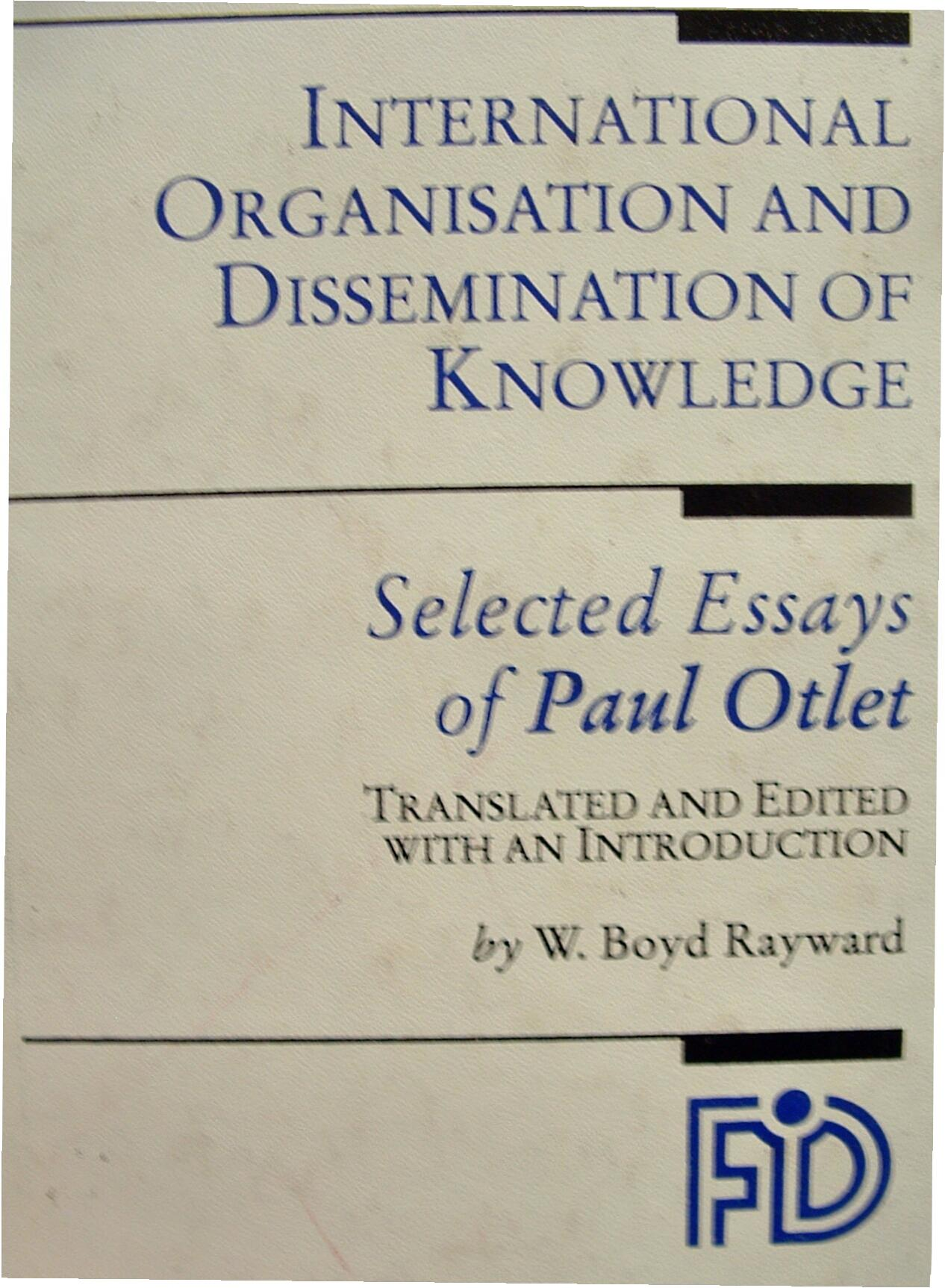
Front page of the book International Organisation and Dissemination of Knowledge: Selected Essays of Paul Otlet, edited by W. Boyd Rayward

- Day, Ronald E. “Documents from Head to Toe: Bodies of Knowledge in the Works of Paul Otlet and Georges Bataille,” Library Trends 66 (Winter 2018): 395-408.
- Ducheyne, Steffen, "Paul Otlet's Theory of Knowledge and Linguistic Objectivism", in Knowledge Organization, no 32, 2005, pp. 110–116.
- Heuvel, Charles van den, "Building Society, Constructing Knowledge, Weaving the Web". in European Modernism and the Information Society – Informing the Present, Understanding the Past, Aldershot, 2008, pp. 127–153.
- Judge, Anthony, “Union of International Associations – Virtual Organization – Paul Otlet's 100-year Hypertext Conundrum?”, 2001.
- Levie, Françoise, L’homme qui voulait classer le monde. Paul Otlet et le Mundaneum, Bruxelles, Les Impressions Nouvelles, 2006.
- Manfroid S J Gillen and P. M Phillips-Batoma. 2013. The Archives of Paul Otlet: Between Appreciation and Rediscovery 1944–2013. Baltimore: Johns Hopkins University.
- Otlet, Paul, Traité de documentation, Bruxelles, Mundaneum, Palais Mondial, 1934.
- Otlet, Paul, Monde, essai d'universalisme, Bruxelles, Mundaneum, 1935.
- Rayward, Warden Boyd (1975). "The Universe of Information: the Work of Paul Otlet for Documentation and international Organization". Fid520. FID Publication 520, Moscow, International Federation for Documentation by the All-Union Institute for Scientific and Technical Information (Viniti). hdl:2142/651.
- Popova, Maria, “The Birth of the Information Age: How Paul Otlet’s Vision for Cataloging and Connecting Humanity Shaped Our World”, Brain Pickings, 2014.
- Rayward, Warden Boyd, Universum informastsii Zhizn' i deiatl' nost' Polia Otle, Trans. R.S. Giliarevesky, Moscow, VINITI, 1976.
- Rayward, Warden Boyd, Otlet, Paul, International Organization and Dissemination of Knowledge: Selected Essays, Amsterdam, Elsevier, 1990.
- Sánchez, Zurita, Manuel, Juan, El paradigma otletiano como base de un modelo para la organización y difusión del conocimiento científico, México, El Author, Tesina, Colegio de Bibliotecología, Facultad de Filosofía y Letras, UNAM, 2001.
- Rayward, Warden Boyd, El Universo de la Documentacion: la obra de Paul Otlet sobra documentacion y organizacion internacional, Trans. Pilar Arnau Rived, Madrid, Mundarnau, 2005.
- Van Acker, Wouter, “Internationalist Utopias of Visual Education. The Graphic and Scenographic Transformation of the Universal Encyclopaedia in the Work of Paul Otlet, Patrick Geddes, and Otto Neurath”, in Perspectives on Science, Vol.19, nr.1, 2011, p. 32-80.
- Van Acker, Wouter, "Universalism as Utopia. A Historical Study of the Schemes and Schemas of Paul Otlet (1868–1944)”, Unpublished PhD Dissertation, University Press, Zelzate, 2011.
- Van Acker, Wouter, Somsen, Geert, "A Tale of Two World Capitals – the Internationalisms of Pieter Eijkman and Paul Otlet", in Revue Belge de Philologie et d'Histoire/Belgisch Tijdschrift voor Filologie en Geschiedenis, Vol. 90, nr.4, 2012.
- Wright, Alex, Cataloging the World: Paul Otlet and the Birth of the Information Age, Oxford University Press, 2014.
- Wright, Alex, “Forgotten Forefather”, in Boxes & Arrows, 10 November 2003.
- Wright, Alex, Glut: Mastering Information Through the Ages, Washington D.C., Joseph Henry Press, 2007.
- Wright, Alex, "Paul Otlet and the Birth of the Information Age", Oxford, Oxford University Press, 2014, 384 pages.
- Wright, Alex, The Web Time Forgot, The New York Times, 17 June 2008.

== Documentary films ==
- Alle Kennis van de Wereld (Biography of Paul Otlet), documentary narrated by W. Boyd Rayward, Otlet’s biographer, in English and French, produced for Dutch television in 1998.
- Levie, Françoise, The Man Who Wanted to Classify the World, DVD, duration 60 minutes, Memento Production, 2006.
- Wright, Alex, The Web That Wasn't: Forgotten Forebears of the Internet, UX Brighton, 2012.
- Snelting, Femke, Fathers of the Internet, Verbindingen/Jonctions 14 – "Are You Being Served?”, December 2013.
- Rayward, Warden Boyd, Biography of Paul Otlet (YouTube, 23:20)

== Web pages ==
- Buckland, Michael, Paul Otlet, Pioneer of Information Management.
- Rayward, Warden Boyd, Bibliography of the works of Paul Otlet.

== Other projects on Paul Otlet’s work ==
- Theater Adhoc, The Humor and Tragedy of Completeness, on the occasion of the conference on European Modernism and the Information Society – Informing the Present, Understanding the Past, at the Graduate School of Library and Information Science of the University of Illinois Urbana-Champaign, 6–8 May 2005.
