= W. Boyd Rayward =

Australian librarian and scholar

Warden Boyd Rayward is an Australian librarian and scholar, best known as the biographer of Paul Otlet.

== Life ==
Rayward was born in Inverell, New South Wales, Australia in 1939 and studied Library Science at the University of New South Wales, graduating in 1964. He then transferred to the U.S. to continue his studies at the University of Illinois. He later earned a master's degree and doctorate in 1973 from the University of Chicago Graduate Library School. His dissertation was on Paul Otlet.

== Career ==
Rayward was a member of the faculty of Information Sciences at the University of New South Wales from 1993 to 1999 and was appointed Professor Emeritus in 1999. He also worked as a teacher and researcher at several North American universities, including the University of Chicago (where he was dean from 1980 to 1986) and the University of Western Ontario. He is also a member or fellow of numerous professional associations like the American Library Association (ALA), the Australian Library and Information Association (ALIA) and the American Society for Information Science and Technology (ASIST).

His writing includes Mundaneum: Archives of knowledge, "The Origins of Information Science and the International Institute of Bibliography/International Federation for Information and Documentation (FID)", "Libraries in Times of War, Revolution, and Social Change". Rayward's influence as a professor who formulated theoretical frameworks and a broader understanding of the library as a cultural agent has been documented by Michael Buckland.
