= Mundaneum =

Institution aimed to gather together all the world's knowledge founded in 1910

Coordinates: 50°27′27.67″N 3°57′19.62″E

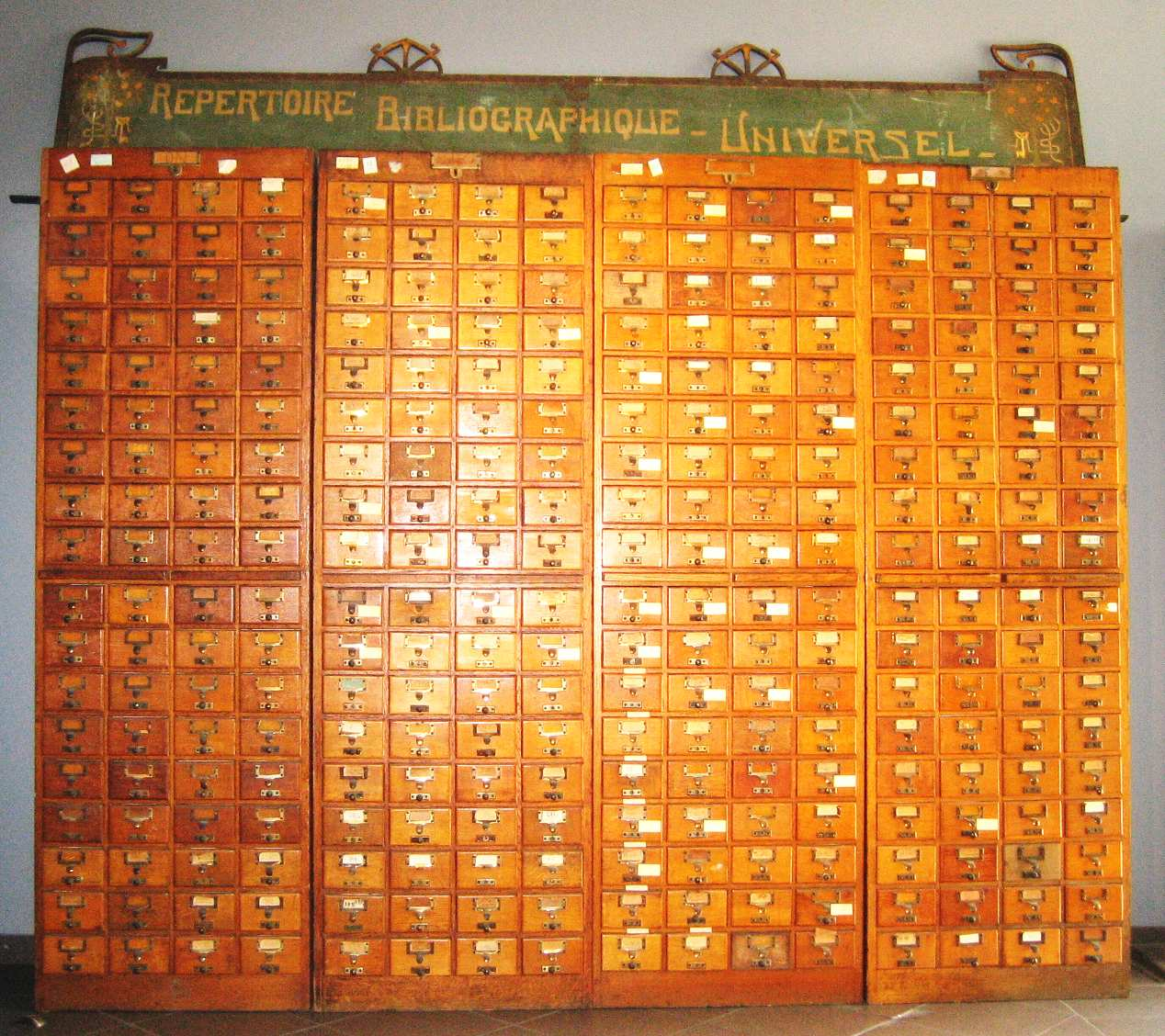
Drawers of the Mundaneum's Universal Bibliographical System bibliographic index cards

The Mundaneum was an institution that aimed to gather together all the world's knowledge and classify it according to a system known as the Universal Decimal Classification. It was developed at the turn of the 20th century by Belgian lawyers Paul Otlet and Henri La Fontaine. The Mundaneum has been identified as a milestone in the history of data collection and management, and, albeit more tenuously, as a precursor to the Internet.

In the 21st century, the Mundaneum is a non-profit organisation based in Mons, Belgium, that runs an exhibition space, website, and archive, which celebrate the legacy of the original Mundaneum.

== History ==
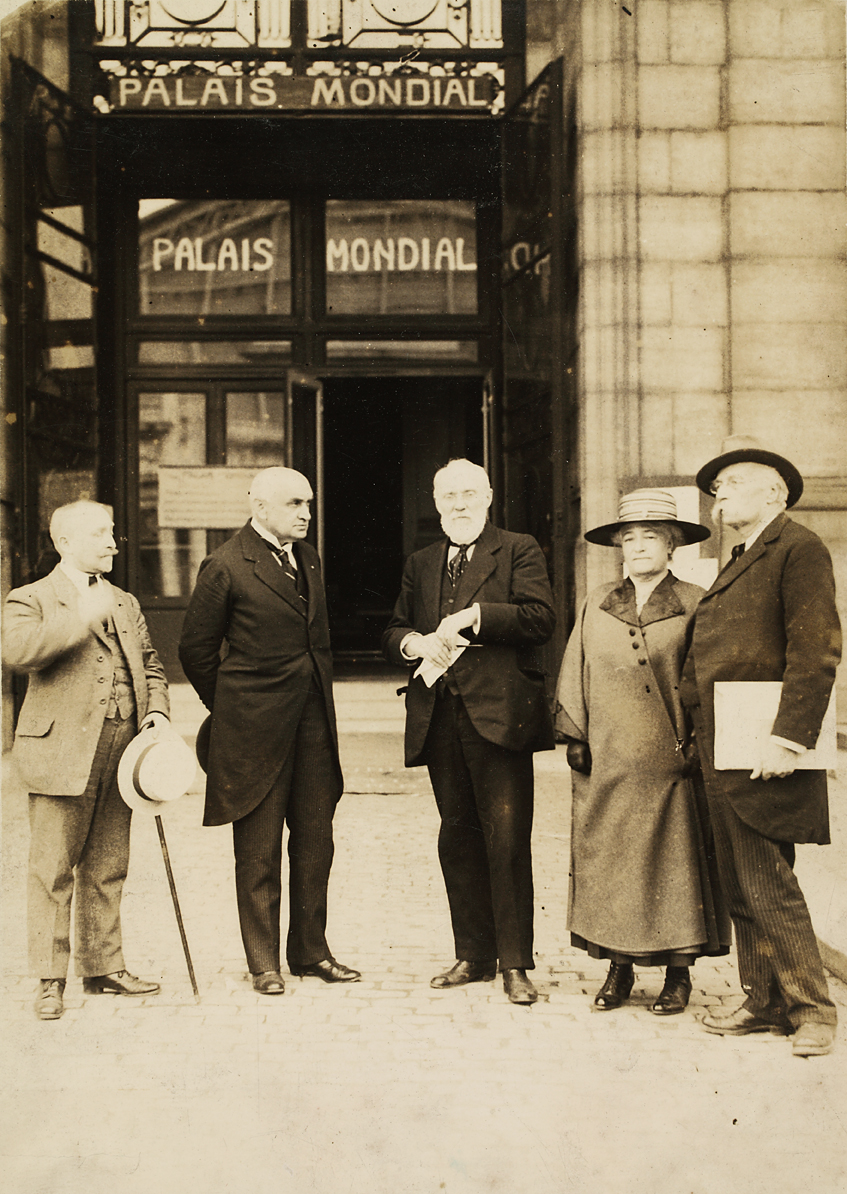
Paul Otlet, Henri La Fontaine, and his wife Mathilde Lhoest in front of the Palais Mondial at the Cinquantenaire in Brussels

The Mundaneum was created in 1910, following an initiative begun in 1895 by Belgian lawyers Paul Otlet and Henri La Fontaine, as part of their work on documentation science. Otlet first called it the Palais Mondial ("World Palace"), and it occupied the left wing of the Cinquantenaire Palace, a government building in Brussels. Otlet and La Fontaine organized an International Conference of International Associations, which was the origin of the Union of International Associations (UIA).

Otlet regarded the project as the centrepiece of a new "world city"—a centrepiece, which eventually became an archive with more than 12 million index cards and documents. Some consider it a forerunner of the Internet (or, perhaps more appropriately, of systematic knowledge projects such as Wikipedia and WolframAlpha), and Otlet himself had dreams that one day, somehow, all the information he collected could be accessed by people from the comfort of their own homes.

An English pamphlet published in 1914 described it:

The International Centre organises collections of world-wide importance. These collections are the International Museum, the International Library, the International Bibliographic Catalogue and the Universal Documentary Archives. These collections are conceived as parts of one universal body of documentation, as an encyclopedic survey of human knowledge, as an enormous intellectual warehouse of books, documents, catalogues and scientific objects. Established according to standardised methods, they are formed by assembling cooperative everything that the participating associations may gather or classify. Closely consolidated and coordinated in all of their parts and enriched by duplicates of all private works wherever undertaken, these collections will tend progressively to constitute a permanent and complete representation of the entire world (Union of International Associations, 1914, p. 116).

Otlet created plans for a "réseau" or network of "electric telescopes" in 1934 to allow people to search through a large quantity of interlinked documents. His diagrams show a device called a Mondothèque which was to access a network of connected libraries and resources. His idea included the ability to send messages between researchers and to create virtual communities. Too early for computers, his plan made use of physical cards and telegraphs.

The Mundaneum was originally housed at the Cinquantenaire Palace in Brussels. This was originally renamed Palais Mondial, before the name Mundaneum was adopted. Otlet commissioned architect Le Corbusier to design a Mundaneum project to be built in Geneva in 1929. Although never built, the project triggered the Mundaneum Affair, a theoretical argument between Corbusier and Czech critic and architect Karel Teige.

In 1933, with Otlet's agreement, Otto Neurath founded the Mundaneum Institute as a branch in The Hague in 1933, which became central to his activities when he moved to the Netherlands as a refugee following the defeat of the Austrian Social Democratic Party in the Austrian Civil War. In 1936, the Mundaneum Institute launched the International Encyclopedia of Unified Science.

=== Later years and museum ===
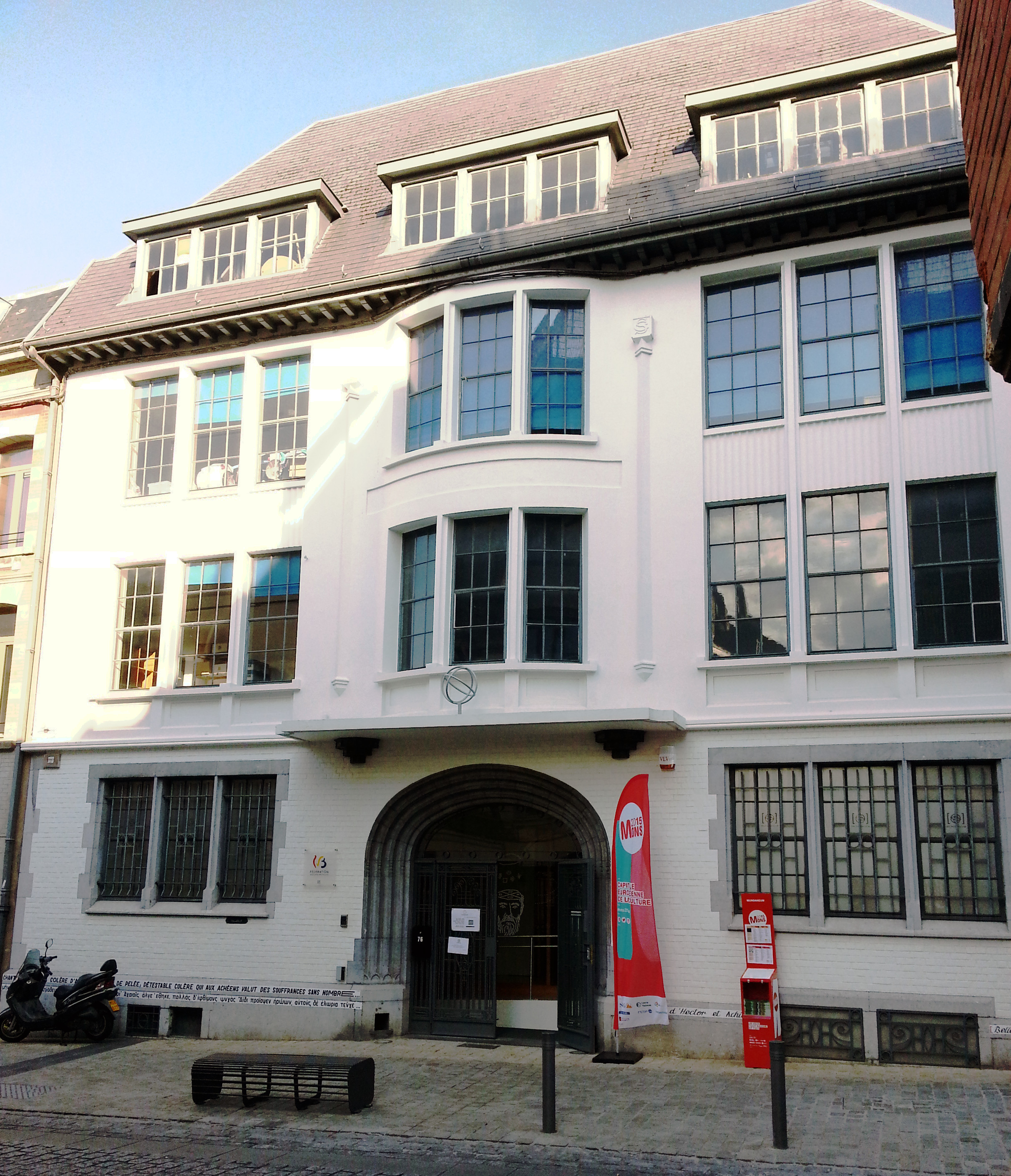
Entrance of the current Mundaneum (Mons, Belgium)

When Nazi Germany invaded Belgium in 1940, they sent their cultural task force to the Palais Mondial. They were confused, recording “It is some sort of museum for the whole world”. But they still destroyed 63 tons of books, and other documents. The Mundaneum was replaced with an exhibit of Third Reich art. The Mundaneum was reconstituted in a large but decrepit building in Leopold Park. It remained there until it was forced to move again in 1972.

The Mundaneum has since been relocated to a converted 1930s department store in Mons (Wallonia), where the existing museum opened in 1998.

On August 23, 2015, a Google Doodle depicting the Mundaneum filing cabinets was released. The Doodle was meant to pay tribute to the creators of the Mundaneum as pioneers of open information.

On Android phones, "The Mundaneum App offers visitors 3 experiences that delve into its rich and influential including 'The Origins of the Internet in Europe', the '100th Anniversary of a Nobel Peace Prize', and 'Mapping Knowledge'."

== Media ==
The story of the Mundaneum, including its founding and subsequent replacement by Nazi Germany, is the subject of the book Mundaneum by Mel Croucher.

== See also ==
- "As We May Think", an essay by Vannevar Bush
- History of libraries
- Information science
- Mondothèque, Otlet's vision for a connected workstation
- OCLC, the world's largest library network
- Project Xanadu, the first hypertext system, founded in 1960
- WorldCat, the world's largest bibliographic database

People

- Paul Otlet (1868–1944)
- Vannevar Bush (1890–1974)
- Fred Kilgour (1914–2006)
- J.C.R. Licklider (1915–1990)
- Douglas Engelbart (1925–2013)
- Ted Nelson (1937– )
- Andries van Dam (1938– )
- Tim Berners-Lee (1955– )

Ideas

- External memory (psychology)
- Hypermedia
- Hypertext
- Intelligence amplification
- Memex
- Office of the future
- Victorian Internet, term coined to describe advanced 19th-century telecommunications technologies such as the telegraph
- World Wide Web

== Sources ==
- Rayward's Otlet Page: Paul Otlet and Documentation
- Mundaneum at Google Cultural Institute
- World of Learning and a Virtual Library Barry James, International Herald Tribune, June 27, 1998.
- The Web that time forgot Alex Wright, The New York Times, June 17, 2008.
- Architectures of Global Knowledge: The Mundaneum and the World Wide Web Charles van den Heuvel, Destination Library 15, 2008.
- Long Before the Internet: The Mundaneum, Cerebral Boinkfest website, January 19, 2011, retrieved from cerebralboinkfest.blogspot.ca on October 23, 2012: a weblog page outlining the Mundaneum's history.
- Dennis Pohl, „The Smart City – City of Knowledge“, in: Mondothèque: A Radiated Book / Un livre irradiant / Een irradiërend boek, Brüssel: Constant 2016, S. 235-244, ISBN 978-9-08114-595-4.
