= Outline of Earth science =

Overview of and topical guide to Earth science

The following outline is provided as an overview of and topical guide to Earth science:

Diagram of the structure of the Earth including its atmosphere

Earth science – all-embracing term for the sciences related to the planet Earth. It is also known as geoscience, the geosciences or the Earthquake sciences, and is arguably a special case in planetary science, the Earth being the only known life-bearing planet.

Earth science is a branch of the physical sciences which is a part of the natural sciences. It in turn has many branches.

== Earth's spheres ==
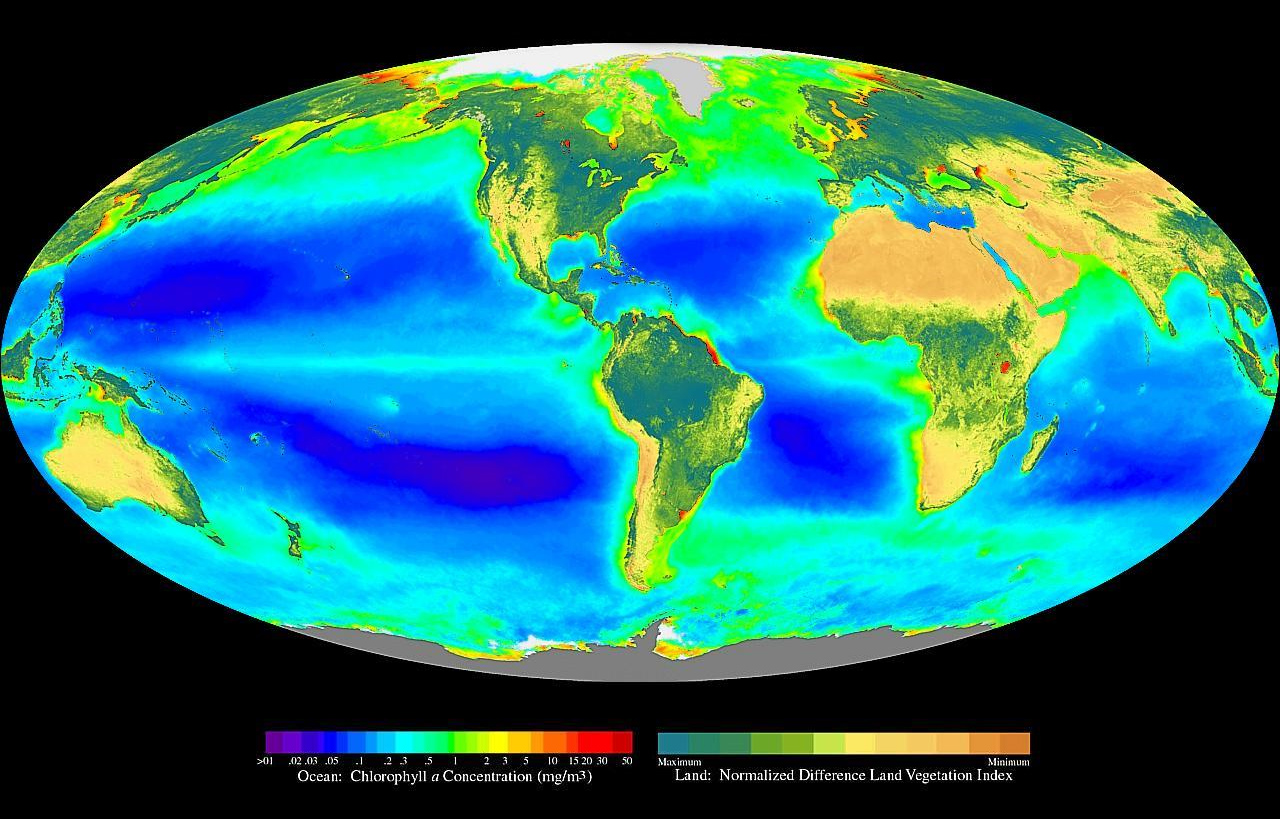
A false-color composite of global oceanic and terrestrial photoautotroph abundance from September 1997 to August 2000, showing Earth's biosphere. Provided by the SeaWiFS Project, NASA/Goddard Space Flight Center and ORBIMAGE.

Ecosphere – there are many subsystems that make up the natural environment (the planetary ecosystem or "ecosphere") of the Earth. Many of the subsystems are characterized as "spheres", coinciding with the shape of the planet. The four spheres (for which most of the other spheres are a subtype of) are the atmosphere, the biosphere, the hydrosphere and the geosphere. Earth's ecosphere lies it self within the heliosphere (the Sun's astrosphere). Listed roughly from outermost to innermost the named spheres of the Earth are:

- Magnetosphere – The region around an astronomical object in which charged particles are affected by its magnetic field
- Atmosphere, the gases that surround the Earth (its air)
  - By altitude
    - Exosphere – The outermost layer of an atmosphere
    - Exobase – The lower boundary of the exosphere
    - Thermopause – The upper boundary of the thermosphere
    - Thermosphere – The layer of the atmosphere above the mesosphere and below the exosphere
    - Mesopause – The temperature minimum at the boundary between the mesosphere and the thermosphere
    - Mesosphere – The layer of the atmosphere directly above the stratosphere and below the thermosphere
    - Stratopause – The upper boundary of the stratosphere
    - Stratosphere – The layer of the atmosphere above the troposphere
      - Ozone layer – The region of Earth's stratosphere that absorbs most of the Sun's UV radiation
    - Tropopause – The boundary of the atmosphere between the troposphere and stratosphere
    - Troposphere – The lowest layer of the atmosphere
    - Planetary boundary layer – The lowest part of the atmosphere, directly influenced by contact with the planetary surface
  - By air turbulence
    - Heterosphere – Upper parts of the atmosphere in which the component gases are not well mixed
    - Turbopause – The altitude in the Earth's atmosphere below which turbulent mixing dominates
    - Homosphere – Lower parts of the atmosphere in which the component gases are well mixed
  - Other
    - Ionosphere – The ionized part of Earth's upper atmosphere
- Biosphere – The global sum of all ecosystems on Earth
  - Anthroposphere – The part of the environment that is made or modified by humans for use in human activities and human habitat
    - Noosphere (rare) – The sphere of human thought
- Hydrosphere – The combined mass of water found on, under, and above the surface of a planet, minor planet or natural satellite
  - Cryosphere – Those portions of Earth's surface where water is in solid form
- Geosphere/Solid Earth – (Also sometimes a collective name for the lithosphere, the hydrosphere, the cryosphere, and the atmosphere) The union of all solid parts of Earth and the Inner of Earth.
  - Pedosphere – The outermost layer of the Earth that is composed of soil and subject to soil formation processes
  - Outer layers
    - By composition
      - Crust (geology) – The outermost solid shell of a rocky planet, dwarf planet, or natural satellite.
      - Moho Discontinuity– The line between the crust and the Earth's mantle.
      - Earth's mantle – The part of the interior of the planet Earth between the crust and the core.
    - By diffusion of seismic waves
      - Lithosphere – The rigid, outermost shell of a terrestrial-type planet or natural satellite that is defined by its rigid mechanical properties.
      - Asthenosphere – The highly viscous, mechanically weak and ductile region of the Earth's upper mantle
      - Mesozone – The part of the Earth's mantle below the lithosphere and the asthenosphere, but above the outer core.
  - Gutenberg discontinuity– The line between the mantle and the Earth's core.
  - Earth's core – The inner part of the planet, formed by differential buoyancy of the component materials causing the denser materials to accumulate nearer to the centre.
    - Outer core – A fluid layer composed of mostly iron and nickel between Earth's solid inner core and its mantle.
    - Lehmann Discontinuity – The line between the inner core and the outer core.
    - Inner core – The innermost part of the Earth, a solid ball of iron-nickel alloy.

== Branches of Earth science ==
=== Atmospheric science ===
Atmospheric science – The study of the atmosphere, its processes, and interactions with other systems

- Atmospheric chemistry – The branch of atmospheric science in which the chemistry of the atmosphere is studied
- Atmospheric physics – The application of physics to the study of the atmosphere
- Climatology – The scientific study of climate, defined as weather conditions averaged over a period of time
- Meteorology – Interdisciplinary scientific study of the atmosphere focusing on weather forecasting.
- Paleoclimatology – The study of changes in climate taken on the scale of the entire history of Earth
- Paleotempestology – The study of past tropical cyclone activity using geological proxies and historical documents

=== Geology ===
- Geology – The study of the composition, structure, physical properties, and history of Earth's components, and the processes by which they are shaped.
  - Economic geology – Science concerned with earth materials of economic value
  - Engineering geology – The application of the geology to engineering practice.
  - Environmental geology – Science of the practical application of geology in environmental problems.
  - Quaternary geology – The branch of geology that studies developments more recent than 2.6 million years ago
  - Planetary geology – The geology of astronomical objects apparently in orbit around stellar objects
  - Petroleum geology – The study of the origin, occurrence, movement, accumulation, and exploration of hydrocarbon fuels
  - Historical geology – The study of the geological history of Earth
  - Hydrogeology – The study of the distribution and movement of groundwater
  - Structural geology – The science of the description and interpretation of deformation in the Earth's crust independent of extent
- Geochemistry – Science that applies chemistry to analyse geological systems
- Geochronology – Science of determining the age of rocks, sediments and fossils
- Geodesy – The science of the geometric shape, orientation in space, and gravitational field of the Earth
- Geomagnetics – Study of the Earth's magnetic field
- Geomicrobiology – Science of the interactions between microbiology and geology
- Geomorphology – The scientific study of landforms and the processes that shape them
- Geophysics – The physics of the Earth and its environment in space, and the study of the Earth using quantitative physical methods
- Micropaleontology – The branch of paleontology that studies microfossils
- Mineralogy – Scientific study of minerals and mineralised artifacts
  - Gemology – Science dealing with natural and artificial gemstone materials
  - Mineral physics – The science of materials that compose the interior of planets
- Paleontology – Scientific study of prehistoric life
- Palynology – The study of dust
- Petrology – The branch of geology that studies the origin, composition, distribution and structure of rocks
- Physical geodesy – The study of the physical properties of the Earth's gravity field
- Sedimentology – The study of natural sediments and of the processes by which they are formed
- Seismology – The scientific study of earthquakes and propagation of elastic waves through a planet
  - Paleoseismology – The study of earthquakes that happened in the past
- Stratigraphy – The study of rock layers and their formation
- Volcanology – The study of volcanoes, lava, magma and associated phenomena

=== Physical geography ===
Physical geography – The branch of natural science which deals with the study of processes and patterns in the natural environment such as the atmosphere, hydrosphere, biosphere, and geosphere, as opposed to the cultural or built environment, the domain of human geography

- Biogeography – The study of the distribution of species and ecosystems in geographic space and through geological time
- Cartography – The study and practice of creating, producing, and interpreting maps
- Climatology – The scientific study of climate, defined as weather conditions averaged over a period of time
- Edaphology – The science concerned with the influence of soils on living things
- Environmental chemistry – The scientific study of the chemical and biochemical phenomena that occur in natural places
- Environmental soil science – The study of the interaction of humans with the pedosphere as well as critical aspects of the biosphere, the lithosphere, the hydrosphere, and the atmosphere
- Geographic information science – Scientific study of geographic data and information
- Geomorphology – The scientific study of landforms and the processes that shape them
- Geostatistics – A branch of statistics focusing on spatial data sets
- Glaciology – Glaciology is the study of glaciers, or more generally ice and natural phenomena that involve ice
- Global Navigation Satellite Systems (GNSS) – Various satellite navigation systems
- Hydrology – The science of applying engineering techniques to the properties of the Earth's water, especially its movement in relation to land
- Pedology – The study of soils in their natural environment
- Photogrammetry – The science of making measurements using photography
- Remote sensing – Acquisition of information at a significant distance from the subject.
- Satellite navigation – Any system that uses satellite radio signals to provide. autonomous geo-spatial positioning
- Spatial decision support systems – Computerised aid to land use decisions
- Topography – The precise, detailed study of the surface features of a region

=== Oceanography ===
Oceanography – The study of the physical and biological aspects of the ocean

- Biological oceanography – The study of how organisms affect and are affected by the physics, chemistry, and geology of the oceanographic system
- Physical oceanography – The study of physical conditions and physical processes within the ocean
- Chemical oceanography – The study of ocean chemistry
- Paleoceanography – The study of the history of the oceans in the geologic past
- Marine geology – The study of the history and structure of the ocean floor

=== Planetary science ===
Planetary science – The study of planets (including Earth), moons, and planetary systems (in particular those of the Solar System) and the processes that form them

- Planetary geology – study of the geology of astronomical objects apparently in orbit around stellar objects
- Selenography – study of the surface and physical features of the Moon
- Theoretical planetology – the theoretical study of the internal structure of planets by making assumptions about their chemical composition and the state of their materials, then calculating the radial distribution of various properties such as temperature, pressure, or density of material across the planet's internals

== History of Earth science ==
History of Earth science – history of the all-embracing sciences related to Earth. Earth science and all of its branches are branches of physical science.

- History of atmospheric sciences – history of the umbrella study of the atmosphere, its processes, the effects other systems have on the atmosphere, and the effects of the atmosphere on these other systems.
    - History of atmospheric chemistry
- History of biogeography – history of the study of the distribution of species (biology), organisms, and ecosystems in geographic space and through geological time.
- History of cartography – history of the study and practice of making maps or globes.
- History of climatology – history of the study of climate, scientifically defined as weather conditions averaged over a period of time
- History of coastal geography – history of the study of the dynamic interface between the ocean and the land, incorporating both the physical geography (i.e. coastal geomorphology, geology, and oceanography) and the human geography (sociology and history) of the coast.
- History of environmental science – history of an integrated, quantitative, and interdisciplinary approach to the study of environmental systems.
  - History of ecology – history of the scientific study of the distribution and abundance of living organisms and how they are affected by interactions between the organisms and their environment.
    - History of Freshwater biology – history of the scientific biological study of freshwater ecosystems and is a branch of limnology
    - History of marine biology – history of the scientific study of organisms in the ocean or other marine or brackish bodies of water
    - History of parasitology – The history of parasitology studies parasites, their hosts, and their relationships.
    - History of population dynamics – history of population dynamics is the branch of life sciences that studies short-term and long-term changes in the size and age composition of populations and the biological and environmental processes influencing those changes.
  - History of environmental chemistry – The history of environmental chemistry is the scientific study of the chemical and biochemical phenomena that occur in natural places.
  - History of environmental soil science – The history of environmental soil science is the study of the interaction of humans with the pedosphere as well as critical aspects of the biosphere, the lithosphere, the hydrosphere, and the atmosphere.
  - History of environmental geology – The history of environmental geology, like hydrogeology, is an applied science concerned with the practical application of the principles of geology in solving environmental problems.
- History of geodesy – history of the scientific discipline that deals with the measurement and representation of the Earth, including its gravitational field, in a three-dimensional time-varying space
- History of geography – history of the science that studies the lands, features, inhabitants, and phenomena of Earth
- History of geoinformatics – the history of the science and the technology used to develop and use information science infrastructure to address the problems of geography, geosciences, and related branches of engineering.
- History of geology – history of studying Earth, with the general exclusion of present-day life, flow within the ocean, and the atmosphere.
  - History of planetary geology – the history of the planetary science discipline concerned with the geology of the celestial bodies, such as the planets and their moons, asteroids, comets, and meteorites.
- History of geomorphology – history of the scientific study of landforms and the processes that shape them
- History of geostatistics – history of the branch of statistics focusing on spatial or spatiotemporal datasets
- History of geophysics – history of the physics of the Earth and its environment in space; also the study of the Earth using quantitative physical methods.
- History of glaciology – history of the study of glaciers, or more generally, ice, and natural phenomena that involve ice.
- History of hydrology – history of studying water movement, distribution, and quality on Earth and other planets, including the hydrologic cycle, water resources, and environmental watershed sustainability.
- History of hydrogeology – history of the area of geology that deals with the distribution and movement of groundwater in the soil and rocks of the Earth's crust (commonly in aquifers).
- History of mineralogy – history of the study of chemistry, crystal structure, and physical (including optical) properties of minerals.
- History of meteorology – history of the interdisciplinary scientific study of the atmosphere, which explains and forecasts weather events.
- History of oceanography – history of the branch of Earth science that studies the ocean
- History of paleoclimatology – history of the study of changes in climate taken on the scale of the entire history of Earth
- History of paleontology – history of the study of prehistoric life
- History of petrology – history of the geology branch that studies rocks' origin, composition, distribution, and structure.
- History of limnology – history of the study of inland waters
- History of seismology – history of the scientific study of earthquakes and the propagation of elastic waves through the Earth or other planet-like bodies
- History of soil science – history of the study of soil as a natural resource on the surface of the Earth, including soil formation, classification, and mapping; physical, chemical, biological, and fertility properties of soils; and these properties concerning the use and management of soils.
- History of topography – history of the study of surface shape and features of the Earth and other observable astronomical objects, including planets, moons, and asteroids.
- History of volcanology – history of studying volcanoes, lava, magma, and related geological, geophysical and geochemical phenomena.

== Earth science programs ==
- NASA Earth Science

== Earth science organizations ==
- List of geoscience organizations

== Earth science journals ==
- Annual Review of Earth and Planetary Sciences
- Earth-Science Reviews
- Nature Geoscience
- Radiocarbon
- Reviews of Geophysics

== People influential in Earth science ==
- James Hutton
- Alfred Wegener
- Isabelle Daniel
- Robert Hazen
- Naomi Oreskes
- Michael E. Mann

== See also ==
- Outline of science –
  - Outline of natural science –
    - Outline of physical science –
      - Outline of Earth science
  - Outline of formal science –
  - Outline of social science –
  - Outline of applied science –
