= Outline of physical science =

Hierarchical outline list of articles related to the physical sciences

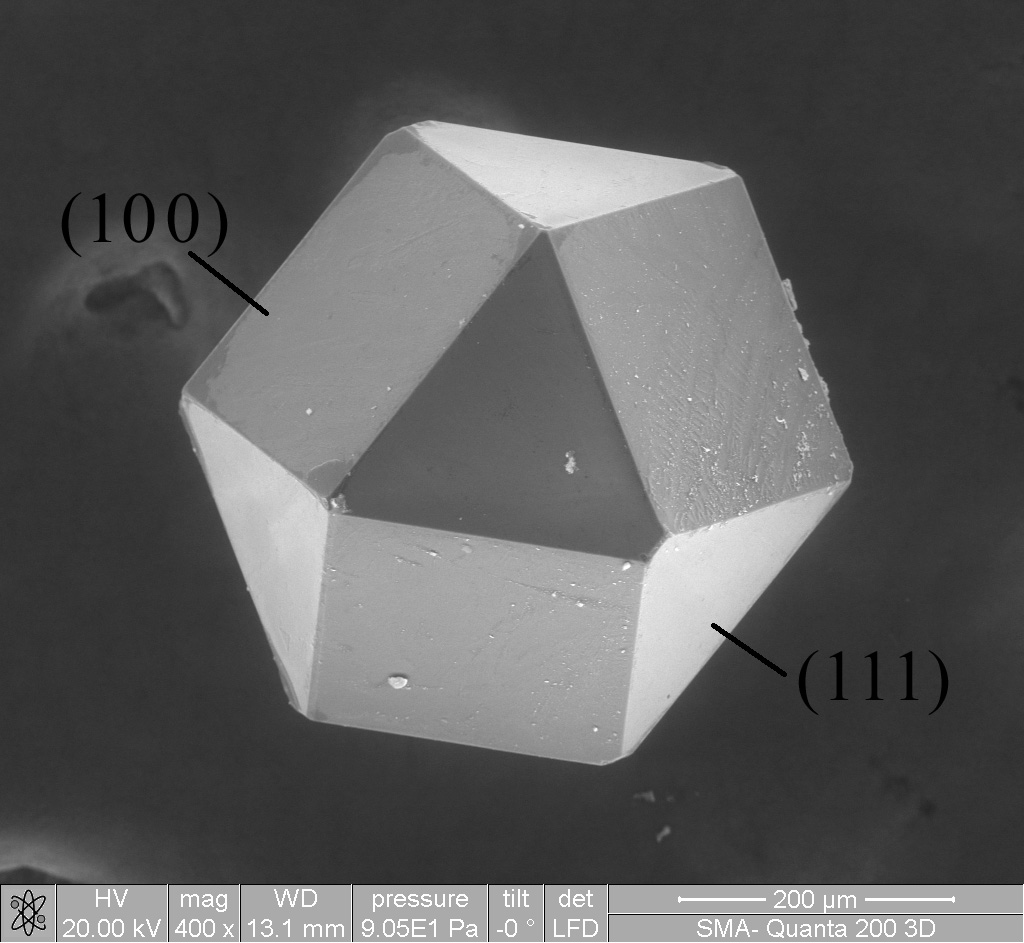
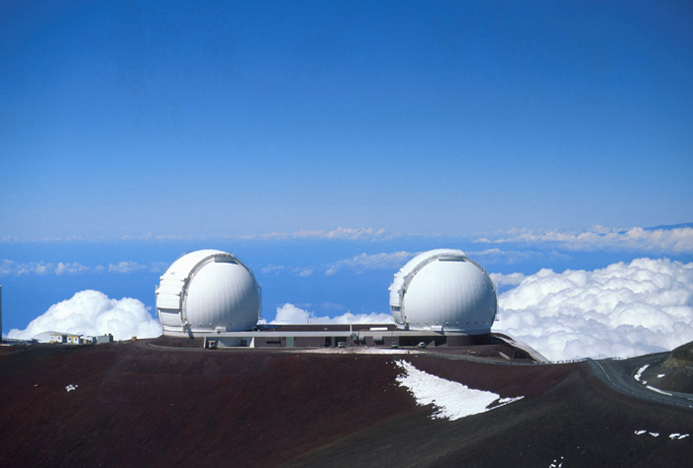
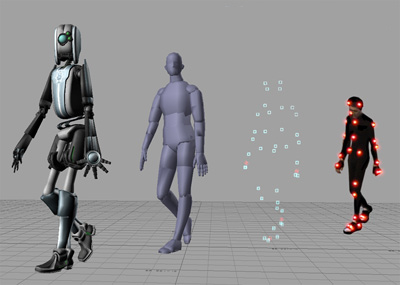
Different types of subjects studied in physical sciences
- top: diagram of the structure of the Earth including its atmosphere in Earth sciences and a diamond cuboctahedron in materials science
- bottom: Maunakea Observatories, group of independent astronomical research facilities in Hawaii and an example of computer animation which is produced from the "motion capture" technique

Physical science is a branch of natural science that studies non-living systems, in contrast to life science. It in turn has many branches, collectively referred to as the physical sciences.

== Definition ==
Physical science can be described as all of the following:

- A branch of science (a systematic enterprise that builds and organizes knowledge in the form of testable explanations and predictions about the universe).
- A branch of natural science – natural science is a major branch of science that tries to explain and predict nature's phenomena, based on empirical evidence. In natural science, hypotheses must be verified scientifically to be regarded as scientific theory. Validity, accuracy, and social mechanisms ensuring quality control, such as peer review and repeatability of findings, are amongst the criteria and methods used for this purpose. Natural science can be broken into two main branches: life science (for example biology) and physical science. Each of these branches, and all of their sub-branches, are referred to as natural sciences.
- A branch of applied science – the application of the scientific method and scientific knowledge to attain practical goals. It includes a broad range of disciplines, such as engineering and medicine, although medicine would not normally be considered a physical science. Applied science is often contrasted with basic science, which is focused on advancing scientific theories and laws that explain and predict natural or other phenomena.

== Branches ==
=== Main branches ===
- Physics – natural and physical science could involve the study of matter and its motion through space and time, along with related concepts such as energy and force. More broadly, it is the general analysis of nature, conducted in order to understand how the universe behaves. (Note: The term 'universe' is defined as everything that physically exists: the entirety of space and time, all forms of matter, energy and momentum, and the physical laws and constants that govern them. However, the term 'universe' may also be used in slightly different contextual senses, denoting concepts such as the cosmos or the philosophical world.)
  - Branches of physics
- Astronomy – study of celestial objects (such as stars, galaxies, planets, moons, asteroids, comets and nebulae), the physics, chemistry, and evolution of such objects, and phenomena that originate outside the atmosphere of Earth, including supernovae explosions, gamma-ray bursts, and cosmic microwave background radiation.
  - Branches of astronomy
- Chemistry – studies the composition, structure, properties and change of matter. In this realm, chemistry deals with such topics as the properties of individual atoms, the manner in which atoms form chemical bonds in the formation of compounds, the interactions of substances through intermolecular forces to give matter its general properties, and the interactions between substances through chemical reactions to form different substances.
  - Branches of chemistry
- Earth science – all-embracing term referring to the fields of science dealing with planet Earth. Earth science is the study of how the natural environment (ecosphere or Earth system) works and how it evolved to its current state. It includes the study of the atmosphere, hydrosphere, lithosphere, and biosphere.
  - Branches of earth science

=== Sometimes included ===
- Materials science – an interdisciplinary field of researching and discovering materials. Materials scientists emphasize understanding how the history of a material (processing) influences its structure, and also the material's properties and performance. The understanding of processing structure properties relationships is called the materials paradigm. This paradigm is used for advanced understanding in a variety of research areas, including nanotechnology, biomaterials, and metallurgy.
- Computer science – the study of computation, information, and automation. Computer science spans theoretical disciplines (such as algorithms, theory of computation, and information theory) to applied disciplines (including the design and implementation of hardware and software).

== History ==
History of physical science – history of the branch of natural science that studies non-living systems, in contrast to the life sciences. It in turn has many branches, each referred to as a "physical science", together called the "physical sciences". However, the term "physical" creates an unintended, somewhat arbitrary distinction, since many branches of physical science also study biological phenomena (organic chemistry, for example). The four main branches of physical science are astronomy, physics, chemistry, and the Earth sciences, which include meteorology and geology. There are also a number of others which have become important in the 21st century such as materials science and computer science.

- History of physics – history of the physical science that studies matter and its motion through space-time, and related concepts such as energy and force
  - History of acoustics – history of the study of mechanical waves in solids, liquids, and gases (such as vibration and sound)
  - History of agrophysics – history of the study of physics applied to agroecosystems
    - History of soil physics – history of the study of soil physical properties and processes.
  - History of astrophysics – history of the study of the physical aspects of celestial objects
  - History of astronomy – history of the study of the universe beyond Earth, including its formation and development, and the evolution, physics, chemistry, meteorology, and motion of celestial objects (such as galaxies, planets, etc.) and phenomena that originate outside the atmosphere of Earth (such as the cosmic background radiation).
    - History of astrodynamics – history of the application of ballistics and celestial mechanics to the practical problems concerning the motion of rockets and other spacecraft.
    - History of astrometry – history of the branch of astronomy that involves precise measurements of the positions and movements of stars and other celestial bodies.
    - History of cosmology – history of the discipline that deals with the nature of the Universe as a whole.
    - History of extragalactic astronomy – history of the branch of astronomy concerned with objects outside our own Milky Way Galaxy
    - History of galactic astronomy – history of the study of our own Milky Way galaxy and all its contents.
    - History of physical cosmology – history of the study of the largest-scale structures and dynamics of the universe and is concerned with fundamental questions about its formation and evolution.
    - History of planetary science – history of the scientific study of planets (including Earth), moons, and planetary systems, in particular those of the Solar System and the processes that form them.
    - History of stellar astronomy – history of the natural science that deals with the study of celestial objects (such as stars, planets, comets, nebulae, star clusters, and galaxies) and phenomena that originate outside the atmosphere of Earth (such as cosmic background radiation)
  - History of atmospheric physics – history of the study of the application of physics to the atmosphere
  - History of atomic, molecular, and optical physics – history of the study of how matter and light interact
  - History of biophysics – history of the study of physical processes relating to biology
    - History of medical physics – history of the application of physics concepts, theories and methods to medicine.
    - History of neurophysics – history of the branch of biophysics dealing with the nervous system.
  - History of chemical physics – history of the branch of physics that studies chemical processes from the point of view of physics.
  - History of computational physics – history of the study and implementation of numerical algorithms to solve problems in physics for which a quantitative theory already exists.
  - History of condensed matter physics – history of the study of the physical properties of condensed phases of matter.
  - History of cryogenics – history of cryogenics is the study of the production of very low temperature (below −150 °C, −238 °F or 123K) and the behavior of materials at those temperatures.
  - History of Dynamics – history of the study of the causes of motion and changes in motion
  - History of econophysics – history of the interdisciplinary research field, applying theories and methods originally developed by physicists in order to solve problems in economics
  - History of electromagnetism – history of the branch of science concerned with the forces that occur between electrically charged particles.
  - History of geophysics – history of the physics of the Earth and its environment in space; also the study of the Earth using quantitative physical methods
  - History of materials physics – history of the use of physics to describe materials in many different ways such as force, heat, light and mechanics.
  - History of mathematical physics – history of the application of mathematics to problems in physics and the development of mathematical methods for such applications and for the formulation of physical theories.
  - History of mechanics – history of the branch of physics concerned with the behavior of physical bodies when subjected to forces or displacements, and the subsequent effects of the bodies on their environment.
    - History of biomechanics – history of the study of the structure and function of biological systems such as humans, animals, plants, organs, and cells by means of the methods of mechanics.
    - History of classical mechanics – history of one of the two major sub-fields of mechanics, which is concerned with the set of physical laws describing the motion of bodies under the action of a system of forces.
    - History of continuum mechanics – history of the branch of mechanics that deals with the analysis of the kinematics and the mechanical behavior of materials modeled as a continuous mass rather than as discrete particles.
    - History of fluid mechanics – history of the study of fluids and the forces on them.
    - History of quantum mechanics – history of the branch of physics dealing with physical phenomena where the action is on the order of the Planck constant.
    - History of thermodynamics – history of the branch of physical science concerned with heat and its relation to other forms of energy and work.
  - History of nuclear physics – history of the field of physics that studies the building blocks and interactions of atomic nuclei.
  - History of optics – history of the branch of physics which involves the behavior and properties of light, including its interactions with matter and the construction of instruments that use or detect it.
  - History of particle physics – history of the branch of physics that studies the existence and interactions of particles that are the constituents of what is usually referred to as matter or radiation.
  - History of psychophysics – history of the quantitatively investigates the relationship between physical stimuli and the sensations and perceptions they affect.
  - History of plasma physics – history of the state of matter similar to gas in which a certain portion of the particles are ionized.
  - History of polymer physics – history of the field of physics that studies polymers, their fluctuations, mechanical properties, as well as the kinetics of reactions involving degradation and polymerization of polymers and monomers respectively.
  - History of quantum physics – history of the branch of physics dealing with physical phenomena where the action is on the order of the Planck constant.
  - History of theory of relativity –
  - History of statics – history of the branch of mechanics concerned with the analysis of loads (force, torque/moment) on physical systems in static equilibrium, that is, in a state where the relative positions of subsystems do not vary over time, or where components and structures are at a constant velocity.
  - History of solid state physics – history of the study of rigid matter, or solids, through methods such as quantum mechanics, crystallography, electromagnetism, and metallurgy.
  - History of vehicle dynamics – history of the dynamics of vehicles, here assumed to be ground vehicles.
- History of chemistry – history of the physical science of atomic matter (matter that is composed of chemical elements), especially its chemical reactions, but also including its properties, structure, composition, behavior, and changes as they relate the chemical reactions
  - History of analytical chemistry – history of the study of the separation, identification, and quantification of the chemical components of natural and artificial materials.
  - History of astrochemistry – history of the study of the abundance and reactions of chemical elements and molecules in the universe, and their interaction with radiation.
    - History of cosmochemistry – history of the study of the chemical composition of matter in the universe and the processes that led to those compositions
  - History of atmospheric chemistry – history of the branch of atmospheric science in which the chemistry of the Earth's atmosphere and that of other planets is studied. It is a multidisciplinary field of research and draws on environmental chemistry, physics, meteorology, computer modeling, oceanography, geology and volcanology, and other disciplines
  - History of biochemistry – history of the study of chemical processes in living organisms, including, but not limited to, living matter. Biochemistry governs all living organisms and living processes.
    - History of agrochemistry – history of the study of both chemistry and biochemistry which are important in agricultural production, the processing of raw products into foods and beverages, and in environmental monitoring and remediation.
    - History of bioinorganic chemistry – history of the examines the role of metals in biology.
    - History of bioorganic chemistry – history of the rapidly growing scientific discipline that combines organic chemistry and biochemistry.
    - History of biophysical chemistry – history of the new branch of chemistry that covers a broad spectrum of research activities involving biological systems.
    - History of environmental chemistry – history of the scientific study of the chemical and biochemical phenomena that occur in natural places.
    - History of immunochemistry – history of the branch of chemistry that involves the study of the reactions and components on the immune system.
    - History of medicinal chemistry – history of the discipline at the intersection of chemistry, especially synthetic organic chemistry, and pharmacology and various other biological specialties, where they are involved with design, chemical synthesis, and development for market of pharmaceutical agents (drugs).
    - History of pharmacology – history of the branch of medicine and biology concerned with the study of drug action.
    - History of natural product chemistry – history of the chemical compound or substance produced by a living organism – history of the found in nature that usually has a pharmacological or biological activity for use in pharmaceutical drug discovery and drug design.
    - History of neurochemistry – history of the specific study of neurochemicals, which include neurotransmitters and other molecules such as neuro-active drugs that influence neuron function.
  - History of computational chemistry – history of the branch of chemistry that uses principles of computer science to assist in solving chemical problems.
    - History of chemo-informatics – history of the use of computer and informational techniques, applied to a range of problems in the field of chemistry.
    - History of molecular mechanics – history of the uses Newtonian mechanics to model molecular systems.
  - History of Flavor chemistry – history of someone who uses chemistry to engineer artificial and natural flavors.
  - History of Flow chemistry – history of the chemical reaction is run in a continuously flowing stream rather than in batch production.
  - History of geochemistry – history of the study of the mechanisms behind major geological systems using chemistry
    - History of aqueous geochemistry – history of the study of the role of various elements in watersheds, including copper, sulfur, mercury, and how elemental fluxes are exchanged through atmospheric-terrestrial-aquatic interactions
    - History of isotope geochemistry – history of the study of the relative and absolute concentrations of the elements and their isotopes using chemistry and geology
    - History of ocean chemistry – history of the study of the chemistry of marine environments including the influences of different variables.
    - History of organic geochemistry – history of the study of the impacts and processes that organisms have had on Earth
    - History of regional, environmental and exploration geochemistry – history of the study of the spatial variation in the chemical composition of materials at the surface of the Earth
  - History of inorganic chemistry – history of the branch of chemistry concerned with the properties and behavior of inorganic compounds.
  - History of nuclear chemistry – history of the subfield of chemistry dealing with radioactivity, nuclear processes, and nuclear properties.
    - History of radiochemistry – history of the chemistry of radioactive materials, where radioactive isotopes of elements are used to study the properties and chemical reactions of non-radioactive isotopes (often within radiochemistry the absence of radioactivity leads to a substance being described as being inactive as the isotopes are stable).
  - History of organic chemistry – history of the study of the structure, properties, composition, reactions, and preparation (by synthesis or by other means) of carbon-based compounds, hydrocarbons, and their derivatives.
    - History of petrochemistry – history of the branch of chemistry that studies the transformation of crude oil (petroleum) and natural gas into useful products or raw materials.
  - History of organometallic chemistry – history of the study of chemical compounds containing bonds between carbon and a metal.
  - History of photochemistry – history of the study of chemical reactions that proceed with the absorption of light by atoms or molecules.
  - History of physical chemistry – history of the study of macroscopic, atomic, subatomic, and particulate phenomena in chemical systems in terms of physical laws and concepts.
    - History of chemical kinetics – history of the study of rates of chemical processes.
    - History of chemical thermodynamics – history of the study of the interrelation of heat and work with chemical reactions or with physical changes of state within the confines of the laws of thermodynamics.
    - History of electrochemistry – history of the branch of chemistry that studies chemical reactions which take place in a solution at the interface of an electron conductor (a metal or a semiconductor) and an ionic conductor (the electrolyte), and which involve electron transfer between the electrode and the electrolyte or species in solution.
    - History of Femtochemistry – history of the Femtochemistry is the science that studies chemical reactions on extremely short timescales, approximately 10^{−15} seconds (one femtosecond, hence the name).
    - History of mathematical chemistry – history of the area of research engaged in novel applications of mathematics to chemistry; it concerns itself principally with the mathematical modeling of chemical phenomena.
    - History of mechanochemistry – history of the coupling of the mechanical and the chemical phenomena on a molecular scale and includes mechanical breakage, chemical behavior of mechanically stressed solids (e.g., stress-corrosion cracking), tribology, polymer degradation under shear, cavitation-related phenomena (e.g., sonochemistry and sonoluminescence), shock wave chemistry and physics, and even the burgeoning field of molecular machines.
    - History of physical organic chemistry – history of the study of the interrelationships between structure and reactivity in organic molecules.
    - History of quantum chemistry – history of the branch of chemistry whose primary focus is the application of quantum mechanics in physical models and experiments of chemical systems.
    - History of sonochemistry – history of the study of the effect of sonic waves and wave properties on chemical systems.
    - History of stereochemistry – history of the study of the relative spatial arrangement of atoms within molecules.
    - History of supramolecular chemistry – history of the area of chemistry beyond the molecules and focuses on the chemical systems made up of a discrete number of assembled molecular subunits or components.
    - History of thermochemistry – history of the study of the energy and heat associated with chemical reactions and/or physical transformations.
  - History of phytochemistry – history of the strict sense of the word the study of phytochemicals.
  - History of polymer chemistry – history of the multidisciplinary science that deals with the chemical synthesis and chemical properties of polymers or macromolecules.
  - History of solid-state chemistry – history of the study of the synthesis, structure, and properties of solid phase materials, particularly, but not necessarily exclusively of, non-molecular solids
  - Multidisciplinary fields involving chemistry
    - History of chemical biology – history of the scientific discipline spanning the fields of chemistry and biology that involves the application of chemical techniques and tools, often compounds produced through synthetic chemistry, to the study and manipulation of biological systems.
    - History of chemical engineering – history of the branch of engineering that deals with physical science (e.g., chemistry and physics), and life sciences (e.g., biology, microbiology and biochemistry) with mathematics and economics, to the process of converting raw materials or chemicals into more useful or valuable forms.
    - History of chemical oceanography – history of the study of the behavior of the chemical elements within the Earth's oceans.
    - History of chemical physics – history of the branch of physics that studies chemical processes from the point of view of physics.
    - History of materials science – history of the interdisciplinary field applying the properties of matter to various areas of science and engineering.
    - History of nanotechnology – history of the study of manipulating matter on an atomic and molecular scale
    - History of oenology – history of the science and study of all aspects of wine and winemaking except vine-growing and grape-harvesting, which is a subfield called viticulture.
    - History of spectroscopy – history of the study of the interaction between matter and radiated energy
    - History of surface science – history of the Surface science is the study of physical and chemical phenomena that occur at the interface of two phases, including solid–liquid interfaces, solid–gas interfaces, solid–vacuum interfaces, and liquid–gas interfaces.
- History of Earth science – history of the all-embracing term for the sciences related to the planet Earth. Earth science, and all of its branches, are branches of physical science.
  - History of atmospheric sciences – history of the umbrella term for the study of the atmosphere, its processes, the effects other systems have on the atmosphere, and the effects of the atmosphere on these other systems.
    - History of climatology
    - History of meteorology
      - History of atmospheric chemistry
  - History of biogeography – history of the study of the distribution of species (biology), organisms, and ecosystems in geographic space and through geological time.
  - History of cartography – history of the study and practice of making maps or globes.
  - History of climatology – history of the study of climate, scientifically defined as weather conditions averaged over a period of time
  - History of coastal geography – history of the study of the dynamic interface between the ocean and the land, incorporating both the physical geography (i.e. coastal geomorphology, geology and oceanography) and the human geography (sociology and history) of the coast.
  - History of environmental science – history of an integrated, quantitative, and interdisciplinary approach to the study of environmental systems.
    - History of ecology – history of the scientific study of the distribution and abundance of living organisms and how the distribution and abundance are affected by interactions between the organisms and their environment.
      - History of Freshwater biology – history of the scientific biological study of freshwater ecosystems and is a branch of limnology
      - History of marine biology – history of the scientific study of organisms in the ocean or other marine or brackish bodies of water
      - History of parasitology – history of the Parasitology is the study of parasites, their hosts, and the relationship between them.
      - History of population dynamics – history of the Population dynamics is the branch of life sciences that studies short-term and long-term changes in the size and age composition of populations, and the biological and environmental processes influencing those changes.
    - History of environmental chemistry – history of the Environmental chemistry is the scientific study of the chemical and biochemical phenomena that occur in natural places.
    - History of environmental soil science – history of the Environmental soil science is the study of the interaction of humans with the pedosphere as well as critical aspects of the biosphere, the lithosphere, the hydrosphere, and the atmosphere.
    - History of environmental geology – history of the Environmental geology, like hydrogeology, is an applied science concerned with the practical application of the principles of geology in the solving of environmental problems.
    - History of toxicology – history of the branch of biology, chemistry, and medicine concerned with the study of the adverse effects of chemicals on living organisms.
  - History of geodesy – history of the scientific discipline that deals with the measurement and representation of the Earth, including its gravitational field, in a three-dimensional time-varying space
  - History of geography – history of the science that studies the lands, features, inhabitants, and phenomena of Earth
  - History of geoinformatics – history of the science and the technology which develops and uses information science infrastructure to address the problems of geography, geosciences and related branches of engineering.
  - History of geology – history of the study of the Earth, with the general exclusion of present-day life, flow within the ocean, and the atmosphere.
    - History of planetary geology – history of the planetary science discipline concerned with the geology of the celestial bodies such as the planets and their moons, asteroids, comets, and meteorites.
  - History of geomorphology – history of the scientific study of landforms and the processes that shape them
  - History of geostatistics – history of the branch of statistics focusing on spatial or spatiotemporal datasets
  - History of geophysics – history of the physics of the Earth and its environment in space; also the study of the Earth using quantitative physical methods.
  - History of glaciology – history of the study of glaciers, or more generally ice and natural phenomena that involve ice.
  - History of hydrology – history of the study of the movement, distribution, and quality of water on Earth and other planets, including the hydrologic cycle, water resources and environmental watershed sustainability.
  - History of hydrogeology – history of the area of geology that deals with the distribution and movement of groundwater in the soil and rocks of the Earth's crust (commonly in aquifers).
  - History of mineralogy – history of the study of chemistry, crystal structure, and physical (including optical) properties of minerals.
  - History of meteorology – history of the interdisciplinary scientific study of the atmosphere which explains and forecasts weather events.
  - History of oceanography – history of the branch of Earth science that studies the ocean
  - History of paleoclimatology – history of the study of changes in climate taken on the scale of the entire history of Earth
  - History of paleontology – history of the study of prehistoric life
  - History of petrology – history of the branch of geology that studies the origin, composition, distribution and structure of rocks.
  - History of limnology – history of the study of inland waters
  - History of seismology – history of the scientific study of earthquakes and the propagation of elastic waves through the Earth or through other planet-like bodies
  - History of soil science – history of the study of soil as a natural resource on the surface of the earth including soil formation, classification and mapping; physical, chemical, biological, and fertility properties of soils; and these properties in relation to the use and management of soils.
  - History of topography – history of the study of surface shape and features of the Earth and other observable astronomical objects including planets, moons, and asteroids.
  - History of volcanology – history of the study of volcanoes, lava, magma, and related geological, geophysical and geochemical phenomena.

== General principles ==
- Principle – law or rule that has to be, or usually is to be followed, or can be desirably followed, or is an inevitable consequence of something, such as the laws observed in nature or the way that a system is constructed. The principles of such a system are understood by its users as the essential characteristics of the system, or reflecting system's designed purpose, and the effective operation or use of which would be impossible if any one of the principles was to be ignored.

=== Basic principles of physics ===
Physics – branch of science that studies matter and its motion through space and time, along with related concepts such as energy and force. Physics is one of the "fundamental sciences" because the other natural sciences (like biology, geology, etc.) deal with systems that seem to obey the laws of physics. According to physics, the physical laws of matter, energy, and the fundamental forces of nature govern the interactions between particles and physical entities (such as planets, molecules, atoms, or subatomic particles). Some of the basic pursuits of physics, which include some of the most prominent developments in modern science in the last millennium, include:

- Describing the nature, measuring and quantifying of bodies and their motion, dynamics etc.
  - Newton's laws of motion
  - Mass, force and weight
  - Momentum, angular momentum and their conservation
  - Gravity, theories of gravity
  - Energy, work and their relationship
  - Different forms of Energy, their interconversion and the inevitable loss of energy in the form of heat (Thermodynamics)
  - Energy conservation, conversion, and transfer.
  - Energy source the transfer of energy from one source to work in another.
- Kinetic molecular theory
  - Phases of matter and phase transitions
  - Temperature and thermometers
  - Energy and heat
  - Heat flow: conduction, convection, and radiation
  - The four laws of thermodynamics
- The principles of waves and sound
- The principles of electricity, magnetism, and electromagnetism
- The principles, sources, and properties of light

=== Basic principles of astronomy ===
Astronomy – science of celestial bodies and their interactions in space. Its studies include the following:

- The life and characteristics of stars and galaxies
- Origins of the universe. Physical science uses the Big Bang theory as the commonly accepted scientific theory of the origin of the universe.
- A heliocentric Solar System. Ancient cultures saw the Earth as the centre of the Solar System or universe (geocentrism). In the 16th century, Nicolaus Copernicus advanced the ideas of heliocentrism, recognizing the Sun as the centre of the Solar System.
- The structure of solar systems, planets, comets, asteroids, and meteors
- The shape and structure of Earth (roughly spherical, see also Spherical Earth)
- Earth in the Solar System
- Time measurement
- The composition and features of the Moon
- Interactions of the Earth and Moon

(Note: Astronomy should not be confused with astrology, which assumes that people's destiny and human affairs in general correlate to the apparent positions of astronomical objects in the sky – although the two fields share a common origin, they are quite different; astronomers embrace the scientific method, while astrologers do not.)

=== Basic principles of chemistry ===
Chemistry – branch of science that studies the composition, structure, properties and change of matter. Chemistry is chiefly concerned with atoms and molecules and their interactions and transformations, for example, the properties of the chemical bonds formed between atoms to create chemical compounds. As such, chemistry studies the involvement of electrons and various forms of energy in photochemical reactions, oxidation-reduction reactions, changes in phases of matter, and separation of mixtures. Preparation and properties of complex substances, such as alloys, polymers, biological molecules, and pharmaceutical agents are considered in specialized fields of chemistry.

Chemistry, the central science, partial ordering of the sciences proposed by Balaban and Klein.

- Physical chemistry
  - Chemical thermodynamics
  - Reaction kinetics
  - Molecular structure
  - Quantum chemistry
  - Spectroscopy
- Theoretical chemistry
  - Electron configuration
  - Molecular modelling
  - Molecular dynamics
  - Statistical mechanics
- Computational chemistry
  - Mathematical chemistry
  - Cheminformatics
- Nuclear chemistry
  - The nature of the atomic nucleus
  - Characterization of radioactive decay
  - Nuclear reactions
- Organic chemistry
  - Organic compounds
  - Organic reaction
  - Functional groups
  - Organic synthesis
- Inorganic chemistry
  - Inorganic compounds
  - Crystal structure
  - Coordination chemistry
  - Solid-state chemistry
- Biochemistry
- Analytical chemistry
  - Instrumental analysis
  - Electroanalytical method
  - Wet chemistry
- Electrochemistry
  - Redox reaction
- Materials chemistry

=== Basic principles of Earth science ===
Earth science – the science of the planet Earth, as of 2018 the only identified life-bearing planet. Its studies include the following:

- The water cycle and the process of transpiration
- Freshwater
- Oceanography
  - Weathering and erosion
  - Rocks
- Agrophysics
- Soil science
  - Pedogenesis
  - Soil fertility
- Earth's tectonic structure
- Geomorphology and geophysics
  - Physical geography
  - Seismology: stress, strain, and earthquakes
  - Characteristics of mountains and volcanoes
- Characteristics and formation of fossils
- Atmospheric sciences – the branches of science that study the atmosphere, its processes, the effects other systems have on the atmosphere, and the effects of the atmosphere on these other systems.
  - Atmosphere of Earth
  - Atmospheric pressure and winds
  - Evaporation, condensation, and humidity
  - Fog and clouds
- Meteorology, weather, climatology, and climate
  - Hydrology, clouds and precipitation
  - Air masses and weather fronts
  - Major storms: thunderstorms, tornadoes, and hurricanes
  - Major climate groups
- Speleology
  - Cave

== Notable physical scientists ==
- List of physicists
- List of astronomers
- List of chemists
- List of earth scientists

== See also ==
- Outline of science
  - Outline of natural science
    - Outline of physical science
      - Outline of earth science
  - Outline of formal science
  - Outline of social science
  - Outline of applied science
