= Outline of natural science =

Overview of and topical guide to natural science

The following outline is provided as an overview of and topical guide to natural science:

Natural science – a major branch of science that tries to explain, and predict, nature's phenomena based on empirical evidence. In natural science, hypothesis must be verified scientifically to be regarded as scientific theory. Validity, accuracy, and social mechanisms ensuring quality control, such as peer review and repeatability of findings, are amongst the criteria and methods used for this purpose. Natural science can be broken into 2 main branches: life science, and physical science. Each of these branches, and all of their sub-branches, are referred to as natural sciences.

== Overview ==
Natural science can be described as all of the following:

- Branch of science – systematic enterprise that builds and organizes knowledge in the form of testable explanations and predictions about the universe.
- Major category of academic disciplines – an academic discipline is focused study in one academic field or profession. A discipline incorporates expertise, people, projects, communities, challenges, studies, inquiry, and research areas that are strongly associated with academic areas of study or areas of professional practice. For example, the branches of science are commonly referred to as the scientific disciplines. For instance, Gravitation is strongly associated with the discipline of physics, and is considered to be part of that disciplinary knowledge.

== Branches of natural science ==
=== Physical science ===
- Physical science – branch of natural science that studies non-living systems, in contrast to the biological sciences. It in turn has many branches, each referred to as a "physical science", together called the "physical sciences". However, the term "physical" creates an unintended, somewhat arbitrary distinction, since many branches of physical science also study biological phenomena (organic chemistry, for example).

==== Astronomy ====
- Astronomy – studies the universe beyond Earth, including its formation and development, and the evolution, physics, chemistry, meteorology, and motion of celestial objects (such as galaxies, planets, etc.) and phenomena that originate outside the atmosphere of Earth (such as the cosmic background radiation).
  - Astrobiology – study of evolution, distribution, and future of life in the universe—also known as exobiology, exopaleontology, and bioastronomy.
  - Astrodynamics – application of ballistics and celestial mechanics to the practical problems concerning the motion of rockets and other spacecraft.
  - Astrophysics – study of the physical aspects of celestial objects.
  - Astrometry – branch of astronomy that involves precise measurements of the positions and movements of stars and other celestially bodies.
  - Cosmology – discipline that deals with the nature of the Universe as a whole.
  - Extragalactic astronomy – branch of astronomy concerned with objects outside our own Milky Way Galaxy.
  - Galactic astronomy – study of our own Milky Way galaxy and all its contents.
  - Heliophysics – study of the Sun and its interactions with the Solar System.
  - Physical cosmology – study of the largest-scale structures and dynamics of the universe and is concerned with fundamental questions about its formation and evolution.
  - Planetary science – scientific study of planets (including Earth), moons, and planetary systems, in particular those of the Solar System and the processes that form them.
  - Stellar astronomy – natural science that deals with the study of celestial objects (such as stars, planets, comets, nebulae, star clusters, and galaxies) and phenomena that originate outside the atmosphere of Earth (such as cosmic background radiation).
  - Time-domain astronomy – study of astronomical objects that change within an observable timescale (i.e seconds to years).

==== Physics ====
- Physics – physical science that studies matter and its motion through space-time, and related concepts such as energy and force.
  - Acoustics – study of mechanical waves in solids, liquids, and gases (such as vibration and sound)
  - Agrophysics – study of physics applied to agroecosystems
    - Soil physics – study of soil physical properties and processes.
  - Atmospheric physics – study of the application of physics to the atmosphere
  - Atomic, molecular, and optical physics – study of how matter and light interact
  - Biophysics – study of physical processes relating to biology
    - Medical physics – application of physics concepts, theories and methods to medicine.
    - Neurophysics – branch of biophysics dealing with the nervous system.
  - Chemical physics – branch of physics that studies chemical processes from the point of view of physics.
  - Computational physics – study and implementation of numerical algorithms to solve problems in physics for which a quantitative theory already exists.
  - Condensed matter physics – study of the physical properties of condensed phases of matter.
  - Cryogenics – cryogenics is the study of the production of very low temperature (below −150 °C, −238 °F or 123K) and the behavior of materials at those temperatures.
  - Dynamics – study of the causes of motion and changes in motion
  - Econophysics – interdisciplinary research field, applying theories and methods originally developed by physicists in order to solve problems in economics
  - Electromagnetism – branch of science concerned with the forces that occur between electrically charged particles.
  - Geophysics – the physics of the Earth and its environment in space; also the study of the Earth using quantitative physical methods
  - Materials physics – use of physics to describe materials in many different ways such as force, heat, light and mechanics.
  - Mathematical physics – application of mathematics to problems in physics and the development of mathematical methods for such applications and for the formulation of physical theories.
  - Mechanics – branch of physics concerned with the behavior of physical bodies when subjected to forces or displacements, and the subsequent effects of the bodies on their environment.
    - Biomechanics – study of the structure and function of biological systems such as humans, animals, plants, organs, and cells by means of the methods of mechanics.
    - Classical mechanics – one of the two major sub-fields of mechanics, which is concerned with the set of physical laws describing the motion of bodies under the action of a system of forces.
    - Continuum mechanics – branch of mechanics that deals with the analysis of the kinematics and the mechanical behavior of materials modeled as a continuous mass rather than as discrete particles.
    - Fluid mechanics – study of fluids and the forces on them.
    - Quantum mechanics – branch of physics dealing with physical phenomena where the action is on the order of the Planck constant.
    - Thermodynamics – branch of physical science concerned with heat and its relation to other forms of energy and work.
  - Nuclear physics – field of physics that studies the building blocks and interactions of atomic nuclei.
  - Optics – branch of physics which involves the behavior and properties of light, including its interactions with matter and the construction of instruments that use or detect it.
  - Particle physics – branch of physics that studies the existence and interactions of particles that are the constituents of what is usually referred to as matter or radiation.
  - Psychophysics – quantitatively investigates the relationship between physical stimuli and the sensations and perceptions they affect.
  - Plasma physics – state of matter similar to gas in which a certain portion of the particles are ionized.
  - Polymer physics – field of physics that studies polymers, their fluctuations, mechanical properties, as well as the kinetics of reactions involving degradation and polymerisation of polymers and monomers respectively.
  - Quantum physics – branch of physics dealing with physical phenomena where the action is on the order of the Planck constant.
  - Relativity – branch of physics dealing with the mechanics of objects that approach the speed of light.
  - Statics – branch of mechanics concerned with the analysis of loads (force, torque/moment) on physical systems in static equilibrium, that is, in a state where the relative positions of subsystems do not vary over time, or where components and structures are at a constant velocity.
  - Solid state physics – study of rigid matter, or solids, through methods such as quantum mechanics, crystallography, electromagnetism, and metallurgy.
  - Vehicle dynamics – dynamics of vehicles, here assumed to be ground vehicles.

==== Chemistry ====
- Chemistry – physical science of atomic matter (matter that is composed of chemical elements), especially its chemical reactions, but also including its properties, structure, composition, behavior, and changes as they relate the chemical reactions
  - Analytical chemistry – study of the separation, identification, and quantification of the chemical components of natural and artificial materials.
  - Astrochemistry – study of the abundance and reactions of chemical elements and molecules in the universe, and their interaction with radiation.
    - Cosmochemistry – study of the chemical composition of matter in the universe and the processes that led to those compositions
  - Atmospheric chemistry – branch of atmospheric science in which the chemistry of the Earth's atmosphere and that of other planets is studied. It is a multidisciplinary field of research and draws on environmental chemistry, physics, meteorology, computer modeling, oceanography, geology and volcanology and other disciplines
  - Biochemistry – study of chemical processes in living organisms, including, but not limited to, living matter. Biochemistry governs all living organisms and living processes.
    - Agrochemistry – study of both chemistry and biochemistry which are important in agricultural production, the processing of raw products into foods and beverages, and in environmental monitoring and remediation.
    - Bioinorganic chemistry – examines the role of metals in biology.
    - Bioorganic chemistry – rapidly growing scientific discipline that combines organic chemistry and biochemistry.
    - Biophysical chemistry – new branch of chemistry that covers a broad spectrum of research activities involving biological systems.
    - Environmental chemistry – scientific study of the chemical and biochemical phenomena that occur in natural places.
    - Immunochemistry – branch of chemistry that involves the study of the reactions and components on the immune system.
    - Medicinal chemistry – discipline at the intersection of chemistry, especially synthetic organic chemistry, and pharmacology and various other biological specialties, where they are involved with design, chemical synthesis and development for market of pharmaceutical agents (drugs).
    - Pharmacology – branch of medicine and biology concerned with the study of drug action.
    - Toxicology – branch of biology, chemistry, and medicine concerned with the study of the adverse effects of chemicals on living organisms.
    - Natural product chemistry – chemical compound or substance produced by a living organism – found in nature that usually has a pharmacological or biological activity for use in pharmaceutical drug discovery and drug design.
    - Neurochemistry – specific study of neurochemicals, which include neurotransmitters and other molecules such as neuro-active drugs that influence neuron function.
  - Computational chemistry – branch of chemistry that uses principles of computer science to assist in solving chemical problems.
    - Chemo-informatics – use of computer and informational techniques, applied to a range of problems in the field of chemistry.
    - Molecular mechanics – uses Newtonian mechanics to model molecular systems.
  - Flavor chemistry – someone who uses chemistry to engineer artificial and natural flavors.
  - Flow chemistry – chemical reaction is run in a continuously flowing stream rather than in batch production.
  - Geochemistry – study of the mechanisms behind major geological systems using chemistry
    - Aqueous geochemistry – study of the role of various elements in watersheds, including copper, sulfur, mercury, and how elemental fluxes are exchanged through atmospheric-terrestrial-aquatic interactions
    - Isotope geochemistry – study of the relative and absolute concentrations of the elements and their isotopes using chemistry and geology
    - Ocean chemistry – studies the chemistry of marine environments including the influences of different variables.
    - Organic geochemistry – study of the impacts and processes that organisms have had on Earth
    - Regional, environmental and exploration geochemistry – study of the spatial variation in the chemical composition of materials at the surface of the Earth
  - Inorganic chemistry – branch of chemistry concerned with the properties and behavior of inorganic compounds.
  - Nuclear chemistry – subfield of chemistry dealing with radioactivity, nuclear processes and nuclear properties.
    - Radiochemistry – chemistry of radioactive materials, where radioactive isotopes of elements are used to study the properties and chemical reactions of non-radioactive isotopes (often within radiochemistry the absence of radioactivity leads to a substance being described as being inactive as the isotopes are stable).
  - Organic chemistry – study of the structure, properties, composition, reactions, and preparation (by synthesis or by other means) of carbon-based compounds, hydrocarbons, and their derivatives.
    - Petrochemistry – branch of chemistry that studies the transformation of crude oil (petroleum) and natural gas into useful products or raw materials.
  - Organometallic chemistry – study of chemical compounds containing bonds between carbon and a metal.
  - Photochemistry – study of chemical reactions that proceed with the absorption of light by atoms or molecules..
  - Physical chemistry – study of macroscopic, atomic, subatomic, and particulate phenomena in chemical systems in terms of physical laws and concepts.
    - Chemical kinetics – the study of rates of chemical processes.
    - Chemical thermodynamics – study of the interrelation of heat and work with chemical reactions or with physical changes of state within the confines of the laws of thermodynamics.
    - Electrochemistry – branch of chemistry that studies chemical reactions which take place in a solution at the interface of an electron conductor (a metal or a semiconductor) and an ionic conductor (the electrolyte), and which involve electron transfer between the electrode and the electrolyte or species in solution.
    - Femtochemistry – Femtochemistry is the science that studies chemical reactions on extremely short timescales, approximately 10^{−15} seconds (one femtosecond, hence the name).
    - Mathematical chemistry – area of research engaged in novel applications of mathematics to chemistry; it concerns itself principally with the mathematical modeling of chemical phenomena.
    - Mechanochemistry – coupling of the mechanical and the chemical phenomena on a molecular scale and includes mechanical breakage, chemical behaviour of mechanically stressed solids (e.g., stress-corrosion cracking), tribology, polymer degradation under shear, cavitation-related phenomena (e.g., sonochemistry and sonoluminescence), shock wave chemistry and physics, and even the burgeoning field of molecular machines.
    - Physical organic chemistry – study of the interrelationships between structure and reactivity in organic molecules.
    - Quantum chemistry – branch of chemistry whose primary focus is the application of quantum mechanics in physical models and experiments of chemical systems.
    - Sonochemistry – study of the effect of sonic waves and wave properties on chemical systems.
    - Stereochemistry – study of the relative spatial arrangement of atoms within molecules.
    - Supramolecular chemistry – area of chemistry beyond the molecules and focuses on the chemical systems made up of a discrete number of assembled molecular subunits or components.
    - Thermochemistry – study of the energy and heat associated with chemical reactions and/or physical transformations.
  - Phytochemistry – strict sense of the word the study of phytochemicals.
  - Polymer chemistry – multidisciplinary science that deals with the chemical synthesis and chemical properties of polymers or macromolecules.
  - Solid-state chemistry – study of the synthesis, structure, and properties of solid phase materials, particularly, but not necessarily exclusively of, non-molecular solids
  - Multidisciplinary fields involving chemistry
    - Chemical biology – scientific discipline spanning the fields of chemistry and biology that involves the application of chemical techniques and tools, often compounds produced through synthetic chemistry, to the study and manipulation of biological systems.
    - Chemical engineering – branch of engineering that deals with physical science (e.g., chemistry and physics), and life sciences (e.g., biology, microbiology and biochemistry) with mathematics and economics, to the process of converting raw materials or chemicals into more useful or valuable forms.
    - Chemical oceanography – study of the behavior of the chemical elements within the Earth's oceans.
    - Chemical physics – branch of physics that studies chemical processes from the point of view of physics.
    - Materials science – interdisciplinary field applying the properties of matter to various areas of science and engineering.
    - Nanotechnology – study of manipulating matter on an atomic and molecular scale
    - Oenology – science and study of all aspects of wine and winemaking except vine-growing and grape-harvesting, which is a subfield called viticulture.
    - Spectroscopy – study of the interaction between matter and radiated energy
    - Surface science – Surface science is the study of physical and chemical phenomena that occur at the interface of two phases, including solid–liquid interfaces, solid–gas interfaces, solid–vacuum interfaces, and liquid–gas interfaces.

==== Earth science ====
- Earth science – all-embracing term for the sciences related to the planet Earth. Earth science, and all of its branches, are branches of physical science.
  - Atmospheric sciences – umbrella term for the study of the atmosphere, its processes, the effects other systems have on the atmosphere, and the effects of the atmosphere on these other systems.
    - Biogeography – study of the distribution of species (biology), organisms, and ecosystems in geographic space and through geological time.
    - Cartography – study and practice of making maps or globes.
    - Climatology – study of climate, scientifically defined as weather conditions averaged over a period of time
    - Coastal geography – study of the dynamic interface between the ocean and the land, incorporating both the physical geography (i.e. coastal geomorphology, geology and oceanography) and the human geography (sociology and history) of the coast.
    - Environmental science – an integrated, quantitative, and interdisciplinary approach to the study of environmental systems.Organismal Ecology: Studies how an individual organism behaves, grows, and responds to its surroundings. It looks at physical and behavioral adaptations for survival.
  - Ecology – the scientific study of the distribution and abundance of living organisms and how the distribution and abundance are affected by interactions between the organisms and their environment.
    - Conservation Ecology: Focuses on protecting, managing, and restoring damaged habitats and endangered species. It applies science to solve human-caused environmental problems.
    - Population Ecology: Focuses on a group of organisms of the same species living in one area. It tracks population size, growth, birth rates, and death rates.
    - Community Ecology: Examines how different species interact with each other inside a shared habitat. It studies competition, predator-prey dynamics, and biodiversity.
    - Ecosystem Ecology: Looks at both living (biotic) and non-living (abiotic) parts of an environment. It tracks how energy flows and nutrients cycle through nature.
    - Landscape Ecology: Analyzes ecological processes and spatial patterns across multiple connected ecosystems. It shows how energy and animals move across a broader region.
    - Global Ecology (Biosphere): Studies Earth as a single large system. It investigates planetary climate patterns, ocean currents, and global changes.
      - Environmental chemistry – Environmental chemistry is the scientific study of the chemical and biochemical phenomena that occur in natural places.
      - Environmental soil science – Environmental soil science is the study of the interaction of humans with the pedosphere as well as critical aspects of the biosphere, the lithosphere, the hydrosphere, and the atmosphere.
      - Environmental geology – Environmental geology, like hydrogeology, is an applied science concerned with the practical application of the principles of geology in the solving of environmental problems.
      - Geodesy – scientific discipline that deals with the measurement and representation of the Earth, including its gravitational field, in a three-dimensional time-varying space
  - Geography – science that studies the lands, features, inhabitants, and phenomena of Earth
  - Geoinformatics – science and the technology which develops and uses information science infrastructure to address the problems of geography, geosciences and related branches of engineering.
  - Geochemistry – branch of geology that studies the mechanisms of major geological systems (e.g. Earth's crust) using tools and principles of chemistry.
  - Geology – study of the Earth, with the general exclusion of present-day life, flow within the ocean, and the atmosphere.
    - Planetary geology – planetary science discipline concerned with the geology of the celestial bodies such as the planets and their moons, asteroids, comets, and meteorites.
  - Gemology
  - Geomorphology – scientific study of landforms and the processes that shape them
  - Geostatistics – branch of statistics focusing on spatial or spatiotemporal datasets
  - Geophysics – physics of the Earth and its environment in space; also the study of the Earth using quantitative physical methods.
  - Glaciology – study of glaciers, or more generally ice and natural phenomena that involve ice.
  - Hydrology – study of the movement, distribution, and quality of water on Earth and other planets, including the hydrologic cycle, water resources and environmental watershed sustainability.
  - Hydrogeology – area of geology that deals with the distribution and movement of groundwater in the soil and rocks of the Earth's crust (commonly in aquifers).
  - Mineralogy – branch of geology that studies chemistry, crystal structure, and physical (including optical) properties of minerals.
  - Meteorology – interdisciplinary scientific study of the atmosphere which explains and forecasts weather events.
  - Oceanography – branch of Earth science that studies the ocean including ocean life, environment, geography, weather, and other aspects influencing the ocean
  - Paleoclimatology – study of changes in climate taken on the scale of the entire history of Earth
  - Paleontology – study of prehistoric life
  - Petrology – branch of geology that studies the origin, composition, distribution and structure of rocks.
  - Limnology – study of inland waters
  - Seismology – scientific study of earthquakes and the propagation of elastic waves through the Earth or through other planet-like bodies
  - Soil science – study of soil as a natural resource on the surface of the earth including soil formation, classification and mapping; physical, chemical, biological, and fertility properties of soils; and these properties in relation to the use and management of soils.
  - Topography – study of surface shape and features of the Earth and other observable astronomical objects including planets, moons, and asteroids.
  - Volcanology – study of volcanoes, lava, magma, and related geological, geophysical and geochemical phenomena.

=== Life science ===
==== Biology ====
- Biology – study of living organisms.
  - Aerobiology – study of airborne organic particles
  - Agriculture – study of producing crops from the land, with an emphasis on practical applications
  - Anatomy – study of form and function, in plants, animals, and other organisms, or specifically in humans
    - Human anatomy – scientific study of the morphology of the adult human.
  - Biochemistry – study of the chemical reactions required for life to exist and function, usually a focus on the cellular level
  - Bioengineering – study of biology through the means of engineering with an emphasis on applied knowledge and especially related to biotechnology
  - Biogeography – study of the distribution of species spatially and temporally
  - Bioinformatics – use of information technology and statistics for the study, collection, and storage of genomic and other biological data
  - Biomathematics or mathematical biology – quantitative or mathematical study of biological processes, with an emphasis on modeling
  - Biomechanics – often considered a branch of medicine, the study of the mechanics of living beings, with an emphasis on applied use through prosthetics or orthotics
  - Biomedical sciences
  - Biomedical research – study of the human body in health and disease
    - Clinical research
  - Biophysics – study of biological processes through physics, by applying the theories and methods traditionally used in the physical sciences
  - Biotechnology – new and sometimes controversial branch of biology that studies the manipulation of living matter, including genetic modification and synthetic biology
  - Botany – study of plants
  - Cell biology – study of the cell as a complete unit, and the molecular and chemical interactions that occur within a living cell
  - Conservation biology – study of the preservation, protection, or restoration of the natural environment, natural ecosystems, vegetation, and wildlife
  - Chronobiology – field of biology that examines periodic (cyclic) phenomena in living organisms and their adaptation to solar- and lunar-related rhythms.
  - Cryobiology – study of the effects of lower than normally preferred temperatures on living beings.
  - Developmental biology – study of the processes through which an organism forms, from zygote to full structure
    - Embryology – study of the development of embryo (from fecundation to birth). See also topobiology.
    - Gerontology – study of aging processes.
  - Ecology – study of the interactions of living organisms with one another and with the non-living elements of their environment or else scientific study of the distribution and abundance of living organisms and how the distribution and abundance are affected by interactions between the organisms and their environment.
    - Population Ecology: Focuses on a group of organisms of the same species living in one area. It tracks population size, growth, birth rates, and death rates.
    - Community Ecology: Examines how different species interact with each other inside a shared habitat. It studies competition, predator-prey dynamics, and biodiversity.
    - Conservation Ecology: Focuses on protecting, managing, and restoring damaged habitats and endangered species. It applies science to solve human-caused environmental problems.
    - Ecosystem Ecology: Looks at both living (biotic) and non-living (abiotic) parts of an environment. It tracks how energy flows and nutrients cycle through nature.
    - Landscape Ecology: Analyzes ecological processes and spatial patterns across multiple connected ecosystems. It shows how energy and animals move across a broader region.
    - Global Ecology (Biosphere): Studies Earth as a single large system. It investigates planetary climate patterns, ocean currents, and global changes.
  - Environmental biology – study of the natural world, as a whole or in a particular area, especially as affected by human activity.
    - Freshwater biology – scientific biological study of freshwater ecosystems and is a branch of Limnology
    - Marine biology – scientific study of organisms in the ocean or other marine or brackish bodies of water
    - Parasitology – Parasitology is the study of parasites, their hosts, and the relationship between them.
    - Population dynamics – Population dynamics is the branch of life sciences that studies short-term and long-term changes in the size and age composition of populations, and the biological and environmental processes influencing those changes.
  - Epidemiology – major component of public health research, studying factors affecting the health of populations
  - Evolution – any change across successive generations in the heritable characteristics of biological populations.
    - Evolutionary biology – study of the origin and descent of species over time
      - Evolutionary developmental biology – field of biology that compares the developmental processes of different organisms to determine the ancestral relationship between them, and to discover how developmental processes evolved.
    - Paleobiology – discipline which combines the methods and findings of the natural science biology with the methods and findings of the earth science paleontology.
      - Paleontology – study of fossils and sometimes geographic evidence of prehistoric life
  - Genetics – study of genes and heredity
    - Genomics – discipline in genetics concerned with the study of the genomes of organisms.
    - Proteomics – large-scale study of proteins, particularly their structures and functions
    - Population genetics – study of changes in gene frequencies in
  - Histology – study of cells and tissues, a microscopic branch of anatomy
  - Integrative biology – study of whole organisms
  - Limnology – study of inland waters
  - Marine biology – study of ocean ecosystems, plants, animals, and other living beings
  - Microbiology – study of microscopic organisms (microorganisms) and their interactions with other living things
    - Bacteriology – study of bacteria.
    - Virology – study of viruses and some other virus-like agents
  - Molecular biology – study of biology and biological functions at the molecular level, some cross over with biochemistry
    - Structural biology – branch of molecular biology, biochemistry, and biophysics concerned with the molecular structure of biological macromolecules
  - Morphology – In biology, morphology is a branch of bioscience dealing with the study of the form and structure of organisms and their specific structural features.
  - Mycology – study of fungi
  - Oncology – study of cancer processes, including virus or mutation oncogenesis, angiogenesis and tissues remoldings
  - Population biology – study of groups of conspecific organisms, including
    - Population ecology – study of how population dynamics and extinction
    - Population genetics – study of changes in gene frequencies in populations of organisms
  - Pathobiology or pathology – study of diseases, and the causes, processes, nature, and development of disease
  - Parasitology – study of parasites and parasitism
  - Pharmacology – study and practical application of preparation, use, and effects of drugs and synthetic medicines.
    - Toxicology – branch of biology, chemistry, and medicine concerned with the study of the adverse effects of chemicals on living organisms.
  - Physiology (Outline) – study of the functioning of living organisms and the organs and parts of living organisms.
    - Immunology – Immunology is the study of all aspects of the immune system in all organisms
    - Kinesiology – Kinesiology, also known as human kinetics, is the scientific study of human movement
    - Neurobiology – study of the nervous system, including anatomy, physiology and pathology
      - Neuroscience – interdisciplinary science that studies the nervous system
    - Histology –
  - Phytopathology – study of plant diseases (also called plant pathology)
  - Psychobiology – study of the biological bases of psychology
  - Sociobiology – study of the biological bases of sociology
  - Systematics – study of the diversification of living forms, both past and present, and the relationships among living things through time
    - Cladistics – method of classifying species of organisms into groups called clades, which consist of an ancestor organism and all its descendants (and nothing else)
    - Phylogeny – study of evolutionary relation among groups of organisms (e.g. species, populations), which is discovered through molecular sequencing data and morphological data matrices
    - Taxonomy – science of identifying and naming species, and arranging them into a classification.
  - Zoology – study of animals, including classification, physiology, development, and behavior
    - Arachnology – scientific study of spiders and related animals such as scorpions, pseudoscorpions, harvestmen, collectively called arachnids.
      - Acarology – study of the taxon of arachnids that contains mites and ticks
    - Entomology – study of insects
      - Myrmecology – scientific study of ants, a branch of entomology
      - Coleopterology – study of beetles
      - Lepidopterology – study of a large order of insects that includes moths and butterflies (called lepidopterans)
    - Ethology – study of animal behavior
    - Helminthology – study of worms, especially parasitic worms
    - Herpetology – study of reptiles and amphibians
    - Ichthyology – study of fish
    - Malacology – branch of invertebrate zoology which deals with the study of the Mollusca (mollusks or molluscs), the second-largest phylum of animals in terms of described species after the arthropods.
    - Mammalogy – study of mammals
      - Cetology – branch of marine mammal science that studies the approximately eighty species of whales, dolphins, and porpoise in the scientific order Cetacea.
      - Physical anthropology – studies the physical development of the human species.
    - Nematology – scientific discipline concerned with the study of nematodes, or roundworms
    - Ornithology – study of birds

== History of natural science ==
=== History of the branches of natural science ===
- Natural philosophy
- History of physical science – history of the branch of natural science that studies non-living systems, in contrast to the biological sciences. It in turn has many branches, each referred to as a "physical science", together called the "physical sciences". However, the term "physical" creates an unintended, somewhat arbitrary distinction, since many branches of physical science also study biological phenomena (organic chemistry, for example).
  - History of physics – history of the physical science that studies matter and its motion through space-time, and related concepts such as energy and force
    - History of acoustics – history of the study of mechanical waves in solids, liquids, and gases (such as vibration and sound)
    - History of agrophysics – history of the study of physics applied to agroecosystems
      - History of soil physics – history of the study of soil physical properties and processes.
    - History of astrophysics – history of the study of the physical aspects of celestial objects
    - History of astronomy – history of the studies the universe beyond Earth, including its formation and development, and the evolution, physics, chemistry, meteorology, and motion of celestial objects (such as galaxies, planets, etc.) and phenomena that originate outside the atmosphere of Earth (such as the cosmic background radiation).
      - History of astrodynamics – history of the application of ballistics and celestial mechanics to the practical problems concerning the motion of rockets and other spacecraft.
      - History of astrometry – history of the branch of astronomy that involves precise measurements of the positions and movements of stars and other celestial bodies.
      - History of cosmology – history of the discipline that deals with the nature of the Universe as a whole.
      - History of extragalactic astronomy – history of the branch of astronomy concerned with objects outside our own Milky Way Galaxy
      - History of galactic astronomy – history of the study of our own Milky Way galaxy and all its contents.
      - History of physical cosmology – history of the study of the largest-scale structures and dynamics of the universe and is concerned with fundamental questions about its formation and evolution.
      - History of planetary science – history of the scientific study of planets (including Earth), moons, and planetary systems, in particular those of the Solar System and the processes that form them.
      - History of stellar astronomy – history of the natural science that deals with the study of celestial objects (such as stars, planets, comets, nebulae, star clusters and galaxies) and phenomena that originate outside the atmosphere of Earth (such as cosmic background radiation)
    - History of atmospheric physics – history of the study of the application of physics to the atmosphere
    - History of atomic, molecular, and optical physics – history of the study of how matter and light interact
    - History of biophysics – history of the study of physical processes relating to biology
      - History of medical physics – history of the application of physics concepts, theories and methods to medicine.
      - History of neurophysics – history of the branch of biophysics dealing with the nervous system.
    - History of chemical physics – history of the branch of physics that studies chemical processes from the point of view of physics.
    - History of computational physics – history of the study and implementation of numerical algorithms to solve problems in physics for which a quantitative theory already exists.
    - History of condensed matter physics – history of the study of the physical properties of condensed phases of matter.
    - History of cryogenics – history of the cryogenics is the study of the production of very low temperature (below −150 °C, −238 °F or 123K) and the behavior of materials at those temperatures.
    - History of dynamics – history of the study of the causes of motion and changes in motion
    - History of econophysics – history of the interdisciplinary research field, applying theories and methods originally developed by physicists in order to solve problems in economics
    - History of electromagnetism – history of the branch of science concerned with the forces that occur between electrically charged particles.
    - History of geophysics – history of the physics of the Earth and its environment in space; also the study of the Earth using quantitative physical methods
    - History of materials physics – history of the use of physics to describe materials in many different ways such as force, heat, light and mechanics.
    - History of mathematical physics – history of the application of mathematics to problems in physics and the development of mathematical methods for such applications and for the formulation of physical theories.
    - History of mechanics – history of the branch of physics concerned with the behavior of physical bodies when subjected to forces or displacements, and the subsequent effects of the bodies on their environment.
      - History of biomechanics – history of the study of the structure and function of biological systems such as humans, animals, plants, organs, and cells by means of the methods of mechanics.
      - History of classical mechanics – history of one of the two major sub-fields of mechanics, which is concerned with the set of physical laws describing the motion of bodies under the action of a system of forces.
      - History of continuum mechanics – history of the branch of mechanics that deals with the analysis of the kinematics and the mechanical behavior of materials modeled as a continuous mass rather than as discrete particles.
      - History of fluid mechanics – history of the study of fluids and the forces on them.
      - History of quantum mechanics – history of the branch of physics dealing with physical phenomena where the action is on the order of the Planck constant.
      - History of thermodynamics – history of the branch of physical science concerned with heat and its relation to other forms of energy and work.
    - History of nuclear physics – history of the field of physics that studies the building blocks and interactions of atomic nuclei.
    - History of optics – history of the branch of physics which involves the behavior and properties of light, including its interactions with matter and the construction of instruments that use or detect it.
    - History of particle physics – history of the branch of physics that studies the existence and interactions of particles that are the constituents of what is usually referred to as matter or radiation.
    - History of psychophysics – history of the quantitatively investigates the relationship between physical stimuli and the sensations and perceptions they affect.
    - History of plasma physics – history of the state of matter similar to gas in which a certain portion of the particles are ionized.
    - History of polymer physics – history of the field of physics that studies polymers, their fluctuations, mechanical properties, as well as the kinetics of reactions involving degradation and polymerisation of polymers and monomers respectively.
    - History of quantum physics – history of the branch of physics dealing with physical phenomena where the action is on the order of the Planck constant.
    - Relativity –
    - History of statics – history of the branch of mechanics concerned with the analysis of loads (force, torque/moment) on physical systems in static equilibrium, that is, in a state where the relative positions of subsystems do not vary over time, or where components and structures are at a constant velocity.
    - History of solid state physics – history of the study of rigid matter, or solids, through methods such as quantum mechanics, crystallography, electromagnetism, and metallurgy.
    - History of vehicle dynamics – history of the dynamics of vehicles, here assumed to be ground vehicles.
  - History of chemistry – history of the physical science of atomic matter (matter that is composed of chemical elements), especially its chemical reactions, but also including its properties, structure, composition, behavior, and changes as they relate the chemical reactions
    - History of analytical chemistry – history of the study of the separation, identification, and quantification of the chemical components of natural and artificial materials.
    - History of astrochemistry – history of the study of the abundance and reactions of chemical elements and molecules in the universe, and their interaction with radiation.
      - History of cosmochemistry – history of the study of the chemical composition of matter in the universe and the processes that led to those compositions
    - History of atmospheric chemistry – history of the branch of atmospheric science in which the chemistry of the Earth's atmosphere and that of other planets is studied. It is a multidisciplinary field of research and draws on environmental chemistry, physics, meteorology, computer modeling, oceanography, geology and volcanology and other disciplines
    - History of biochemistry – history of the study of chemical processes in living organisms, including, but not limited to, living matter. Biochemistry governs all living organisms and living processes.
      - History of agrochemistry – history of the study of both chemistry and biochemistry which are important in agricultural production, the processing of raw products into foods and beverages, and in environmental monitoring and remediation.
      - History of bioinorganic chemistry – history of the examines the role of metals in biology.
      - History of bioorganic chemistry – history of the rapidly growing scientific discipline that combines organic chemistry and biochemistry.
      - History of biophysical chemistry – history of the new branch of chemistry that covers a broad spectrum of research activities involving biological systems.
      - History of environmental chemistry – history of the scientific study of the chemical and biochemical phenomena that occur in natural places.
      - History of immunochemistry – history of the branch of chemistry that involves the study of the reactions and components on the immune system.
      - History of medicinal chemistry – history of the discipline at the intersection of chemistry, especially synthetic organic chemistry, and pharmacology and various other biological specialties, where they are involved with design, chemical synthesis and development for market of pharmaceutical agents (drugs).
      - History of pharmacology – history of the branch of medicine and biology concerned with the study of drug action.
      - History of natural product chemistry – history of the chemical compound or substance produced by a living organism – history of the found in nature that usually has a pharmacological or biological activity for use in pharmaceutical drug discovery and drug design.
      - History of neurochemistry – history of the specific study of neurochemicals, which include neurotransmitters and other molecules such as neuro-active drugs that influence neuron function.
    - History of computational chemistry – history of the branch of chemistry that uses principles of computer science to assist in solving chemical problems.
      - History of cheminformatics – history of the use of computer and informational techniques, applied to a range of problems in the field of chemistry.
      - History of molecular mechanics – history of the uses Newtonian mechanics to model molecular systems.
    - History of flavor chemistry – history of the someone who uses chemistry to engineer artificial and natural flavors.
    - History of flow chemistry – history of the chemical reaction is run in a continuously flowing stream rather than in batch production.
    - History of geochemistry – history of the study of the mechanisms behind major geological systems using chemistry
      - History of aqueous geochemistry – history of the study of the role of various elements in watersheds, including copper, sulfur, mercury, and how elemental fluxes are exchanged through atmospheric-terrestrial-aquatic interactions
      - History of isotope geochemistry – history of the study of the relative and absolute concentrations of the elements and their isotopes using chemistry and geology
      - History of ocean chemistry – history of the studies the chemistry of marine environments including the influences of different variables.
      - History of organic geochemistry – history of the study of the impacts and processes that organisms have had on Earth
      - History of regional, environmental and exploration geochemistry – history of the study of the spatial variation in the chemical composition of materials at the surface of the Earth
    - History of inorganic chemistry – history of the branch of chemistry concerned with the properties and behavior of inorganic compounds.
    - History of nuclear chemistry – history of the subfield of chemistry dealing with radioactivity, nuclear processes and nuclear properties.
      - History of radiochemistry – history of the chemistry of radioactive materials, where radioactive isotopes of elements are used to study the properties and chemical reactions of non-radioactive isotopes (often within radiochemistry the absence of radioactivity leads to a substance being described as being inactive as the isotopes are stable).
    - History of organic chemistry – history of the study of the structure, properties, composition, reactions, and preparation (by synthesis or by other means) of carbon-based compounds, hydrocarbons, and their derivatives.
      - History of petrochemistry – history of the branch of chemistry that studies the transformation of crude oil (petroleum) and natural gas into useful products or raw materials.
    - History of organometallic chemistry – history of the study of chemical compounds containing bonds between carbon and a metal.
    - History of photochemistry – history of the study of chemical reactions that proceed with the absorption of light by atoms or molecules..
    - History of physical chemistry – history of the study of macroscopic, atomic, subatomic, and particulate phenomena in chemical systems in terms of physical laws and concepts.
      - History of chemical kinetics – history of the study of rates of chemical processes.
      - History of chemical thermodynamics – history of the study of the interrelation of heat and work with chemical reactions or with physical changes of state within the confines of the laws of thermodynamics.
      - History of electrochemistry – history of the branch of chemistry that studies chemical reactions which take place in a solution at the interface of an electron conductor (a metal or a semiconductor) and an ionic conductor (the electrolyte), and which involve electron transfer between the electrode and the electrolyte or species in solution.
      - History of Femtochemistry – history of the Femtochemistry is the science that studies chemical reactions on extremely short timescales, approximately 10^{−15} seconds (one femtosecond, hence the name).
      - History of mathematical chemistry – history of the area of research engaged in novel applications of mathematics to chemistry; it concerns itself principally with the mathematical modeling of chemical phenomena.
      - History of mechanochemistry – history of the coupling of the mechanical and the chemical phenomena on a molecular scale and includes mechanical breakage, chemical behaviour of mechanically stressed solids (e.g., stress-corrosion cracking), tribology, polymer degradation under shear, cavitation-related phenomena (e.g., sonochemistry and sonoluminescence), shock wave chemistry and physics, and even the burgeoning field of molecular machines.
      - History of physical organic chemistry – history of the study of the interrelationships between structure and reactivity in organic molecules.
      - History of quantum chemistry – history of the branch of chemistry whose primary focus is the application of quantum mechanics in physical models and experiments of chemical systems.
      - History of sonochemistry – history of the study of the effect of sonic waves and wave properties on chemical systems.
      - History of stereochemistry – history of the study of the relative spatial arrangement of atoms within molecules.
      - History of supramolecular chemistry – history of the area of chemistry beyond the molecules and focuses on the chemical systems made up of a discrete number of assembled molecular subunits or components.
      - History of thermochemistry – history of the study of the energy and heat associated with chemical reactions and/or physical transformations.
    - History of phytochemistry – history of the strict sense of the word the study of phytochemicals.
    - History of polymer chemistry – history of the multidisciplinary science that deals with the chemical synthesis and chemical properties of polymers or macromolecules.
    - History of solid-state chemistry – history of the study of the synthesis, structure, and properties of solid phase materials, particularly, but not necessarily exclusively of, non-molecular solids
    - Multidisciplinary fields involving chemistry
      - History of chemical biology – history of the scientific discipline spanning the fields of chemistry and biology that involves the application of chemical techniques and tools, often compounds produced through synthetic chemistry, to the study and manipulation of biological systems.
      - History of chemical engineering – history of the branch of engineering that deals with physical science (e.g., chemistry and physics), and life sciences (e.g., biology, microbiology and biochemistry) with mathematics and economics, to the process of converting raw materials or chemicals into more useful or valuable forms.
      - History of chemical oceanography – history of the study of the behavior of the chemical elements within the Earth's oceans.
      - History of chemical physics – history of the branch of physics that studies chemical processes from the point of view of physics.
      - History of materials science – history of the interdisciplinary field applying the properties of matter to various areas of science and engineering.
      - History of nanotechnology – history of the study of manipulating matter on an atomic and molecular scale
      - History of oenology – history of the science and study of all aspects of wine and winemaking except vine-growing and grape-harvesting, which is a subfield called viticulture.
      - History of spectroscopy – history of the study of the interaction between matter and radiated energy
      - History of surface science – history of the Surface science is the study of physical and chemical phenomena that occur at the interface of two phases, including solid–liquid interfaces, solid–gas interfaces, solid–vacuum interfaces, and liquid–gas interfaces.
  - History of earth science – history of the all-embracing term for the sciences related to the planet Earth. Earth science, and all of its branches, are branches of physical science.
    - History of atmospheric sciences – history of the umbrella term for the study of the atmosphere, its processes, the effects other systems have on the atmosphere, and the effects of the atmosphere on these other systems.
    - History of biogeography – history of the study of the distribution of species (biology), organisms, and ecosystems in geographic space and through geological time.
    - History of cartography – history of the study and practice of making maps or globes.
    - History of climatology – history of the study of climate, scientifically defined as weather conditions averaged over a period of time
    - History of coastal geography – history of the study of the dynamic interface between the ocean and the land, incorporating both the physical geography (i.e. coastal geomorphology, geology and oceanography) and the human geography (sociology and history) of the coast.
    - History of environmental science – history of an integrated, quantitative, and interdisciplinary approach to the study of environmental systems.
      - History of ecology – history of the scientific study of the distribution and abundance of living organisms and how the distribution and abundance are affected by interactions between the organisms and their environment.
        - History of freshwater biology – history of the scientific biological study of freshwater ecosystems and is a branch of Limnology
        - History of marine biology – history of the scientific study of organisms in the ocean or other marine or brackish bodies of water
        - History of parasitology – history of the Parasitology is the study of parasites, their hosts, and the relationship between them.
        - History of population dynamics – history of the Population dynamics is the branch of life sciences that studies short-term and long-term changes in the size and age composition of populations, and the biological and environmental processes influencing those changes.
      - History of environmental chemistry – history of the Environmental chemistry is the scientific study of the chemical and biochemical phenomena that occur in natural places.
      - History of environmental soil science – history of the Environmental soil science is the study of the interaction of humans with the pedosphere as well as critical aspects of the biosphere, the lithosphere, the hydrosphere, and the atmosphere.
      - History of environmental geology – history of the Environmental geology, like hydrogeology, is an applied science concerned with the practical application of the principles of geology in the solving of environmental problems.
      - History of toxicology – history of the branch of biology, chemistry, and medicine concerned with the study of the adverse effects of chemicals on living organisms.
    - History of geodesy – history of the scientific discipline that deals with the measurement and representation of the Earth, including its gravitational field, in a three-dimensional time-varying space
    - History of geography – history of the science that studies the lands, features, inhabitants, and phenomena of Earth
    - History of geoinformatics – history of the science and the technology which develops and uses information science infrastructure to address the problems of geography, geosciences and related branches of engineering.
    - History of geology – history of the study of the Earth, with the general exclusion of present-day life, flow within the ocean, and the atmosphere.
      - History of planetary geology – history of the planetary science discipline concerned with the geology of the celestial bodies such as the planets and their moons, asteroids, comets, and meteorites.
    - History of geomorphology – history of the scientific study of landforms and the processes that shape them
    - History of geostatistics – history of the branch of statistics focusing on spatial or spatiotemporal datasets
    - History of geophysics – history of the physics of the Earth and its environment in space; also the study of the Earth using quantitative physical methods.
    - History of glaciology – history of the study of glaciers, or more generally ice and natural phenomena that involve ice.
    - History of hydrology – history of the study of the movement, distribution, and quality of water on Earth and other planets, including the hydrologic cycle, water resources and environmental watershed sustainability.
    - History of hydrogeology – history of the area of geology that deals with the distribution and movement of groundwater in the soil and rocks of the Earth's crust (commonly in aquifers).
    - History of mineralogy – history of the study of chemistry, crystal structure, and physical (including optical) properties of minerals.
    - History of meteorology – history of the interdisciplinary scientific study of the atmosphere which explains and forecasts weather events.
    - History of oceanography – history of the branch of Earth science that studies the ocean
    - History of paleoclimatology – history of the study of changes in climate taken on the scale of the entire history of Earth
    - History of paleontology – history of the study of prehistoric life
    - History of petrology – history of the branch of geology that studies the origin, composition, distribution and structure of rocks.
    - History of limnology – history of the study of inland waters
    - History of seismology – history of the scientific study of earthquakes and the propagation of elastic waves through the Earth or through other planet-like bodies
    - History of soil science – history of the study of soil as a natural resource on the surface of the earth including soil formation, classification and mapping; physical, chemical, biological, and fertility properties of soils; and these properties in relation to the use and management of soils.
    - History of topography – history of the study of surface shape and features of the Earth and other observable astronomical objects including planets, moons, and asteroids.
    - History of volcanology – history of the study of volcanoes, lava, magma, and related geological, geophysical and geochemical phenomena.
- History of biology – history of the study of living organisms.
  - History of aerobiology – history of the study of airborne organic particles
  - History of agriculture – history of the study of producing crops from the land, with an emphasis on practical applications
  - History of anatomy – history of the study of form and function, in plants, animals, and other organisms, or specifically in humans
    - History of human anatomy – history of the scientific study of the morphology of the adult human.
  - History of astrobiology – history of the study of evolution, distribution, and future of life in the universe—also known as exobiology, exopaleontology, and bioastronomy
  - History of biochemistry – history of the study of the chemical reactions required for life to exist and function, usually a focus on the cellular level
  - History of bioengineering – history of the study of biology through the means of engineering with an emphasis on applied knowledge and especially related to biotechnology
  - History of biogeography – history of the study of the distribution of species spatially and temporally
  - History of bioinformatics – history of the use of information technology for the study, collection, and storage of genomic and other biological data
  - History of biomathematics – history of the quantitative or mathematical study of biological processes, with an emphasis on modeling
  - History of biomechanics – history of the often considered a branch of medicine, the study of the mechanics of living beings, with an emphasis on applied use through prosthetics or orthotics
  - History of biomedical research – history of the study of the human body in health and disease
  - History of biophysics – history of the study of biological processes through physics, by applying the theories and methods traditionally used in the physical sciences
  - History of biotechnology – history of the new and sometimes controversial branch of biology that studies the manipulation of living matter, including genetic modification and synthetic biology
  - History of building biology – history of the study of the indoor living environment
  - History of botany – history of the study of plants
  - History of cell biology – history of the study of the cell as a complete unit, and the molecular and chemical interactions that occur within a living cell
  - History of conservation biology – history of the study of the preservation, protection, or restoration of the natural environment, natural ecosystems, vegetation, and wildlife
  - History of chronobiology – history of the field of biology that examines periodic (cyclic) phenomena in living organisms and their adaptation to solar- and lunar-related rhythms.
  - History of cryobiology – history of the study of the effects of lower than normally preferred temperatures on living beings.
  - History of developmental biology – history of the study of the processes through which an organism forms, from zygote to full structure
    - History of embryology – history of the study of the development of embryo (from fecundation to birth). See also topobiology.
    - History of gerontology – history of the study of aging processes.
  - History of ecology – history of the study of the interactions of living organisms with one another and with the non-living elements of their environment
  - History of environmental biology – history of the study of the natural world, as a whole or in a particular area, especially as affected by human activity
  - History of epidemiology – history of the major component of public health research, studying factors affecting the health of populations
  - History of evolution – history of the any change across successive generations in the heritable characteristics of biological populations.
    - History of evolutionary biology – history of the study of the origin and descent of species over time
      - History of evolutionary developmental biology – history of the field of biology that compares the developmental processes of different organisms to determine the ancestral relationship between them, and to discover how developmental processes evolved.
    - History of paleobiology – history of the discipline which combines the methods and findings of the natural science biology with the methods and findings of the earth science paleontology.
      - History of paleontology – history of the study of fossils and sometimes geographic evidence of prehistoric life
  - History of genetics – history of the study of genes and heredity
    - History of genomics – history of the discipline in genetics concerned with the study of the genomes of organisms.
    - History of proteomics – history of the large-scale study of proteins, particularly their structures and functions
    - History of population genetics – history of the study of changes in gene frequencies in
  - History of histology – history of the study of cells and tissues, a microscopic branch of anatomy
  - History of integrative biology – history of the study of whole organisms
  - History of limnology – history of the study of inland waters
  - History of marine biology – history of the study of ocean ecosystems, plants, animals, and other living beings
  - History of microbiology – history of the study of microscopic organisms (microorganisms) and their interactions with other living things
    - History of bacteriology – history of the study of bacteria.
    - History of virology – history of the study of viruses and some other virus-like agents
  - History of molecular biology – history of the study of biology and biological functions at the molecular level, some cross over with biochemistry
    - History of structural biology – history of the branch of molecular biology, biochemistry, and biophysics concerned with the molecular structure of biological macromolecules
  - History of morphology – history of the In biology, morphology is a branch of bioscience dealing with the study of the form and structure of organisms and their specific structural features.
  - History of mycology – history of the study of fungi
  - History of oceanography – history of the study of the ocean, including ocean life, environment, geography, weather, and other aspects influencing the ocean
  - History of oncology – history of the study of cancer processes, including virus or mutation oncogenesis, angiogenesis and tissues remoldings
  - History of population biology – history of the study of groups of conspecific organisms, including
    - History of population ecology – history of the study of how population dynamics and extinction
    - History of population genetics – history of the study of changes in gene frequencies in populations of organisms
  - Pathobiology or pathology – history of the study of diseases, and the causes, processes, nature, and development of disease
  - History of parasitology – history of the study of parasites and parasitism
  - History of pharmacology – history of the study and practical application of preparation, use, and effects of drugs and synthetic medicines
  - History of physiology – history of the study of the functioning of living organisms and the organs and parts of living organisms
    - History of immunology –
    - History of kinesiology – history of the Kinesiology, also known as human kinetics, is the scientific study of human movement
    - History of neurobiology – history of the study of the nervous system, including anatomy, physiology and pathology
      - History of neuroscience – history of the interdisciplinary science that studies the nervous system
    - History of histology –
  - History of phytopathology – history of the study of plant diseases (also called Plant Pathology)
  - History of psychobiology – history of the study of the biological bases of psychology
  - History of sociobiology – history of the study of the biological bases of sociology
  - History of systematics – history of the study of the diversification of living forms, both past and present, and the relationships among living things through time
    - History of cladistics – history of the method of classifying species of organisms into groups called clades, which consist of an ancestor organism and all its descendants (and nothing else)
    - History of phylogeny – history of the study of evolutionary relation among groups of organisms (e.g. species, populations), which is discovered through molecular sequencing data and morphological data matrices
    - History of taxonomy – history of the science of identifying and naming species, and arranging them into a classification.
  - History of zoology – history of the study of animals, including classification, physiology, development, and behavior
    - History of arachnology – history of the scientific study of spiders and related animals such as scorpions, pseudoscorpions, harvestmen, collectively called arachnids.
      - History of acarology – history of the study of the taxon of arachnids that contains mites and ticks
    - History of entomology – history of the study of insects
      - Timeline of entomology
      - History of myrmecology – history of the scientific study of ants, a branch of entomology
      - History of coleopterology – history of the study of beetles
      - History of lepidopterology – history of the study of a large order of insects that includes moths and butterflies (called lepidopterans)
    - History of ethology – history of the study of animal behavior
    - History of helminthology – history of the study of worms, especially parasitic worms
    - History of herpetology – history of the study of reptiles and amphibians
    - History of ichthyology – history of the study of fish
    - History of malacology – history of the branch of invertebrate zoology which deals with the study of the Mollusca (mollusks or molluscs), the second-largest phylum of animals in terms of described species after the arthropods.
    - History of mammalogy – history of the study of mammals
      - History of biological anthropology – history of the studies the physical development of the human species. Also called physical anthropology.
      - History of cetology – history of the branch of marine mammal science that studies the approximately eighty species of whales, dolphins, and porpoise in the scientific order Cetacea.
    - History of nematology – history of the scientific discipline concerned with the study of nematodes, or roundworms
    - History of ornithology – history of the study of birds

== General natural science concepts ==
- Discovery science
- Empirical evidence
- Experiment
- Hypothesis
- Laboratory
- Nature
- Occam's razor
- Peer review
- Physical law
- Reproducibility
- Scientific evidence
- Scientific method
- Scientific theory
- Testability
- Universe
- Validity

== Natural science publications ==
- Physical science journals
  - List of astronomy journals
  - List of chemistry journals
  - List of earth and atmospheric sciences journals
  - List of physics journals
- List of biology journals
  - List of botany journals
  - List of zoology journals

== Persons influential in natural science ==
- List of physicists
  - List of biophysicists
  - List of geophysicists
- List of astronomers
  - List of cosmologists
- List of chemists
  - List of biochemists
  - List of neurochemists
  - List of electrochemists
- List of earth scientists
  - List of Russian earth scientists
  - List of cartographers
  - List of climatologists
  - List of geographers
  - List of geologists
  - List of geophysicists
  - List of glaciologists
  - List of mineralogists
  - List of meteorologists
  - List of paleontologists
  - List of soil scientists
- List of biologists
  - List of botanists by author abbreviation
  - List of carcinologists
  - List of coleopterists
  - List of ecologists
  - List of malacologists
  - List of mammalogists
  - List of mycologists
  - List of ornithologists
  - List of pathologists
  - List of zoologists by author abbreviation
  - List of Nobel Prize winners in physiology or medicine

== See also ==
- Outline of science
  - Outline of natural science
    - Outline of physical science
      - Outline of earth science
  - Outline of formal science
  - Outline of social science
  - Outline of applied science
