= Geohistory =

Geohistory may refer to:

- sub-disciplines of geography such as
  - Historical geography – changes to geographical aspects of particular societies and environments;
- sub-disciplines of geology, such as
  - Historical geology – a discipline concerned mainly with
    - the geological history of the Earth itself;
- genres of history, such as
  - Geographical history – the influence of geographical factors on human history,
  - History of geodesy – development of the discipline concerned mainly with the Earth's overall shape, orientation in space, and gravitational field),
  - History of geography – changes in human knowledge of geography,
  - History of geology – development of the discipline concerned mainly with the origin, history, and structure of the Earth, and
  - History of geophysics – development of the discipline concerned mainly with physical processes that shape the Earth.
- Histoire Géo – An animated history channel whose English version is called Geo History.
