= Natural science (disambiguation) =

Natural science is a branch of science concerning life sciences and physical sciences.

Natural science(s) may also refer to:

- Natural Science, academic journal published by Scientific Research Publishing
- Natural Sciences Tripos, series of courses at the University of Cambridge
- "Natural Science" (song), by the band Rush

== See also ==
- List of natural history museums
- Outline of natural science
