= Outline of science =

Overview of and topical guide to science

The following outline is provided as a topical overview of science:

Science is a systematic discipline that builds and organises knowledge in the form of testable hypotheses and predictions about the universe. Modern science is typically divided into two – or three – major branches: the natural sciences, which study the physical world, and the social sciences, which study individuals and societies. While referred to as the formal sciences, the study of logic, mathematics, and theoretical computer science are typically regarded as separate because they rely on deductive reasoning instead of the scientific method as their main methodology. Meanwhile, applied sciences are disciplines that use scientific knowledge for practical purposes, such as engineering and medicine.

== Study and experimentation ==
Experimentation is the use of controlled conditions to test an idea. A single independent variable is altered while all other conditions are kept the same to test the alteration's effect on a dependent variable.

- Design of experiments
- History of experiments
- Descriptive and normative science are contrasting methods to explain scientific ideas. Descriptive science explains ideas objectively while normative science explains what should be true using value judgments.
- Empirical research is conducted using observation and experimentation instead of theory.
  - Empirical evidence is evidence gathered through direct observation instead of indirect theory.
- Falsifiability is the ability to test a hypothesis through experimentation to determine whether it is false. Karl Popper argued that a claim must be falsifiable to be recognized as scientific.
- Hard and soft science are descriptions of how measurable and precise a branch of science is. Hard sciences like biology and physics are more measurable while soft sciences like anthropology and psychology are less measurable.
- Laboratories are places where scientists engage in research and study.
- Measurement is the use of precise units to describe a quantity.
- Models are representations of scientific phenomena to assist in studying or explaining them.
- Observations are the use of one's senses to obtain information, and the resulting discoveries.
  - Observational studies are a type of research conducted solely by observing without controlling variables or testing specific hypotheses.
- Reproducibility or replicability is the ability for subsequent experiments to confirm the accuracy of previous ones by producing the same result. This may be through an identical experiment or a test of the same hypothesis under different conditions.
- Prediction is the use of observation to determine future results through inference.
- The scientific method is a series of steps taken to engage in experimentation and produce factual results. The exact steps to be taken, or whether an all-encompassing sequence exists, is the subject of debate.
  - History of scientific method
  - Outline of scientific method
  - Timeline of the history of the scientific method

== Scientific knowledge ==
- Anomalies are abnormal or deviating phenomena that are inconsistent with previous data or cannot be precisely classified or explained.
- Classification is the use of categories to organize and describe individual subjects. This can be done descriptively to explain existing differences or prescriptively to create groups in a way that is useful.
- Consilience is the process in which distinct findings can produce novel conclusions when considered together.
- Data are sets of facts or information.
- Deductive reasoning is reasoning conducted purely through logic.
- Discoveries are the finding or explanation of new information.
- Inductive reasoning is the use of varied observations to make an inference.
- Explanation is the understanding of why a phenomenon occurs.
- Hypotheses are proposals of scientific fact that have yet to be definitively verified.
- Objectivity is the answering of scientific questions impartially without affecting the results with biases.
  - Confirmation bias is a cognitive bias that leads people to seek evidence that supports existing beliefs and interpret new evidence as supporting these beliefs.
- Reliability is the consistency in data as it is collected to demonstrate reproducibility.
- Scientific laws are descriptions of scientific fact that apply universally under all circumstances.
- Scientific theories are descriptions of scientific fact that are known to be true but cannot be proven to apply universally.
- Validity is the accurate correspondence and relevance of data to the real-world phenomena it is meant to measure. Valid data is derived from objective observation or experimentation.
- Verisimilitude is the degree to which a claim approaches the truth. The verisimilitude between two false ideas can be compared to determine which is less flawed.

== Branches of science ==
Science is divided into disciplines that explore different subject matter. Each discipline has its own considerations when being studied, and different methods are used between them. Scientists typically specialize in one discipline. Interdisciplinary sciences pull from multiple fields of study.

- Applied sciences are the uses of science for practical purposes.
  - Outline of applied science
  - Engineering (engineer) is the study and use of mechanical devices.
    - History of engineering
    - Outline of engineering
  - Medicine (physician) is the diagnosis and treatment of disease.
    - Bibliography of medicine
    - History of medicine
    - Outline of medicine
    - Timeline of medicine
  - Technology is the application of science to create products of practical and industrial value. It is sometimes recognized as a field of study distinct from science.
    - History of technology
    - Outline of technology
    - Timeline of technology
- Social sciences
  - Outline of social science
  - Anthropology (anthropologist) is the study of humans and human evolution.
    - Bibliography of anthropology
    - History of anthropology
    - Outline of anthropology
  - Economics (economist)
    - Bibliography of economics
    - History of economics
    - Outline of economics
  - Psychology (psychologist) is the study of the mind and human nature.
    - History of psychology
    - Outline of psychology
    - Timeline of psychology
  - Sociology (sociologist) is the study of society and its relation to the individual.
    - Bibliography of sociology
    - History of sociology
    - Outline of sociology
    - Timeline of sociology
- Formal sciences are fields of study in which precise conclusions can be reached without empirical study.
  - Outline of formal science
  - Logic (logician) is the study of pure reasoning.
    - History of logic
    - Outline of logic
  - Mathematics (mathematician) is the study of quantities and forms.
    - Bibliography of mathematics
    - History of mathematics
    - Outline of mathematics
    - Timeline of mathematics
  - Statistics (statistician) is the study of data and correlation.
    - Bibliography of statistics
    - History of statistics
    - Outline of statistics
- Natural sciences or physical sciences are the fields of study that engage with measurable natural phenomena.
  - Outline of natural science
  - Astronomy (astronomer) is the study of celestial bodies.
    - History of astronomy
    - Outline of astronomy
    - Timeline of astronomy
  - Biology (biologist) is the study of living things and their functions.
    - Bibliography of biology
    - History of biology
    - Outline of biology
    - Timeline of biology
  - Chemistry (chemist) is the study of matter and its properties.
    - Bibliography of chemistry
    - History of chemistry
    - Outline of chemistry
    - Timeline of chemistry
  - Earth science (Earth scientist)
    - Outline of Earth sciences
  - Physics (physicist) is the study of energy and physical mechanics.
    - Bibliography of physics
    - History of physics
    - Outline of physics

== History ==
=== Timeline ===
- Science in the ancient world
- Science in the middle ages
- Science in the Renaissance – The Renaissance allowed for expanded intellectual thought that influenced later scientific developments.
- The Scientific Revolution – A period of activity occurred c. 1550 – c. 1700 which developed the modern conception of what is now considered science. The scientific movement remained tied with Christianity, and most theories of the world blended empiricism and religion. It culminated in the studies of Isaac Newton and his 1687 treatise Principia. It also included the Copernican Revolution that was initiated by Nicolaus Copernicus and his argument for heliocentrism.
- Science in the Age of Enlightenment
- 19th century in science – Science first developed in the 19th century as its own subject that encompassed varying fields of inquiry. Biology and chemistry continued a period of growth that had begun in the late-18th century.
- 20th century in science – Physics became the dominant branch of science in the 20th century through the development of atomic technology. Logical empiricism was a major influence in the mid-20th century, but it lost favor by the 1970s. The science wars were a period of disagreement in the late-20th century about whether mainstream science should be held as an authoritative feature of society.
- 21st century in science

=== Historical disciplines ===
- Alchemy is the historical study of what is now associated with chemistry. It was accepted as a science until the end of the 17th century.
- Astrology is a method used in ancient and medieval times to study the social sciences through physical phenomena.
- Cosmogony is the study of Earth's origins through divine creation.
- Natural history is the historical name for study of subjects that are now associated with biology.
- Natural philosophy is the historical name for study of subjects that are now associated with physics and astronomy.

== Philosophy of science ==
Philosophy of science encompasses the questions, assumptions, foundations, methods and implications of science.

- Anti-realism is the opposition to scientific realism. Anti-realists believe that scientific theories cannot be objectively true or that they do not correlate to objectively real phenomena.
- Antiscience is a criticism and rejection of modern science and the scientific community.
- Denialism is the rejection of scientific facts that conflict with one's previous beliefs.
- Empiricism is the belief that truth is obtained from sense experience. Empiricists believe that science is a systematic and detailed application of common everyday thought and inquiry.
  - Constructive empiricism is the belief that scientific theories can be true but successful testing does not affirm their truth.
  - Logical positivism is an empiricist school of thought that was developed in Europe by the Vienna Circle in the 20th century.
  - Operationalism is an empiricist school of thought developed by Percy Williams Bridgman in 1927. It holds that all terms used in science must correspond to an observational test.
  - Verificationism is the empiricist belief that testability and verifiability must be possible for a claim to have meaning.
- Evidentialism is the belief that a claim should only be accepted if there is evidence supporting it.
- Fallibilism is the belief that no claim can ever be known with absolute certainty. The term was defined by Charles Sanders Peirce.
- Holism is the belief that individual scientific claims cannot be understood without also considering related claims, as it is only a network of claims that allows scientific prediction. This argument, the Duhem–Quine thesis, was developed by Willard Van Orman Quine as a response to logical positivism by adapting the philosophy of Pierre Duhem.
- Instrumentalism is the belief that science should be used as a guide predict phenomena without presenting it as a means of finding truth.
- Normal science is a system defined by Thomas Kuhn which described science in a given field as beginning with a paradigm shift that emerges from a new theory.
- Pragmatism is the belief that claims should be accepted based on value rather than evidence.
- Realism is the belief that true scientific theories can describe existing phenomena instead of merely hypothetical phenomena.
- Reductionism is the understanding of phenomena through fundamental causes and explanations.
- Relativism is the belief that knowledge cannot be understood objectively, but in relation to other forms of knowledge.
- Reliabilism is the belief that a fact is considered knowledge when it is derived from reliable methods.
- Science studies is the blending of perspectives and theories on scientific study to create a holistic understanding of science.
- Scientism is the belief that science should go beyond mere explanation and become the guiding force in society.
- Skepticism is the belief that unproven or widely-accepted beliefs should be questioned.

== Scientific community ==
The scientific community encompasses scientists, their interactions, and their influences on one another.

- Consensus is general agreement among scientists on a conclusion or finding.
- Demarcation is the division of scientific and non-scientific ideas, and the resulting dispute over how to divide them. Different fields of study may be evaluated on the level of experimental rigor, how much they engage in abstraction, how closely related they are with the humanities, or other qualities.
- Funding of science can come from governments and donors.
- Junk science is the presentation of uncertain scientific claims as facts, typically to a legal or political end.
  - List of topics characterized as pseudoscience
- Meta-analysis is the comparing of several studies on the same topic to draw conclusions.
- A paradigm is the overall understanding and accepted system of how science functions.
  - Paradigm shifts are historical periods of total change in how science is practiced. The concept was introduced by Thomas Kuhn.
- Peer review is a process in which an academic provides feedback on scientific writing, often anonymously, before publication.
- Pseudoscience is unscientific practice or belief that is presented as scientific or uses scientific language to suggest credibility.
  - History of pseudoscience
- Regulation of science involves the use of policy to limit scientific activity that regulators determine to be dangerous, unethical, or ineffective.
- Scientific controversy occurs when multiple schools of thought within a discipline contradict each other. This can include disputes about methods or theory.
- Scientific dissent occurs when a scientist disagrees with the scientific community over accepted practices or findings.
- Scientific misconduct is the publication of false, misleading, or plagiarized findings.
  - List of scientific misconduct incidents
  - Data fabrication is the use of fake data to present a conclusion.
  - HARKing (hypothesizing after results are known) is the practice of writing hypotheses to falsely claim that one had correctly predicted results before testing them.
  - P-hacking is the selective use or presentation of data to guarantee certain findings.
- Scientific papers describe data and findings and compare them to previous hypotheses.
  - Lists of publications in science
  - Abstracts are summaries of a paper's goals and findings that precede the full paper.
  - Citation analysis is the tracking of when scientific papers are cited by other papers.
  - Scientific journals are the primary venue for publishing scientific papers.
- Scientific priority is the recognition of a scientist's claim over a discovery.
- Scientific societies are organizations that emerged in Europe during the mid-17th century as an alternative to universities.
- Scientific writing is the recording and description of scientific knowledge or research, written in a way that it can be precisely explained to other members of the scientific community.
- Scientists are the practitioners of scientific study. The term scientist was coined by William Whewell in 1840.
- Sociology of science considers interactions, incentives, and norms within the scientific community. It was developed as an independent field in the mid-20th century by Robert K. Merton.
- Women in science and their role has changed over time. Women were historically excluded from scientific activity in most cases, but an increased role has developed with the rise of feminist movements.
  - Timeline of women in science

== Science in society ==
- Funding of science can come from both public and private sources, including governments and corporations.
- Politicization of science encompasses challenges to scientific activities, or regulations on their practice, for political purposes. This can be instigated by governments, advocacy groups, or the public.
  - List of books about the politics of science
- Religion and science are distinguished by science's dependence on known facts and its constraint to explain what can be demonstrated in nature, while religion depends on faith and can be interpreted more broadly.
  - Baháʼí and science
  - Buddhism and science
  - Christianity and science
  - Hinduism and science
  - Islam and science
- Science communication is the description of science to the general public. It involves the translation of precise technical terms to ones that are more generally understandable to those without background knowledge in a scientific field.
  - Popular science is a genre of writing on scientific subjects intended for consumption by the general public. It developed in the late-19th and early-20th centuries.
- Science fiction is a genre of speculative fiction in which scientific knowledge, ideas, and technology are central in its stories.
- Science journalism is the coverage of news about science and scientific developments.
- Science policy is the public policy governing how science can be conducted. It may be used to organize scientific activity to be more efficient, or to apply science for purposes like economic growth, social benefit, and military strength.
  - History of science policy
- Scientific literacy is the ability to understand science, particularly in the context of the general public.

== See also ==
- Lists of scientists
- Outline of academia
- Outline of academic disciplines
- Outline of history
- Scientific terminology
