= History of marine biology =

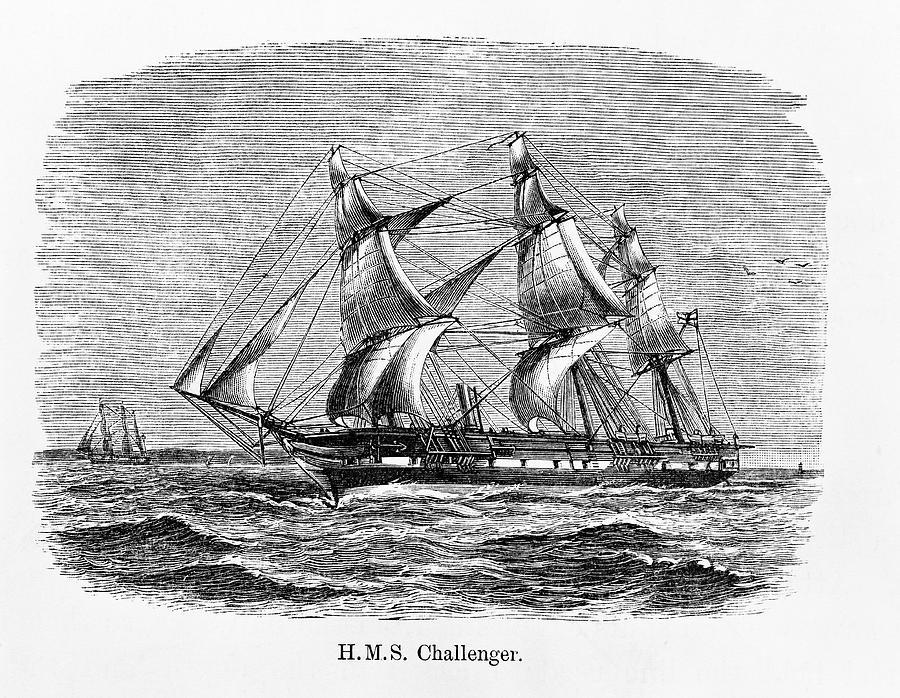
HMS Challenger during its pioneer expedition of 1872–76

Marine biology is a hybrid subject that combines aspects of organismal function, ecological interaction and the study of marine biodiversity. The earliest studies of marine biology trace back to the Phoenicians and the Greeks who are known as the initial explorers of the oceans and their composition. The first recorded observations on the distribution and habits of marine life were made by Aristotle (384–322 BC).Observations made in the earliest studies of marine biology provided an impetus for the age of discovery and exploration that followed. During this time, a vast amount of knowledge was gained about life that exists in the oceans. Individuals who contributed significantly to this pool of knowledge include Captain James Cook (1728–1779), Charles Darwin (1809–1882) and Wyville Thomson (1830–1882).

These individuals took part in some of the more well-known expeditions of all time, making foundational contributions to marine biology. The era was important for the history of marine biology, but naturalists were still constrained by available technologies that limited their ability to effectively locate and accurately examine species that inhabited the deep parts of the ocean.

The subsequent creation of marine laboratories was another important development because marine scientists now had places to conduct research and process their specimens from expeditions. Technological advances, such as sound ranging, scuba diving gear, submersibles and remotely operated vehicles, progressively made it easier to study the deep ocean. This allowed marine biologists to explore depths people once thought never existed.

== Early exploration of the deep sea ==
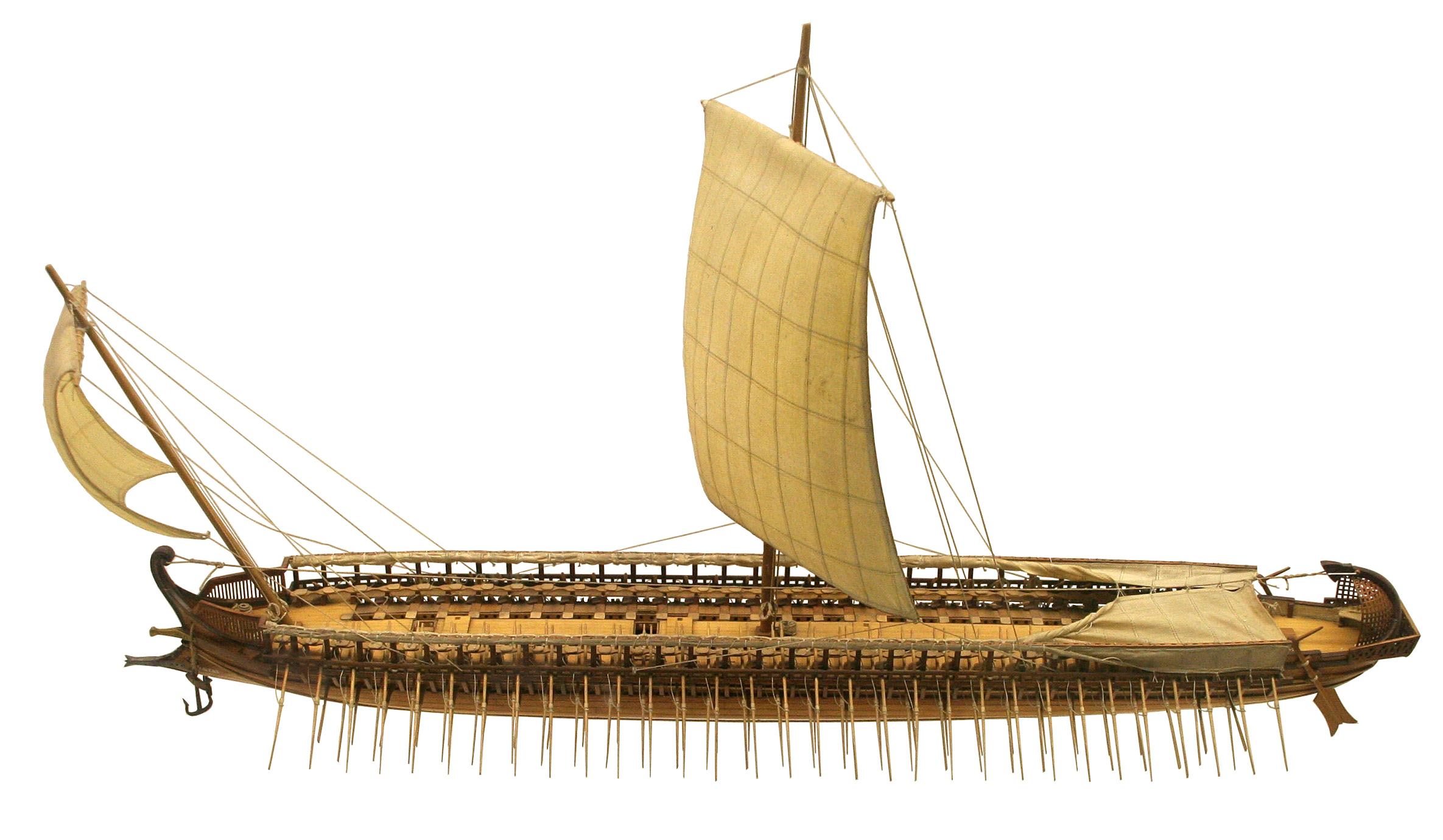
Model of a Greek boat

=== Phoenicians and Greeks ===
The history of marine biology can be traced as far back as 1200 BC when the Phoenicians and the Greeks began ocean voyages using celestial navigation. Phoenicians and Greeks were some of the first known explorers to leave their local communities bordering the Mediterranean Sea. They ventured outside the Mediterranean to the Atlantic Ocean with their knowledge of tides, currents and seasonal changes. It wasn't until much later at around 450 BC when observations of natural phenomena related to the oceans started getting recorded. Herodotus (484–425 BC) wrote of the regular tides in the Persian Gulf, the deposition of silt in the Nile Delta and used the term “Atlantic” to describe the western seas for the first time. It was during this time when many of the first observations about the composition of the oceans were recorded.

During the sixth century BC, the Greek philosopher Xenophanes (570-475 BC) recognised that some fossil shells were remains of shellfish. He used this to argue that what was at the time dry land was once under the sea. This was an important step in advancing from simply stating an idea to backing it with evidence and observation.

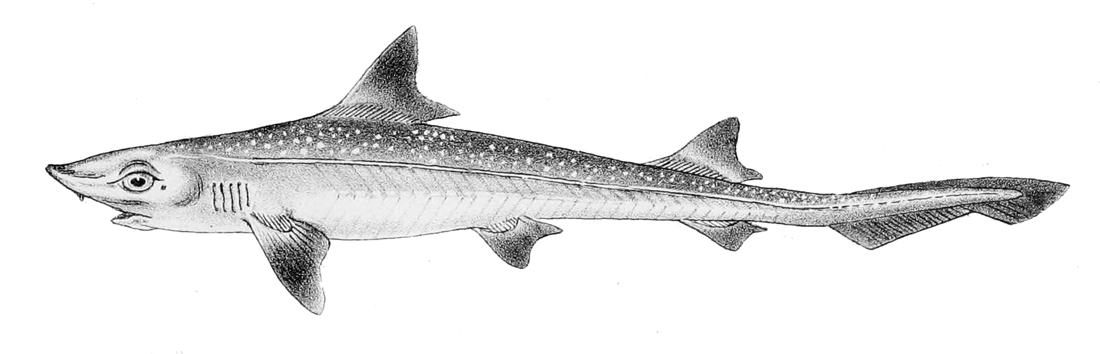
In the fourth century BC, Aristotle gave accurate descriptions of the embryological development of the hound shark Mustelus mustelus.

Later, during the fourth century BC, another Greek philosopher Aristotle (384–322 BC) initiated the tradition of natural philosophy and influenced the beginnings of marine biology with the early observations he made about marine life. Aristotle attempted a comprehensive classification of animals which included systematic descriptions of many marine species, and particularly species found in the Mediterranean Sea. These pioneering works include History of Animals, a general biology of animals, Parts of Animals, a comparative anatomy and physiology of animals, and Generation of Animals, on developmental biology. The most striking passages are about the sea-life visible from observation on Lesbos and available from the catches of fishermen. His observations on catfish, electric fish (Torpedo) and angler-fish are detailed, as is his writing on cephalopods, namely, Octopus, Sepia (cuttlefish) and the paper nautilus (Argonauta argo). His description of the hectocotyl arm, used in sexual reproduction, was widely disbelieved until its rediscovery in the 19th century. He separated aquatic mammals from fish, and knew that sharks and rays were part of a group he called Selachē (selachians). He gave accurate descriptions of the ovoviviparous embryological development of the hound shark Mustelus mustelus. His classification of living things contains elements which were still in use in the 19th century. What the modern zoologist would call vertebrates and invertebrates, Aristotle called "animals with blood" and "animals without blood" (he did not know that complex invertebrates do make use of hemoglobin, but of a different kind from vertebrates). He divided animals with blood into live-bearing (mammals), and egg-bearing (birds and fish). Invertebrates ("animals without blood") he divided into insects, crustacea (further divided into non-shelled – cephalopods – and shelled) and testacea (molluscs).

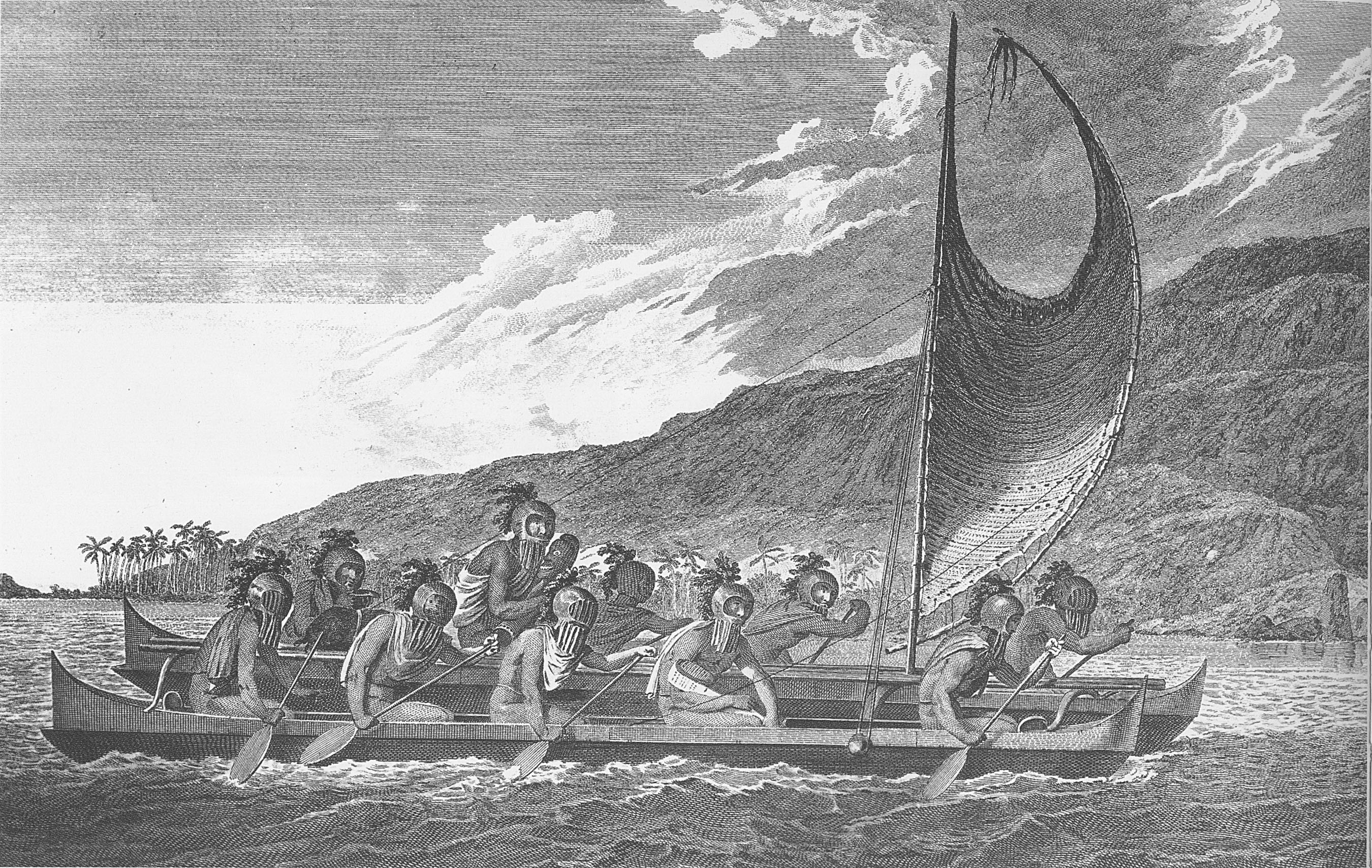
Hawaiian navigators sailing multi-hulled canoe

=== Polynesians ===
The Polynesians were also very involved in the exploration of marine life and their efforts are often overlooked. Throughout the time period of 300–1275 AD the Polynesians made efforts to explore and populate the great Polynesian triangle, which is bounded in the east by Easter Island, in the north by Hawaii and in the southwest by New Zealand. The Polynesians were among the first to go out and explore the mysteries of the ocean and marine life. In the years that followed the Polynesian efforts, there were minimal efforts that aimed to further man's understanding of the sea. This ended with the Age of Discovery in the late 15th century.

== Age of discovery ==
Between the late 15th century and early 20th century, humans explored the oceans like never before creating new maps and charts and collecting specimens to bring back to their home ports. Most of the exploration that took place during this time was fueled by European countries such as Spain, Portugal, France, Italy, Scotland and Germany. Some of the landmark explorers of marine biology carried out their famous work during this time period. Explorers such as Captain James Cook, Charles Darwin and Wyville Thomson made revolutionary contributions to the history of marine biology during this time of exploration.

=== James Cook ===
James Cook is well known for his voyages of exploration for the British Navy in which he mapped out a significant amount of the world's uncharted waters. Cook's explorations took him around the world twice and led to countless descriptions of previously unknown plants and animals. Cook's explorations influenced many others and led to a number of scientists examining marine life more closely. Among those influenced was Charles Darwin who went on to make many contributions of his own.

The voyage of the Beagle

=== Charles Darwin ===
Charles Darwin, best known for his theory of evolution, made many significant contributions to the early study of marine biology. He spent much of his time from 1831 to 1836 on the voyage of HMS Beagle collecting and studying specimens from a variety of marine organisms. It was also on this expedition where Darwin began to study coral reefs and their formation. He came up with the theory that the overall growth of corals is a balance between the growth of corals upward and the sinking of the sea floor. He then came up with the idea that wherever coral atolls would be found, the central island where the coral had started to grow would be gradually subsiding

=== Charles Wyville Thomson ===
Another influential expedition was the voyage of HMS Challenger from 1872 to 1876, organized and later led by Charles Wyville Thomson. It was the first expedition purely devoted to marine science. The expedition collected and analyzed thousands of marine specimens, laying the foundation for present knowledge about life near the deep-sea floor. The findings from the expedition were a summary of the known natural, physical and chemical ocean science to that time.

=== Later exploration ===
This era of marine exploration came to a close with the first and second round-the-world voyages of the Danish Galathea expeditions and Atlantic voyages by the USS Albatross, the first research vessel purpose built for marine research. These voyages further cleared the way for modern marine biology by building a base of knowledge about marine biology. This was followed by the progressive development of more advanced technologies which began to allow more extensive explorations of ocean depths that were once thought too deep to sustain life.

== Modern studies ==
=== Marine biology labs ===
In the 1960s and 1970s, ecological research into the life of the ocean was undertaken at institutions set up specifically to study marine biology. Notable was the Woods Hole Oceanographic Institution in America, which established a model for other marine laboratories subsequently set up around the world. Their findings of unexpectedly high species diversity in places thought to be inhabitable stimulated much theorizing by population ecologists on how high diversification could be maintained in such a food-poor and seemingly hostile environment.

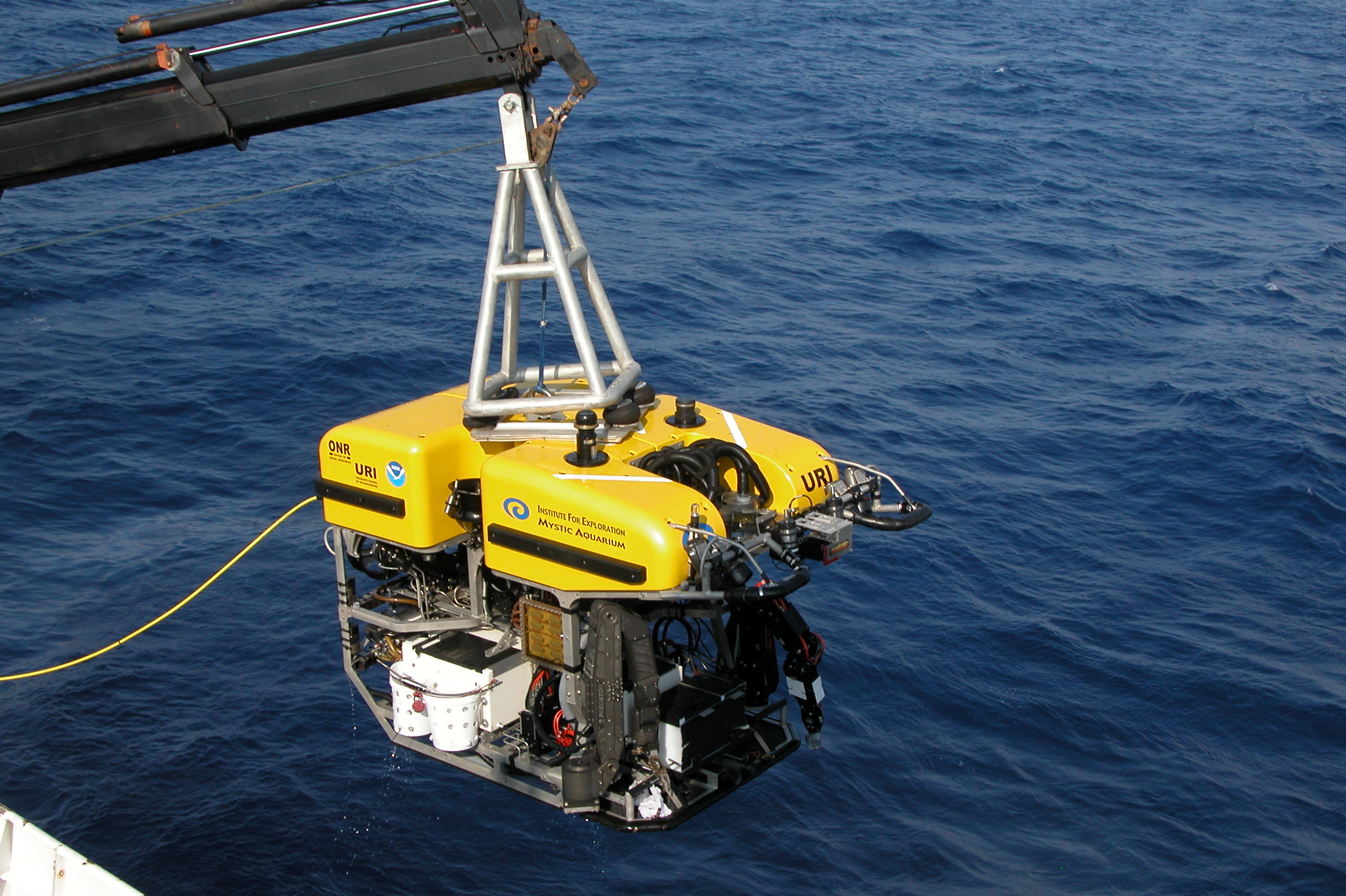
A science ROV being retrieved by an oceanographic research vessel.

=== Exploration technology ===
In the past, the study of marine biology has been limited by a lack of technology as researchers could only go so deep to examine life in the ocean. Before the mid-twentieth century, the deep-sea bottom could not be seen unless one dredged a piece of it and brought it to the surface. This has changed dramatically due to the development of new technologies in both the laboratory and the open sea. These new technological developments have allowed scientists to explore parts of the ocean previously unknown to science.

The development of scuba gear allowed researchers to visually explore the oceans as it contains a self-contained underwater breathing apparatus allowing a person to breathe while being submerged 100 to 200 feet into the ocean. Submersibles were built like small submarines with the purpose of taking marine scientists to deeper depths of the ocean while protecting them from increasing atmospheric pressures that cause complications deep under water. The first models could hold several individuals and allowed limited visibility but enabled marine biologists to see and photograph the deeper portions of the oceans. Remotely operated underwater vehicles are now used with and without submersibles to see the deepest areas of the ocean that would be too dangerous for humans. ROVs are fully equipped with cameras and sampling equipment which allows researchers to see and control everything the vehicle does. ROVs have become the dominant type of technology used to view the deepest parts of the ocean.

=== Romanticization ===
In the late 20th century and into the 21st, marine biology was "glorified and romanticized through films and television shows," leading to an influx in interested students who required a damping on their enthusiasm with the day-to-day realities of the field.

== See also ==
- Research vessel
