= History of geophysics =

The historical development of geophysics has been motivated by two factors. One of these is the research curiosity of humankind related to planet Earth and its several components, its events and its problems. The second is economical usage of Earth's resources (ore deposits, petroleum, water resources, etc.) and Earth-related hazards such as earthquakes, volcanoes, tsunamis, tides, and floods.

== Classical and observational period ==
In circa 240 BC, Eratosthenes of Cyrene measured the circumference of Earth using geometry and the angle of the Sun at more than one latitude in Egypt.

There is some information about earthquakes in Aristotle's Meteorology, in Naturalis Historia by Pliny the Elder, and in Strabo's Geographica. Aristotle and Strabo recorded observations on tides.

A natural explanation of volcanoes was first undertaken by the Greek philosopher Empedocles (c. 490-430 B.C.), who considered the world to be divided into four elemental forces: earth, air, fire and water. He maintained that volcanoes were manifestation of elemental fire. Winds and earthquakes would play a key role in explanations of volcanoes. Lucretius claimed Mount Etna was completely hollow and the fires of the underground driven by a fierce wind circulating near sea level. Pliny the Elder noted that the presence of earthquakes preceded an eruption. Athanasius Kircher (1602–1680) witnessed eruptions of Mount Etna and Stromboli, then visited the crater of Vesuvius and published his view of an Earth with a central fire connected to numerous others caused by the burning of sulfur, bitumen and coal.

== Instrumental and analytical period ==
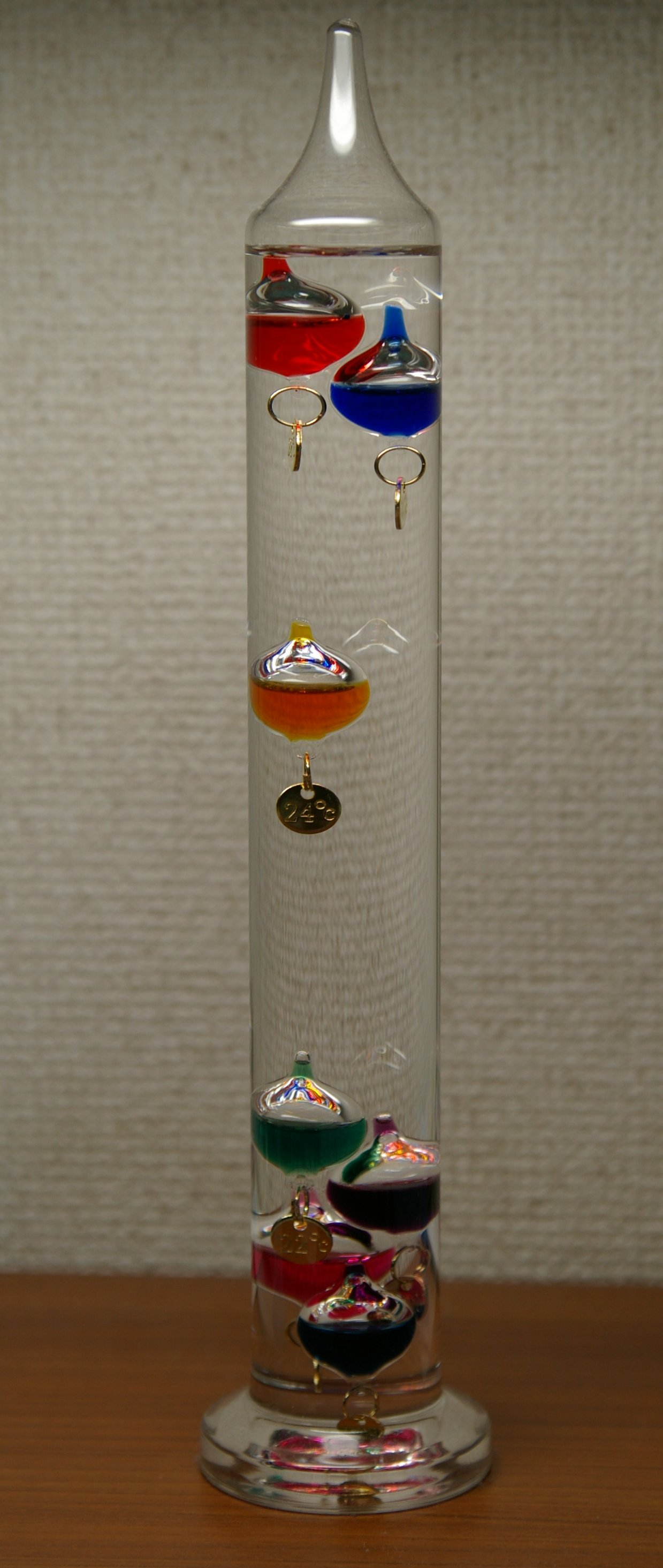
A Galilean thermometer

Arguably the first modern experimental treatise was William Gilbert's De Magnete (1600), in which he deduced that compasses point north because the Earth itself is magnetic. In 1687 Isaac Newton published his Principia, which not only laid the foundations for classical mechanics and gravitation but also explained a variety of geophysical phenomena such as tides and the precession of the equinox.

These experimental and mathematical analyses were applied to several areas of geophysics: Earth's shape, density, and gravity field (Pierre Bouguer, Alexis Clairaut and Henry Cavendish), Earth's magnetic field (Alexander von Humboldt, Edmund Halley and Carl Friedrich Gauss), seismology (John Milne and Robert Mallet), and the Earth's age, heat and radioactivity (Arthur Holmes and William Thomson, 1st Baron Kelvin).

There are several descriptions and discussions about a philosophical theory of the water cycle by Marcus Vitruvius, Leonardo da Vinci and Bernard Palissy. Pioneers in hydrology include Pierre Perrault, Edme Mariotte and Edmund Halley in studies of such things as rainfall, runoff, drainage area, velocity, river cross-section measurements and discharge. Advances in the 18th century included Daniel Bernoulli's piezometer and Bernoulli's equation as well as the Pitot tube by Henri Pitot. In the 19th century, groundwater hydrology was furthered by Darcy's law, the Dupuit-Thiem well formula, and the Hagen-Poiseuille equation for flows through pipes. Physical Geography of the Sea, the first textbook of oceanography, was written by Matthew Fontaine Maury in 1855.

The thermoscope, or Galileo thermometer, was constructed by Galileo Galilei in 1607. In 1643, Evangelista Torricelli invented the mercury barometer. Blaise Pascal (in 1648) rediscovered that atmospheric pressure decreases with height, and deduced that there is a vacuum above the atmosphere.

== Emergence as a discipline ==
The first known use of the word geophysics was by Julius Fröbel in 1834 (in German). It was used occasionally in the next few decades, but did not catch on until journals devoted to the subject began to appear, beginning with Beiträge zur Geophysik in 1887. The future Journal of Geophysical Research was founded in 1896 with the title Terrestrial Magnetism. In 1898, a Geophysical Institute was founded at the University of Göttingen, and Emil Wiechert became the world's first Chair of Geophysics. An international framework for geophysics was provided by the founding of the International Union of Geodesy and Geophysics in 1919.

== 20th century ==
The 20th century was a revolutionary age for geophysics. As an international scientific effort between 1957 and 1958, the International Geophysical Year or IGY was one of the most important for scientific activity of all disciplines of geophysics: aurora and airglow, cosmic rays, geomagnetism, gravity, ionospheric physics, longitude and latitude determinations (precision mapping), meteorology, oceanography, seismology and solar activity.

=== Earth's interior and seismology ===
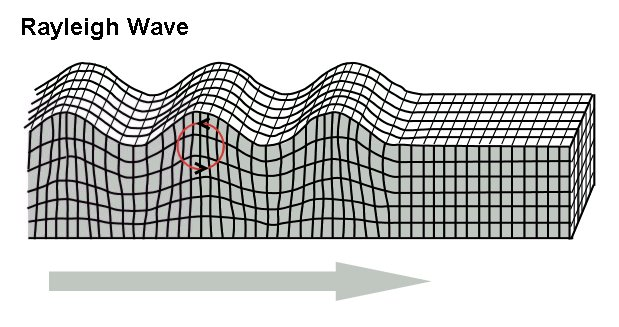
Rayleigh wave

Determining the physics of Earth's interior was enabled by the development of the first seismographs in the 1880s. Based on the behavior of the waves reflected off the internal layers of the Earth, several theories developed as to what would cause variances in wave speed or loss of certain frequencies. This led to scientists like Inge Lehmann discovering the presence of the Earth's core in 1936. Beno Gutenberg and Harold Jeffreys worked at explaining the difference in Earth's density due to compression and the shear velocity of waves. Since seismology is based on elastic waves, the speed of waves could help determine density and therefore the behavior of the layers within the Earth.

Nomenclature for the behavior of seismic waves was produced based on these findings. P-waves and S-waves were used to describe two types of elastic body waves possible. Love waves and Rayleigh waves were used to describe two types of surface waves possible.

Scientists who have contributed to advances in knowledge about the Earth's interior and seismology include Emil Wiechert, Beno Gutenberg, Andrija Mohorovičić, Harold Jeffreys, Inge Lehmann, Edward Bullard, Charles Francis Richter, Francis Birch, Frank Press, Hiroo Kanamori and Walter Elsasser.

One highly debated topic about Earth's interior is mantle plumes. These are theorized to be rising magma, which is responsible for the hotspots in the world, like Hawaii. Originally the theory was that mantle plumes rose up in a direct path, but now there is evidence that the plumes may deflect by small degrees as they rise. It was also found that the proposed hotspot underneath Yellowstone may not be related to a rising mantle plume. This theory has not been fully researched.

=== Plate tectonics ===
In the second half of the 20th century, plate tectonics theory was developed by several contributors including Alfred Wegener, Maurice Ewing, Robert S. Dietz, Harry Hammond Hess, Hugo Benioff, Walter C. Pitman, III, Frederick Vine, Drummond Matthews, Keith Runcorn, Bryan Isacks, Edward Bullard, Xavier Le Pichon, Dan McKenzie, W. Jason Morgan and John Tuzo Wilson. Prior to this, people had ideas of continental drift, but no real evidence came until the late 20th century. Alexander von Humboldt observed in the early 19th century the geometry and geology of the shores of continents of the Atlantic Ocean. James Hutton and Charles Lyell brought about the idea of gradual change, uniformitarianism, which helped people cope with the slow drift of the continents. Alfred Wegener spearheaded the original theory of continental drift and spent much of his life devoted to this theory. He proposed "Pangaea", one unified giant continent.

During the development of continental drift theory, there was not much exploration of the oceanic part of the world, only continental. Once people began to pay attention to the ocean, geologists found that the floor was spreading, and in different rates at different spots. There are three different main ways in which plates can move: transform, divergent, and Convergent. As well, there can be Rifts, areas where the land is beginning to spread apart.

=== Oceanography ===
Advances in physical oceanography occurred in the 20th century. Sea depth by acoustic measurements was first made in 1914. The German "Meteor" expedition gathered 70,000 ocean depth measurements using an echo sounder, surveying the Mid-Atlantic Ridge between 1925 and 1927. The HMS "Challenger" expedition led by Thomas Gaskell identified the record-setting Challenger Deep in 1951. The Great Global Rift was discovered by Maurice Ewing and Bruce Heezen in 1953, and the mountain range under the Arctic was found in 1954 by the Arctic Institute of the USSR. The theory of seafloor spreading was developed in 1960 by Harry Hammond Hess. The Ocean Drilling Program started in 1966. There has been much emphasis on the application of large scale computers to oceanography to allow numerical predictions of ocean conditions and as a part of overall environmental change prediction.

=== Geomagnetism ===
Geomagnetic polarity, late Cenozoic

The motion of the conductive molten metal beneath the Earth's crust, or the Earth's dynamo, is responsible for the existence of the magnetic field. The interaction of the magnetic field and solar radiation has an impact on how much radiation reaches the surface of Earth and the integrity of the atmosphere. It has been found that the magnetic poles of the Earth have reversed several times, allowing researchers to get an idea of the surface conditions of the planet at that time. The cause of the magnetic poles being reversed is unknown, and the intervals of change vary and do not show a consistent interval. It is believed that the reversal is correlated to the Earth's mantle, although exactly how is still debated.

Distortions to the Earth's magnetic field cause the phenomenon Aurora Borealis, commonly called the Northern Lights. The magnetic field stores energy given by cosmic particles known as solar wind, which causes the magnetic field lines to expand. When the lines contract, they release this energy, which can be seen as the Northern Lights.

=== Atmospheric influences ===
The Earth's climate changes over time due to the planet's atmospheric composition, the sun's luminosity, and the occurrence of catastrophic events.

Atmospheric composition affects and is affected by the biological mechanisms active on the Earth's surface. Organisms effect the amount of oxygen vs. carbon dioxide through respiration and photosynthesis. They also affect the levels of nitrogen through fixation, nitrification, and denitrification. The ocean is capable of absorbing carbon dioxide from the atmosphere, but this varies based on the levels of nitrogen and phosphorus present in the water. Humans have also played a role in changing the atmospheric composition of the Earth through industrial byproducts, deforestation, and motor vehicles.

The luminosity of the Sun increases as it progresses through its life cycle and are visible over the course of millions of years. Sunspots can form on the Sun's surface, which can cause greater variability in the emissions that Earth receives.

Volcanoes form when two plates meet and one subducts underneath the other. They thus form along most plate boundaries; the Ring of Fire is an example of this. The study of volcanoes along plate boundaries has shown a correlation between eruptions and climate. Alan Robock theorizes that volcanic activity can influence climate and can lead to global cooling for years. The leading idea, based on volcanic eruptions, is that sulfur dioxide released from volcanoes has a major effect on the cooling of the atmosphere following the eruption.

Impacts from large celestial bodies, commonly asteroids, create shock waves that push air and distribute dust into the atmosphere, blocking sunlight. This causes global cooling, which can lead to the death and possible extinction of many species.

=== Industrial application ===
Industrial applications of geophysics were developed by demand of petroleum exploration and recovery in the 1920s. Later, petroleum, mining and groundwater geophysics were improved. Earthquake hazard minimization and soil/site investigations for earthquake-prone areas were new applications of geophysical engineering in the 1990s.

Seismology is used in the mining industry to read and build models of events that may have been caused or contributed to by the process of mining. This allows scientists to predict the hazards associated with mining in the area.

Much like mining, seismic waves are used to create models of the Earth's subsurface. Geological features, called traps, that commonly indicate the presence of oil, can be identified from the model and used to determine suitable sites to drill.

Groundwater is highly vulnerable to the pollution produced from industry and waste disposal. In order to preserve the quality of fresh water sources, maps of groundwater depth are created and compared to the locations of pollutant sources.

== See also ==
- History of geology
- History of geomagnetism
- Timeline of the development of tectonophysics
