= List of botany journals =

The following is a list of notable botanical scientific journals.

== General botany ==
The following table is a list of scientific journals publishing articles on many areas of botany.

Journal	Publisher	Publication History	Language	Publication Frequency
Acta Societatis Botanicorum Poloniae	Polish Botanical Society	1923–present	English	4 issues per year
Aliso	Rancho Santa Ana Botanic Garden	1948–present	English	2 issues per year
American Journal of Botany	HighWire Press and the Botanical Society of America	1914–present	English	12 issues per year
Anales del Jardín Botánico de Madrid	Real Jardín Botánico de Madrid	1941–present	Spanish and English	2 issues per year
Annals of Botany	Oxford Journals	1887–present	English	12 issues per year
Annals of the Missouri Botanical Garden	Missouri Botanical Garden Press	1914–present	English	4 issues per year
Annual Review of Plant Biology	Annual Reviews	1950–present	English	1 issue per year
AoB Plants	Oxford Journals	2009–present	English	Continuous, Online
Aquatic Botany	Elsevier	1975–present	English	6 issues per year
Arnoldia	Harvard University	1911–present	English	4 issues per year
Australian Journal of Botany	CSIRO	1953–present	English	8 issues per year
Australian Systematic Botany	CSIRO	1988–present	English	6 issues per year
Biologia Plantarum	Czech Academy of Sciences	1959–present	English	4 issues per year
Blumea	ingentaconnect and National Herbarium of the Netherlands	1934–present	English	3 issues per year
Blyttia	Norwegian Botanical Association	1943–present	Norwegian	4 issues per year
Botanical Journal of the Linnean Society	Wiley Online Library	1856–present	English	12 issues per year
Botanisk Tidsskrift	Danish Botanical Society	1866–1980	Danish, German, English, and French	4 issues per year
Botany	National Research Council Canada	1929–present	English	12 issues per year
Brittonia	New York Botanical Garden Press	1931–present	English	4 issues per year
The Bryologist	American Bryological and Lichenological Society	1898–present	English	4 issues per year
Caldasia	National University of Colombia	1940–present	Spanish and English	2 issues per year
Castanea	Southern Appalachian Botanical Society	1936–present	English	2 issues per year
Curtis's Botanical Magazine	Wiley and Royal Botanic Gardens, Kew	1787–present	English	4 issues per year
Dansk Botanisk Arkiv	Danish Botanical Society	1913–1980	Danish, English, French, and German	Variable
Edinburgh Journal of Botany	Cambridge University Press for the Royal Botanic Garden Edinburgh	1954–present	English	3 issues per year
Evansia	American Bryological and Lichenological Society	1984–present	English	4 issues per year
Frontiers in Plant Science	Frontiers Media	2010–present	English	Continuous, Online
Harvard Papers in Botany	Harvard University Herbaria	1989–present	English	2 issues per year
International Journal of Plant Sciences	University of Chicago Press	1875–present	English	9 issues per year
Journal of Experimental Botany	Oxford Journals for the Society for Experimental Biology	1950–present	English	12 issues per year
Journal of Plant Physiology	Elsevier	1909–present	English	Continuous, Online
Journal of the Torrey Botanical Society	Torrey Botanical Society	1973–present	English	4 issues per year
Kew Bulletin	Springer Science+Business Media and Royal Botanic Gardens, Kew	1887–present	English	4 issues per year
New Journal of Botany	Taylor & Francis and Botanical Society of Britain and Ireland	1949–2017	English	3 issues per year
New Phytologist	Wiley-Blackwell and the New Phytologist Trust	1902–present	English	16 issues per year
New Zealand Journal of Botany	Royal Society of New Zealand	1963–present	English	4 issues per year
Nordic Journal of Botany	Wiley and Nordic Society Oikos	1981–present	English	6 issues per year
Nuytsia	Western Australian Herbarium	1970–present	English	3 issues per year
Pakistan Journal of Botany	Pakistan Botanical Society	1969–present	English	6 issues per year
PhytoKeys	Pensoft Publishers	2010–present	English	Continuous, Online
Phytotaxa	Magnolia Press	2009–present	English	Continuous, Online
Phytochemistry	Elsevier	1961–present	English	12 issues per year
Plant Biology	Wiley, German Society for Plant Sciences and Royal Botanical Society of the Netherlands	1999–present	English	6 issues per year
Plant Ecology & Diversity	Taylor & Francis for Botanical Society of Scotland	2008–present	English	4 issues per year
The Plant Cell	American Society of Plant Biologists and Oxford University Press	1989–present	English	4 issues per year
The Plant Journal	Wiley-Blackwell and the Society for Experimental Biology	1991–present	English	24 issues per year
Plant Physiology	American Society of Plant Biologists	1926–present	English	12 issues per year
Plant Science	Elsevier	1973–present	English	12 issues per year
Planta	Springer Science+Business Media	1973–present	English	12 issues per year
Portugaliae Acta Biologica	University of Lisbon	1945–present	English and Portuguese	1 volume per year
Preslia	Czech Botanical Society	1914–present	English	4 issues per year
Rhodora	New England Botanical Society	1899–present	English	4 issues per year
Svensk Botanisk Tidskrift	Swedish Botanical Society	1907–present	Swedish	5 issues per year
Systematic Botany	American Society of Plant Taxonomists	1976–present	English	4 issues per year
Taxon	International Association for Plant Taxonomy	1951–present	English	6 issues per year
Telopea	National Herbarium of New South Wales, Royal Botanic Gardens & Domain Trust	1975–present	English	1 issue per year
Willdenowia	Botanic Garden and Botanical Museum Berlin	1895–present	English	3 issues per year

== Agronomy and horticulture ==
The following table is a list of botany journals specialising in agronomy, including crop science and horticulture.

Journal	Publisher	Publication History	Language	Publication Frequency
Advances in Agronomy	Academic Press	1949–present	English	6 volumes per year
Agronomie	INRA and EDP Sciences	1981–2004	English and French	6 issues per year
Agronomy for Sustainable Development	INRA and EDP Sciences	2005–present	English	4 issues per year
Ceiba	Escuela Agricola Panamericana	1950–present	English	?
Crop Science	Crop Science Society of America	1961–present	English	6 issues per year
Davidsonia	UBC Botanical Garden	1970–present	English	4 issues per year
Economic Botany	Society for Economic Botany	1946–present	English	4 issues per year
Hilgardia	University of California, Berkeley	1925–1996	English	9 issues per year
Journal of Applied Horticulture	Society for the Advancement of Horticulture	1999–present	English	3 issues per year
Plant and Soil	Springer Science+Business Media and the Royal Netherlands Society of Agricultural Science	1948–present	English	12 volumes per year

== Dendrology ==
the following table is a list of journals that specialize in publishing articles on dendrology.

Journal	Publisher	Publication History	Language	Publication Frequency
Canadian Journal of Forest Research	National Research Council Canada	1971–present	English	12 issues per year

== Plant pathology ==
The following table is a list of botany journals specializing in plant pathology.

Journal	Publisher	Publication History	Language	Publication Frequency
Annual Review of Phytopathology	Annual Reviews	1963–present	English	Once a year
Australasian Plant Pathology	CSIRO	1972–present	English	6 issues per year
Crop Protection	Elsevier	1982–present	English	12 issues per year
Molecular Plant Pathology	Wiley-Blackwell and the British Society for Plant Pathology	2000–present	English	6 issues per year
Phytopathologia Mediterranea	Firenze University Press and Mediterranean Phytopathological Union	1967–present	English	3 issues per year
Phytopathology	American Phytopathological Society	1910–present	English	12 issues per year
Plant Pathology	Wiley-Blackwell and the British Society for Plant Pathology	1952–present	English	6 issues per year

== Review journals ==
The following table is a list of botany journals that contain collections of review papers about general plant science.

Journal	Publisher	Publication History	Language	Publication Frequency
Annual Review of Plant Biology	Annual Reviews	1950–present	English	1 volume per year
Critical Reviews in Plant Sciences	Taylor & Francis	1983–present	English	6 issues per year
Current Opinion in Plant Biology	Elsevier	1998–present	English	6 issues per year
Trends in Plant Science	Cell Press	1996–present	English	12 issues per year
