= Pakistan Journal =

Pakistan Journal may refer to:

- Pakistan Journal of Botany
- Pakistan Journal of Life and Social Sciences
- Pakistan Journal of Meteorology
- Pakistan Journal of Pharmaceutical Sciences
