= Mustafa Shameel =

Pakistani biologist (1941–2013)

Dr Mustafa Shameel
- مصطفی شمیل
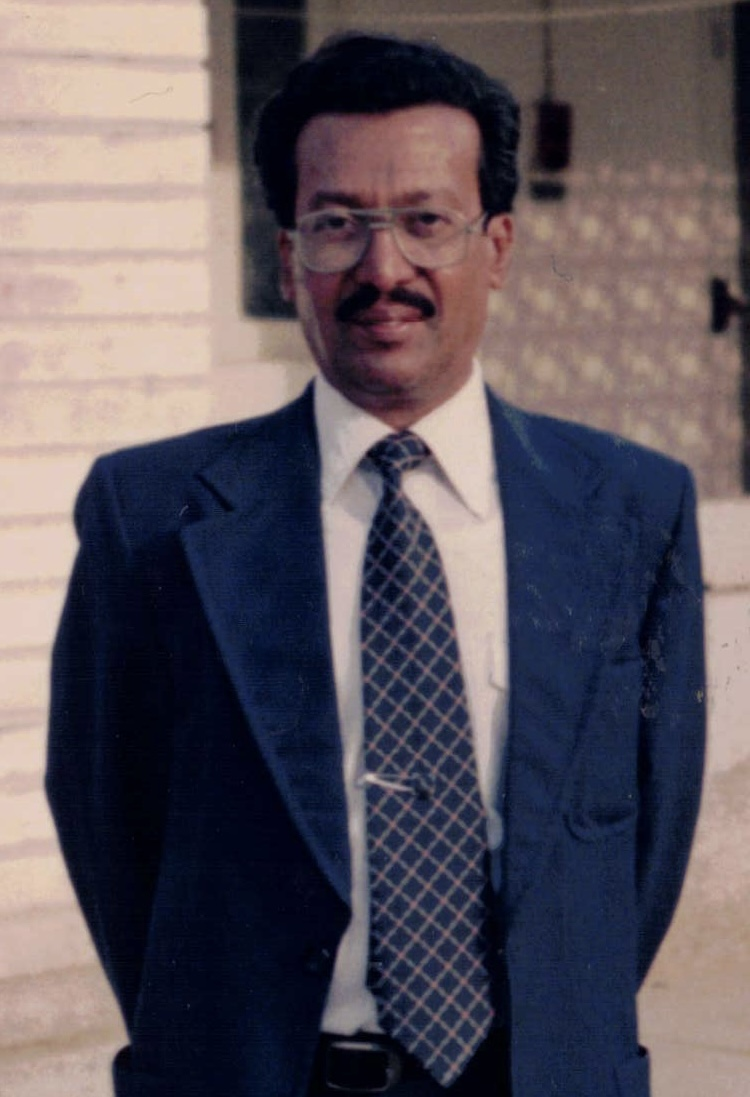
- Shameel in 1992
- Born: July 3, 1941; Rudauli, Uttar Pradesh, British India
- Died: May 13, 2013 (aged 71); Karachi, Pakistan
- Education: University of Karachi, University of Kiel
- Scientific career
- Fields: Phycology
- Workplaces: University of Karachi, University of Kiel
- Doctoral advisor: Fritz Gessner

Mustafa Shameel (Urdu: مصطفی شمیل; July 3, 1941 – May 13, 2013) was a Pakistani scientist and educator noted for his work in the fields of barobiology, phycochemistry and taxonomy of algae. He spent most of his five decades' academic career at the University of Karachi.

== Early life and education ==
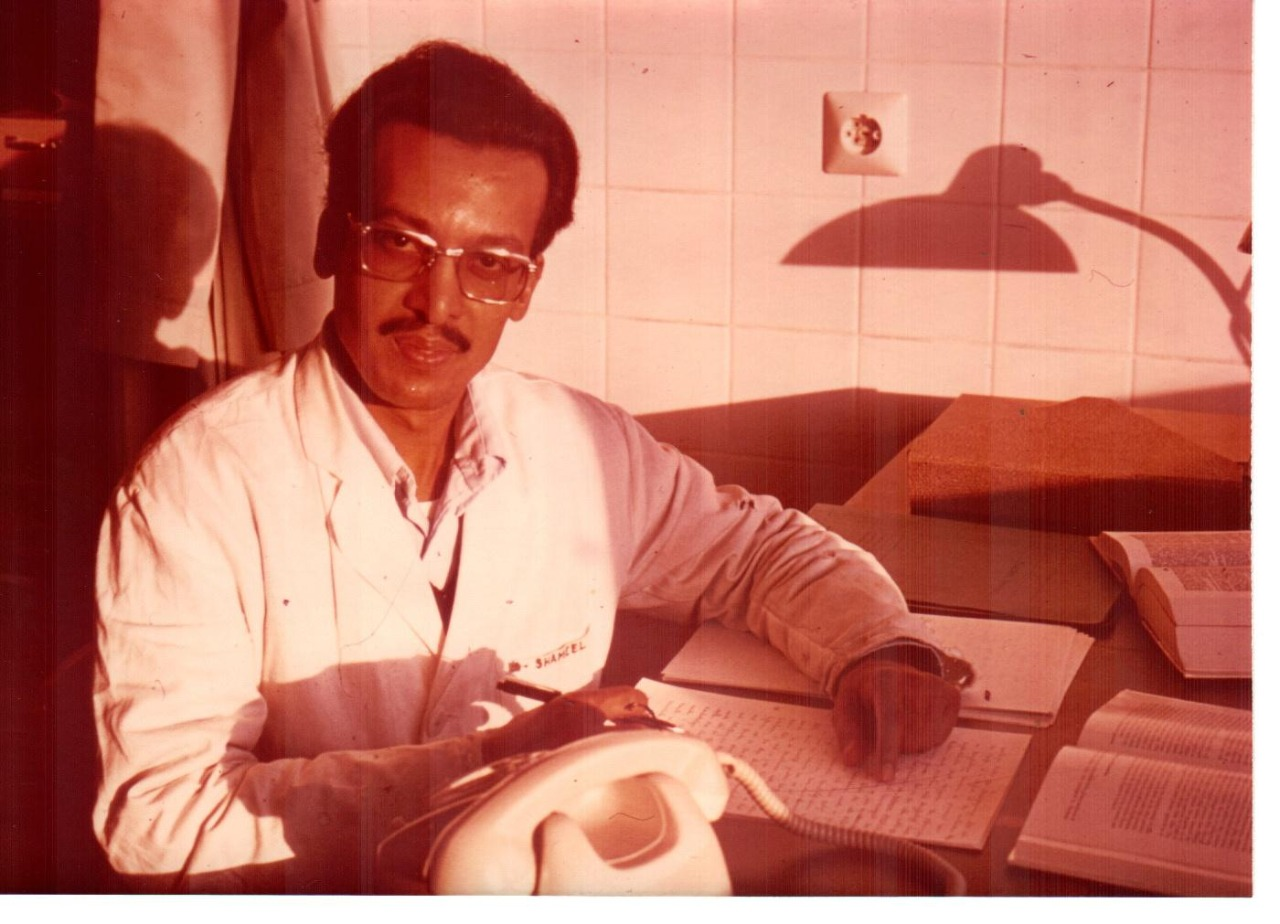
Mustafa Shameel in his lab at Christian Albert Universität in Kiel, Germany during his PhD in 1970

Mustafa Shameel was born on 3 July 1941, as Syed Mustafa Shameel Quadri, to a family of Syed Amirul Hassan Quadri and Mohammadi Begum in Rudauli, Uttar Pradesh, British India. He earned his MSc degree in botany from the University of Karachi in 1962; In 1965 Mustafa Shameel also earned his MSc degree in homoeopathy from the International Medical College Lahore, but he did not practice it; and Dr. rer. nat. in marine botany from the University of Kiel in 1972 under DAAD Scholarship in Bonn, Germany. In 1977 he completed postdoctoral research from the same university under Alexander von Humboldt Fellowship.

== Career ==
Mustafa Shameel started his academic career as a lecturer at the department of botany, University of Karachi, in 1962. In 1972, upon receiving his PhD from Kiel University, he progressed to assistant professor, to associate professor in 1978, professor in 1985, meritorious professor in 1999, and eminent professor (HEC) in 2003.

From December 1977 to July 1978 he worked as Assistant Professor of the Department of Botany at El-Fateh University in Tripoli, Libya.

From 1994 to 1998 he served as a director of the Institute of Marine Science, and from 1999 to 2001 as a director of the Centre of Excellence in Marine Biology at the University of Karachi. Also, from 1994 to 2008 he worked as Honorary Professor of the Department of Botany, Federal Urdu University of Arts, Science & Technology, Karachi, Pakistan.

In 2001-2003 Shameel was the President of Pakistan Botanical Society. In 2005 he was elected a Fellow of Pakistan Academy of Sciences, and a Fellow of The Academy of Sciences for the Developing World, Trieste, Italy, in 2008.

== Scientific contributions ==
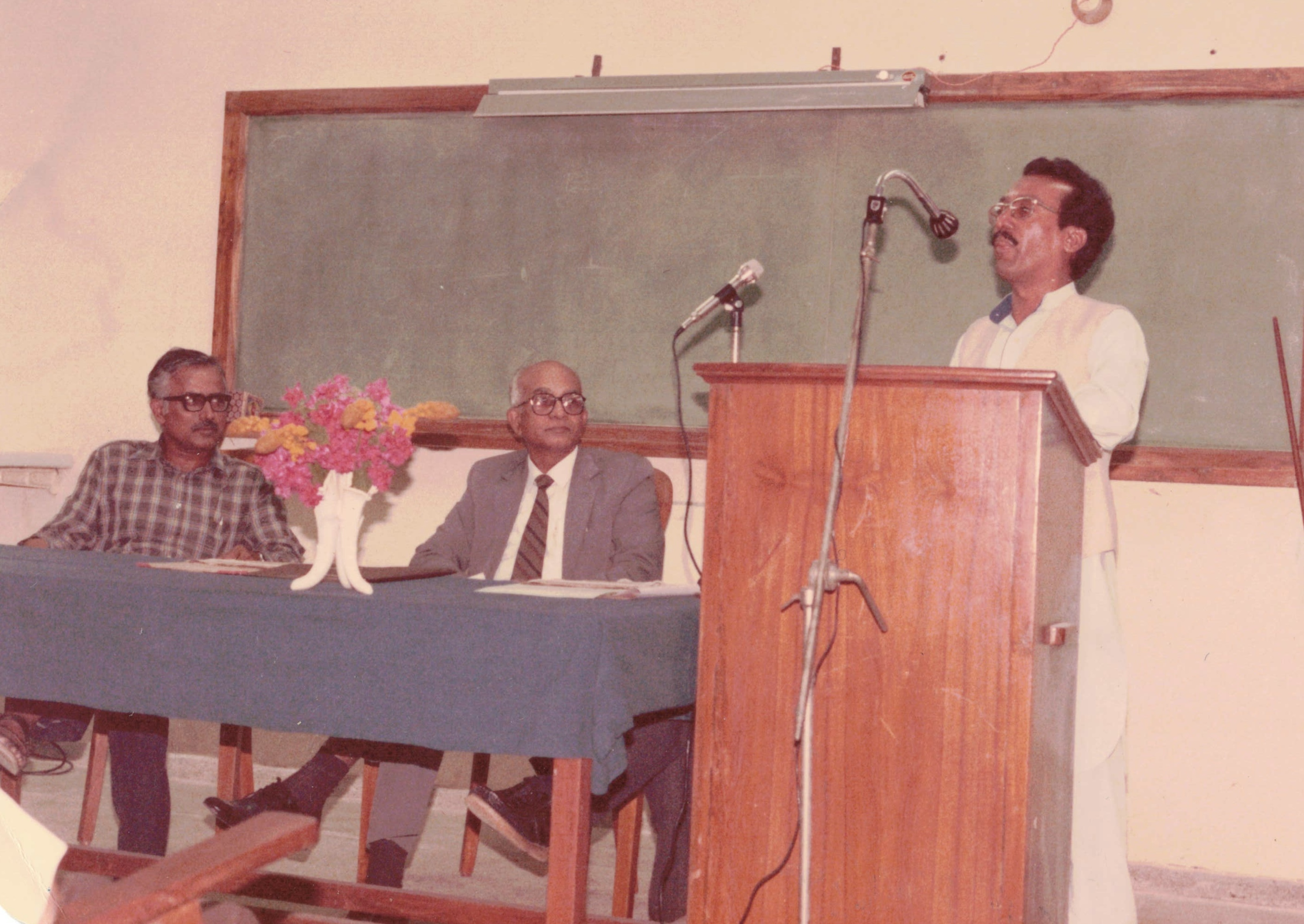
International Workshop on Phycology, Madras, India in 1986

In his early publications, Mustafa Shameel pioneered the research on barobiology of seaweeds, the effects of high hydrostatic pressure on the marine algae.

In 1990 he developed a new concept of phycochemistry, the study of natural products and chemical constituents occurring within algal thallus. In 2005 he founded “International Journal of Phycology and Phycochemistry”.

Mustafa Shameel described 28 new taxa of marine algae; extracted and described 24 new chemical compounds such as sterols, terpenes, and glycosides from the seaweeds.

In 2001, in his work “An approach to the classification of algae in the new millennium” Shameel proposed a new classification of algae by creating 22 new taxonomic groups. He later developed and modified it in 2008 and 2012. Shameelian classification of algae is now used in all the major universities of Pakistan.

Seven new species of algae were named after him (Ulothrix shameelii, Scinaia shameelii, Stypopodium shameelii, Codium shameelii, Ceratium shameelii, Spatoglossum shameelii, and Balliella shameelii).

Shameel served on editorial boards of Pakistan Journal of Botany, Pakistan Journal of Marine Sciences, Marine Research journal, Biological Research Journal, Journal of Natural History & Wildlife, and FUUAST Journal of Biology. He also served as editor-in-chief of Pakistan Journal of Marine Biology in 1999–2001, and of International Journal of Phycology & Phycochemistry in 2005–2010.

== Awards and recognition ==
In recognition of his work, Prof Shameel was awarded the Presidential Awards Izaz-I-Fazeelat in 2000 and Tamgha-e-Imtiaz in 2001.

Every year since 2014 his students organize a workshop and a seminar in his name at the University of Karachi.

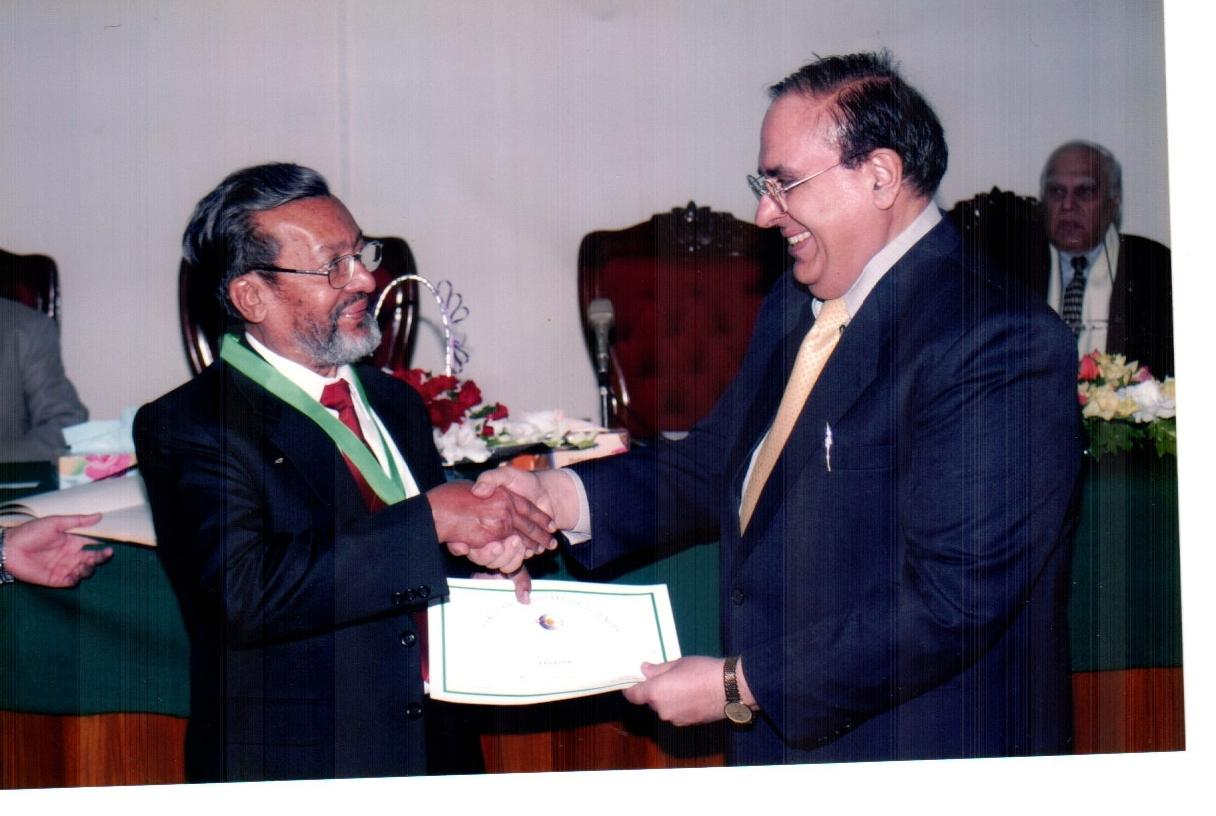
10th National Ranking in Biology from the Pakistan Council for Science & Technology, 2000

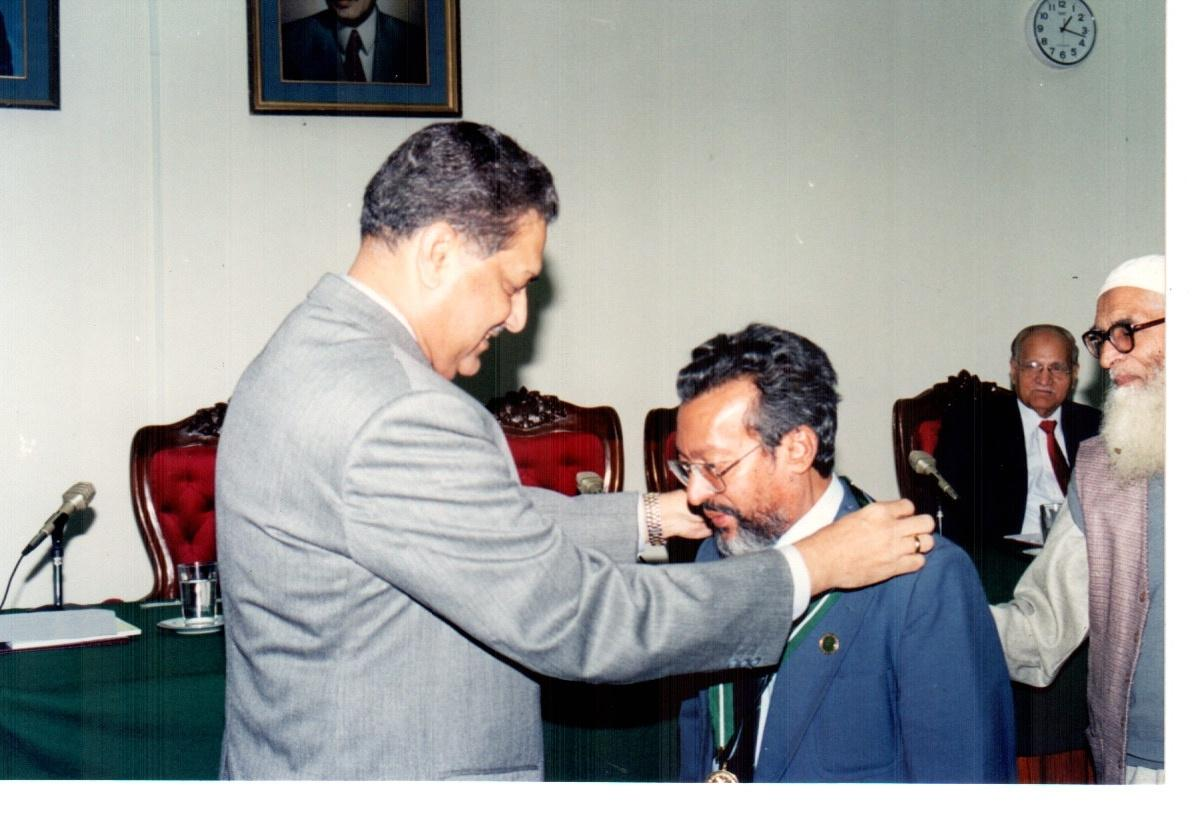
Izaz-i-Fazeelat given by Dr. Abdul Qadeer Khan in Islamabad, Pakistan in 2000

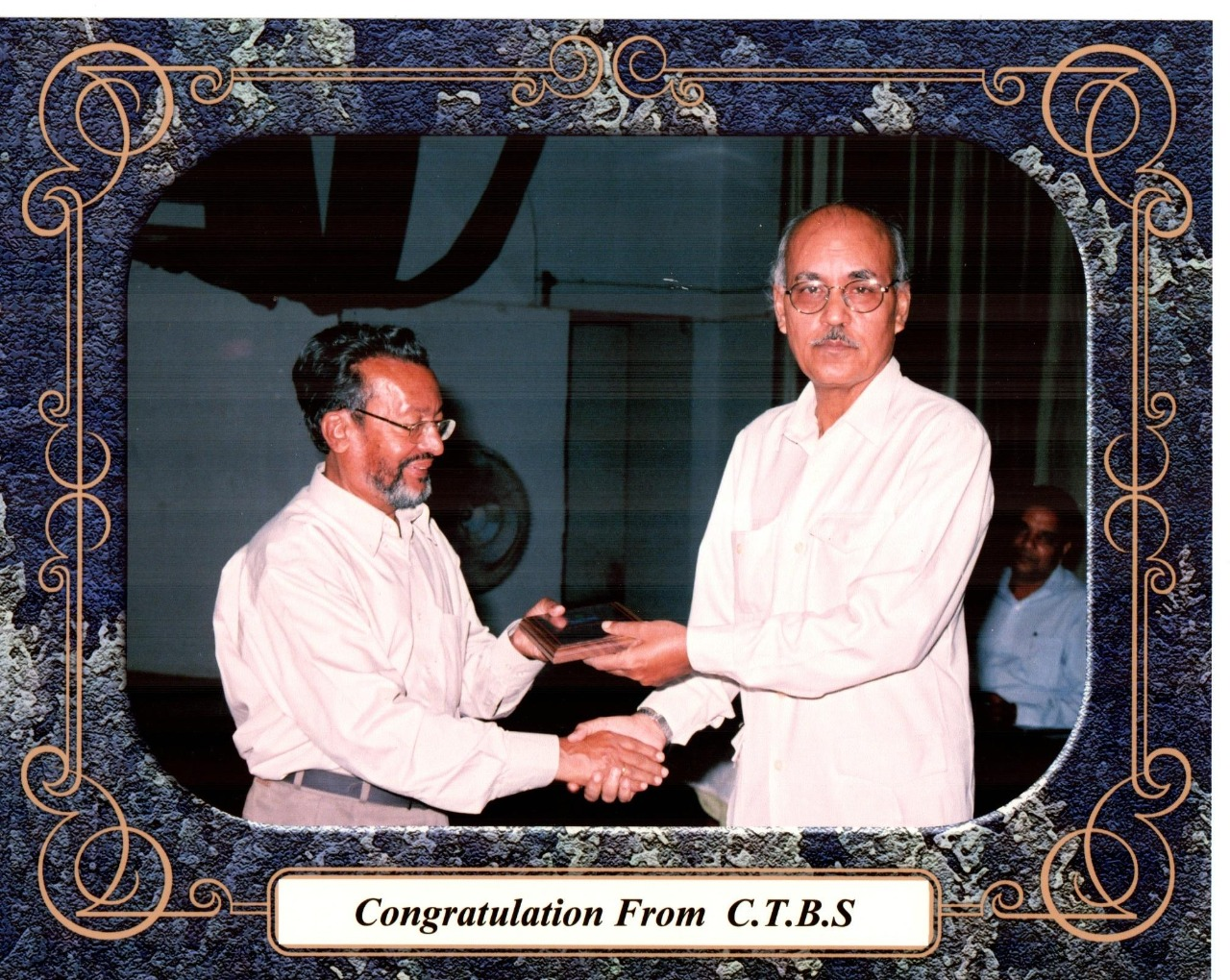
Shield of Honour by College Teachers Botanical Society, Karachi, Pakistan in 2001

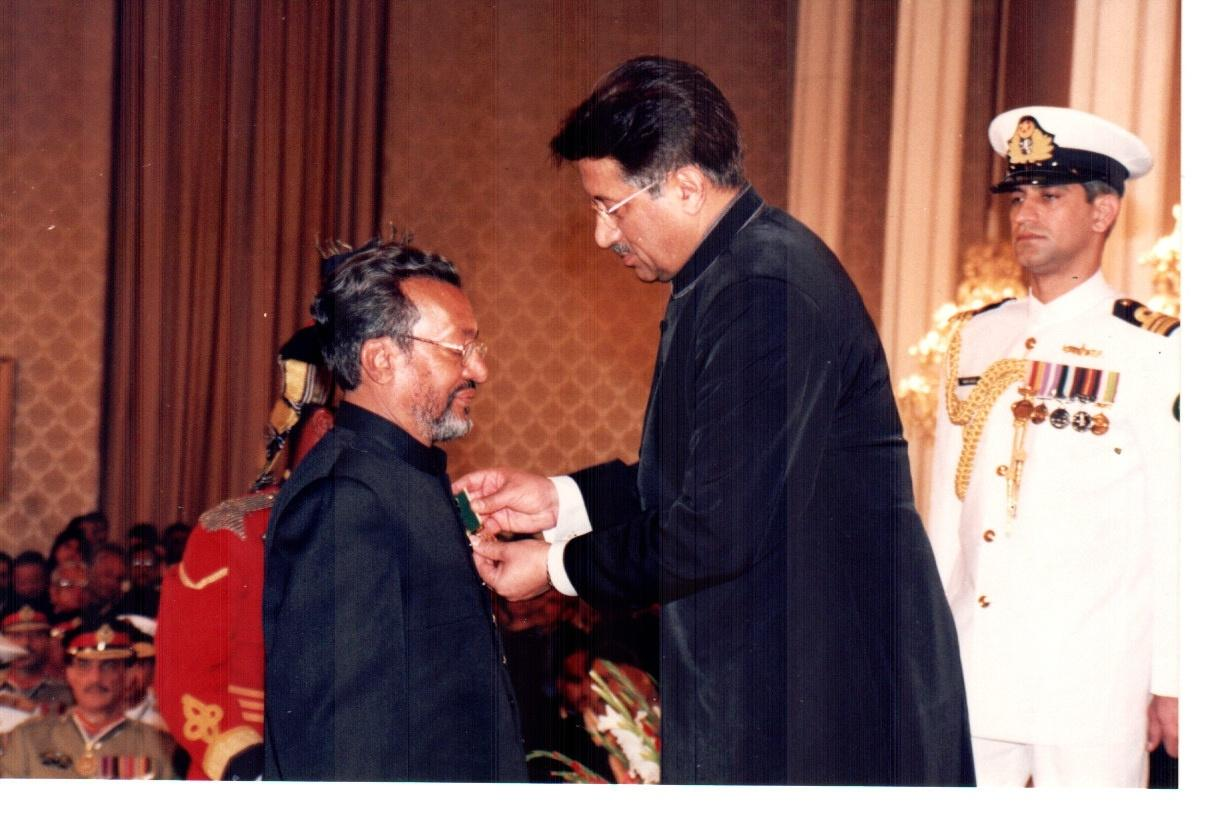
President Pervez Musharraf honoring Mustafa Shameel with the Tamgha-i-Imtiaz, 2001

== Death ==
Mustafa Shameel died on 13 May 2013 at his residence in Karachi. He is survived by his wife, Dr. Suraiya Shameel, adjunct professor, Department of Urdu, University of Karachi and two daughters, Dr. Simin Khaliq and Dr. Naushin Fahad.

== Publications ==
Mustafa Shameel authored more than 330 scientific publications and 8 books. He also wrote poetry, especially for children. A Research Publications:

1 Shameel M & Nizamuddin M 1972 Morphology and development of a new alga, Haloplegma anwerii (Ceramiaceae) from Karachi Coast. Nova Hedwigia 23(2/3): 433-444 (Germany).

2 Shameel M & Ohno M 1972 Some observations on the effect of high hydrostatic pressure on the thallus weight of certain marine algae (in Japanese). Rep Usa Mar Biol Stat 19(2): 1-6 (Japan).

3 Shameel M 1973 Untersuchungen über den Einfluß des hydrostatischen Druckes auf den O2 - Gaswechsel mariner benthischer Algen (in German). Int Revue ges Hydrobiol 58(5): 741-782 (Germany).

4 Shameel M 1973 Reproduction induced by high hydrostatic pressure in Cladophora glomerata (L.) Kütz. from Baltic Sea. Pak J Bot 5(1): 1-9 (Pakistan).

5 Shameel M 1973 Effect of high hydrostatic pressure on the cell wall of Polysiphonia nigrescens and P. urceolata from Baltic Sea. Pak J Bot 5(2): 98-100 (Pakistan).

6 Shameel M 1974 Effect of hydrostatic pressure on the redistribution of cell organelles in Bryopsis plumosa (Huds.) C. Ag. Pak J Bot 6(1): 83-84 (Pakistan).

7 Shameel M 1974 Effect of hydrostatic pressure on the cell wall of Callithamnion corymbosum (Smith) Lyngb. Pak J Bot 6(2): 151-156 (Pakistan).

8 Shameel M 1975 Observations regarding phylogenetic position of Dichotomosiphonales (Bryopsido-phyceae). Pak J Bot 7(1): 19-31 (Pakistan).

9 Shameel M 1975 Activity of alkaline phosphatase in some seaweeds under the influence of hydrostatic pressure and temperature. Pak J Bot 7(2): 169-173 (Pakistan).

10 Shameel M 1975 Untersuchungen über die Wirkung des hydrostatischen Druckes auf das Wachstum von Delesseria sanguinea (L.) Lamour. aus der westlichen Ostsee (in German). Hydrobiologia 47(2): 209-230 (The Netherlands).

11 Shameel M 1975 Influence of hydrostatic pressure on the enzyme systems of marine organisms. Pak J Sci 27(1/2): 95-104 (Pakistan).

12 Shameel M 1976 Changes in the cellular morphology of Bryopsis plumosa (Bryopsidophyceae) under high hydrostatic pressure and temperature. Pak J Bot 8(2): 103-110 (Pakistan).

13 Shameel M 1977 Combined effects of hydrostatic pressure and temperature on the activity of alkaline phosphatases from Delesseria sanguinea (L.) Lamour. Pak J Bot 9(1): 17-23 (Pakistan).

14 Shameel M 1978 Effect of temperature on the pressure induced reproduction in Cladophora vagabunda (L.) Hoek. Pak J Bot 10(1): 65-72 (Pakistan).

15 Shameel M 1978 Comparative effects of pressure, temperature and oxygen tension on photosynthetic and respiratory rates in Porphyra umbilicalis (L.) J. Ag. Pak J Bot 10(2): 119-131 (Pakistan).

16 Shameel M 1978 Additions to the knowledge about Caulerpa Lamouroux (Bryopsidophyceae) from the coast of Karachi. Botanica Marina 21(5): 277-282 (Germany).

17 Shameel M 1978 Contributions to the Chaetophoraceae (Chlorophyta) of the coast of Karachi. Botanica Marina 21(6): 387-391 (Germany).

18 Shameel M 1978 Contributions to Ulothrix (Chlorophyceae) from Swat, Pakistan. Nova Hedwigia 30(4): 377-384 (Germany).

19 Shameel M 1979 Influence of hydrostatic pressure on the release of dissolved organic substances from Fucus vesiculosus (Phaeophyta). Pak J Bot 11(1): 1-11 (Pakistan).

20 Shameel M 1980 Influence of salinity on the rates of photosynthesis and respiration in Ulva indica Anand. Pak J Bot 12(1): 77-80 (Pakistan).

21 Shameel M 1980 Influence of desiccation on the photosynthetic and respiratory activities of a marine green alga, Ulva indica. Pak J Bot 12(2): 195-199 (Pakistan).

22 Shameel M 1983 Effects of emergence and salinity on the photosynthetic and respiratory activities of Ulva fasciata Delile (Chlorophyta). Pak J Bot 15(2): 73-78 (Pakistan).

23 Shameel M 1983 Notes on the seaweeds of Tripoli, Libya. Pak J Bot 15(2): 79-83 (Pakistan).

24 Shameel M & Butt NI 1984 On the occurrence of Cyanophyta from Karachi, Pakistan. Pak J Bot 16(1): 75-79 (Pakistan).

25 Shameel M 1984 Observations on Ulothrix shameelii Faridi (Chlorophyta). Pak J Bot 16(2): 275-277 (Pakistan).

26 Usmanghani K, Shameel M, Sualeh M, Khan K & Mahmood ZA 1984 Antibacterial and antifungal activities of marine algae from Karachi Seashore of Pakistan. Fitoterapia 55(2): 73-77 (Italy).

27 Moazzam M & Shameel M 1985 Studies on Bangiophyceae (Rhodophyta) from the coast of Karachi. Pak J Bot 17(1): 141-152 (Pakistan).

28 Usmanghani K, Shameel M & Alam M 1985 Fatty acids of the seaweed Ulva fasciata (Chlorophyta). Scientia Pharmaceutica 53: 247-251 (Austria).

29 Bano S, Bano N, Ahmad VU, Shameel M & Amjad S 1986 Marine natural products: 3-formylindole from the red algae Botryocladia leptopoda. J Nat Prod 49(3): 549 (USA).

30 Usmanghani K & Shameel M 1986 Studies on the antimicrobial activity of certain seaweeds from Karachi Coast. In Ahmad R & San Pietro A (eds): Prospects for Biosaline Research. Proc US-Pak Biosal Res Worksh Karachi p 519-526 (Pakistan).

31 Usmanghani K, Shameel M & Alam M 1986 Studies on fatty acids of a green alga Ulva fasciata from Karachi Coast. In Ahmad R & San Pietro A (eds): Prospects for Biosaline Research. Proc US-Pak Biosal Res Worksh Karachi p 527-531 (Pakistan).

32 Bano S, Bano N, Ahmad VU & Shameel M 1986 Isolation of natural products from a seaweed Botryocladia leptopoda (Rhodophyta) of Karachi Coast. In Ahmad R & San Pietro A (Eds): Prospects for Biosaline Research. Proc US-Pak Biosal Res Worksh Karachi p 533-538 (Pakistan).

33 Bano S, Ahmad VU, Perveen S, Bano N, Shafiuddin & Shameel M 1987 Marine natural products: II. Chemical constituents of red alga Botryocladia leptopoda. Planta Medica 53(1): 117-118 (Germany).

34 Usmanghani K, Shameel M, Siddiqui S & Siddiqui SA 1987 Studies on the fatty acids of Iyengaria stellata (Scytosiphonales, Phaeophyta). Botanica Marina 30(4): 305-307 (Germany).

35 Bano S, Perveen S, Ahmad VU, Shafiuddin, Bano N & Shameel M 1987 Chemical constituents of Endarachne binghamiae (Scytosiphonales, Phaeophyta). Botanica Marina 30(5): 371-372 (Germany).

36 Usmanghani K, Shameel M, Siddiqui S & Alam M 1987 Studies on the sterols of a brown seaweed Iyengaria stellata from Pakistan. Pak J Bot 19(2): 249-252 (Pakistan).

37 Bano S, Shafiuddin, Perveen S, Bano N, Ahmad VU & Shameel M 1987 Chemical constituents of red algae Acanthophora dendroides and Halymenia porphyroides. Pak J Bot 19(2): 253-257 (Pakistan).

38 Shameel M 1987 A preliminary survey of seaweeds from the coast of Lasbela, Pakistan. Botanica Marina 30(6): 511-515 (Germany).

39 Shameel M 1987 Studies on the fatty acids from seaweeds of Karachi. In Ilahi I & Hussain F (Eds): Modern Trends of Plant Science Research in Pakistan. Proc Nat Conf Pl Scient 3: 183-186 (Pakistan).

40 Shameel M & Afaq-Husain S 1987 Survey of algal flora from Lasbela Coast. In Ilahi I & Hussain F (Eds): Modern Trends of Plant Science Research in Pakistan. Proc Nat Conf Pl Scient 3: 292-299 (Pakistan).

41 Bano S, Hayee A, Ahmad VU, Shaikh W, Usmanghani K & Shameel M 1988 Marine natural products. Part VII. Steroids from a red alga Asparagopsis sandfordiana. Polish J Chem 62: 905-906 (Poland).

42 Shameel M, Afaq-Husain S & Shahid-Husain S 1989 Addition to the knowledge of seaweeds from the coast of Lasbela, Pakistan. Botanica Marina 32(2): 177-180 (Germany).

43 Shameel M & Khan R 1989 Phycochemical studies on fatty acid composition in Caulerpa (Bryopsido-phyceae). Pak J Bot 21(2): 343-346 (Pakistan).

44 Shameel M & Khan R 1990 Fatty acid composition of Ulva (Chlorophyceae). Pak J Bot 22(1): 39-42 (Pakistan).

45 Shameel M 1990 Phycochemical studies on fatty acids from certain seaweeds. Botanica Marina 33(5): 429-432 (Germany).

46 Shaikh W, Shameel M, Hayee-Memon A, Usmanghani K, Bano S & Ahmad VU 1990 Isolation and characterization of chemical constituents of Stoechospermum marginatum (Dictyotales, Phaeophyta) and their antimicrobial activity. Pak J Pharm Sci 3(2): 1-9 (Pakistan).

47 Shaikh W, Shameel M, Khan R, Usmanghani K & Ahmad VU 1990 Phycochemical studies on Spatoglossum variabile (Dictyotales, Phaeophyta). Pak J Bot 22(2): 100-105 (Pakistan).

48 Ahmad VU, Bano S, Shaikh W, Uddin S & Shameel M 1990 Isolation and structure determination of 1,1,6,6-tetrachloro-3, 4-diphenyl hexane from brown alga Dictyota dichotoma. Pak J Sci Ind Res 33(10): 428-430 (Pakistan).

49 Ahmad VU, Parveen S, Bano S, Shaikh W & Shameel M 1991 Dolastane diterpenoids from the brown alga Dictyota indica. Phytochemistry 30(3): 1015-1018 (UK).

50 Atta-ur-Rahman, Shah Z, Choudhary MI, Abbas SA & Shameel M 1991 Stockerene - a noval linear metabolite from Stockeyia indica. Fitoterapia 62(1): 77-80 (Italy).

51 Shaikh W, Shameel M, Ahmad VU & Usmanghani K 1991 Phycochemical studies on Colpomenia sinuosa (Scytosiphonales, Phaeophyta). Botanica Marina 34(2): 77-79 (Germany).

52 Afaq-Husain S & Shameel M 1991 The structure and reproduction of a new species Helminthocladia nizamuddinii (Nemaliales-Rhodophyta). Botanica Marina 34(2): 81-89 (Germany).

53 Hayee-Memon A, Shameel M, Ahmad M, Ahmad VU & Usmanghani K 1991 Phycochemical studies on Gracilaria foliifera (Gigartinales, Rhodophyta). Botanica Marina 34(2): 107-111 (Germany).

54 Hayee-Memon A, Shameel M, Usmanghani K & Ahmad VU 1991 Phycochemical studies on Scinaia fascicularis (Bonnemaisoniales, Rhodophyta). Pak J Pharm Sci 4(1): 27-34 (Pakistan).

55 Shaikh W, Shameel M, Usmanghani K & Ahmad VU 1991 Phycochemical examination of Padina tetrastromatica (Dictyotales, Phaeophyta). Pak J Pharm Sci 4(1): 55-61 (Pakistan).

56 Afaq-Husain S, Nizamuddin M & Shameel M 1991 The structure and reproduction of a new taxon Dermonema abbottiae (Nemaliales-Rhodophyta) from the coast of Pakistan. Pak J Sci Ind Res 34(2-3): 75-82 (Pakistan).

57 Afaq-Husain S, Shameel M, Usmanghani K, Ahmad M & Ahmad VU 1991 Phycochemical studies on Dermonema abbottiae (Nemaliales-Rhodophyta). Botanica Marina 34(3): 215-220 (Germany).

58 Hayee-Memon A, Shameel M, Usmanghani K, Ahmad M & Ahmad VU 1991 Phycochemical examination of Hypnea valentiae (Gigartinales, Rhodophyta). Pak J Bot 23(1): 33-39 (Pakistan).

59 Afaq-Husain S, Shameel M, Usmanghani K, Ahmad M, Perveen S Ahmad VU 1991 Brominated sesquiterpene metabolites of Hypnea pannosa (Gigartinales, Rhodophyta). J Appl Phycol 3(2): 111-113 (Belgium).

60 Ahmad VU, Ali MS, Bano S & Shameel M 1991 Pinnatifolide, a new metabolite from red alga Laurencia pinnatifida Lamour. Pak J Sci Ind Res 34(5): 161-162 (Pakistan).

61 Aliya R, Shameel M, Usmanghani K & Ahmad VU 1991 Analysis of fatty acids from Codium iyengarii (Bryopsidophyceae). Pak J Pharm Sci 4(2): 103-111 (Pakistan).

62 Shaikh W, Shameel M, Usmanghani K & Ahmad VU 1991 Studies on the fatty acids of Dictyota species from Pakistan. Pak J Pharm Sci 4(2): 125-130 (Pakistan).

63 Hayee-Memon A, Shameel M, Usmanghani K, Ahmad M & Ahmad VU 1991 Phycochemical investigations on Centroceras clavulatum (Ceramiales, Rhodophyta). Pak J Pharm Sci 4(2): 137-144 (Pakistan).

64 Atta-ur-Rahman, Alvi KA, Abbas SA, Sultana T, Shameel M, Choudhary MI & Clardy JC 1991 A diterpenoid lactone from Aplysia juliana. J Nat Prod 54(3): 886-888 (USA).

65 Shameel M, Shaikh W & Khan R 1991 Comparative fatty acid composition of five species of Dictyota (Phaeophyta). Botanica Marina 34(5): 425-428 (Germany).

66 Shameel M & Khan R 1991 Fatty acid composition of nine green seaweeds. Botanica Marina 34(6): 501-504 (Germany).

67 Ahmad VU, Aliya R, Perveen S & Shameel M 1992 A sterol glycoside from marine green alga Codium iyengarii. Phytochemistry 31(4): 1429-1431 (UK).

68 Hayee-Memon A, Shameel M, Usmanghani K & Ahmad VU 1992 Fatty acid composition of three species of Hypnea (Gigartinales, Rhodophyta) from Karachi Coast. Pak J Mar Sci 1(1): 7-10 (Pakistan).

69 Ahmad VU, Perveen S, Ali MS, Uddin S, Aliya R & Shameel M 1992 Sterol composition of marine algae from Karachi Coast of Arabian Sea. Pak J Mar Sci 1(1): 57-64 (Pakistan).

70 Aliya R, Shameel M, Usmanghani K & Ahmad VU 1992 Comparative composition of fatty acids of Codium decorticatum and C. flabellatum (Bryopsidophyceae). Pak J Pharm Sci 5(1): 87-99 (Pakistan).

71 Afaq-Husain S, Shameel M & Khan R 1992 Phycochemical investigations on four species of Hypnea (Gigartinales, Rhodophyta). Botanica Marina 35(2): 141-146 (Germany).

72 Shameel M & Tanaka J 1992 A preliminary check-list of marine algae from the coast and inshore waters of Pakistan. In Nakaike T & Malik S (Eds): Cryptogamic Flora of Pakistan. Vol 1 Nat Sci Mus Tokyo p 1-64 (Japan).

73 Tanaka J & Shameel M 1992 Macroalgae in mangrove forests of Pakistan. In Nakaike T & Malik S (Eds): Cryptogamic Flora of Pakistan. Vol 1 Nat Sci Mus Tokyo p 75-85 (Japan).

74 Naqvi SBS, Sheikh D, Usmanghani K, Shameel M & Sheikh R 1992 Screening of marine algae of Karachi for haemagglutinin activity. Pak J Pharm Sci 5(2): 129-138 (Pakistan).

75 Shameel M & Shaukat SS 1992 A taxometric study of three related species of Caulerpa (Bryopsidophyceae) from northern Arabian Sea. Marine Research 1(1): 1-7 (Pakistan).

76 Hayee-Memon A, Shameel M, Usmanghani K & Ahmad VU 1992 Marine natural products from Porphyra vietnamensis (Bangiales, Rhodophyta). Marine Research 1(1): 9-13 (Pakistan).

77 Ahmad VU, Aliya R, Perveen S & Shameel M 1993 Sterols from marine green alga Codium decor-ticatum. Phytochemistry 33(5): 1189-1192 (UK).

78 Amjad MT & Shameel M 1993 Two new species and two new reports of Ulva L. (Ulvophyceae) from the coast of Karachi, Pakistan. Pak J Mar Sci 2(1): 5-16 (Pakistan).

79 Siddiqui S, Naqvi SBS, Usmanghani K & Shameel M 1993 Antibacterial activity and fatty acid composition of the extract from Hypnea musciformis (Gigartinales, Rhodophyta). Pak J Pharm Sci 6(1): 45-51 (Pakistan).

80 Aliya R & Shameel M 1993 Phycochemical examination of three species of Codium (Bryopsidophyceae). Botanica Marina 36(5): 371-376 (Germany).

81 Amjad MT & Shameel M 1993 Comparative haemagglutinic activity in the species of Caulerpa and Ulva (Chlorophyta) of Karachi Coast. Pak J Mar Sci 2(2): 113-117 (Pakistan).

82 Shameel M 1993 Phycochemical studies on the fatty acid composition of twelve littoral green seaweeds of Karachi Coast. In Tirmizi NM & Kazmi QB (Eds): Proceedings of the National Seminar on Study and Management in Coastal Zones in Pakistan. Pak Nat Commis UNESCO Karachi p 17-25 (Pakistan).

83 Shameel M & Aftab J 1993 Thallus structure, reproduction and antifungal activity of Porphyra vietna-mensis (Bangiales, Rhodophyta) from Karachi Coast. Marine Research 2(1-2): 11-16 (Pakistan).

84 Aliya R, Shameel M, Usmanghani K & Ahmad VU 1993 Fatty acid composition of five species of Caulerpa (Bryopsidophyceae) from north Arabian Sea. Marine Research 2(1-2): 25-34 (Pakistan).

85 Aliya R, Shameel M, Perveen S, Ali MS, Usmanghani K & Ahmad VU 1994 Acyclic diterpene alcohols isolated from four algae of Bryopsidophyceae and their toxicity. Pak J Mar Sci 3(1): 15-24 (Pakistan).

86 Ahmad VU, Parveen S, Uddin S, Bano S, Shaikh W & Shameel M 1994 Isolation and structure elucidation of sterols from the brown algae Myriogloia sciurus and Spatoglossum variabile. Hamdard Medicus 37(2): 54-59 (Pakistan).

87 Siddiqui S, Usmanghani K & Shameel M 1994 Sterol and fatty acid composition of a marine alga Bryopsis pennata (Bryopsidophyceae, Chlorophyta). Pak J Pharm Sci 7(1): 73-82 (Pakistan).

88 Aslam M, Ahmad M, Rizwani GH, Anwar M, Ahmad VU & Shameel M 1994 Fatty acids composition and antimicrobial activity of Dictyopteris australis (Phaeophyta). Pak J Pharmacol 11(2): 21-27 (Pakistan).

89 Usmanghani K & Shameel M 1994 Fatty acid composition of seaweeds of Pakistan. In Ali SS & Saify ZS (Eds): Proceedings of 1st International Conference on Pharmaceutical Sciences. Vol 1 Pathway to Pharmaceutical Sciences. Fac Pharm Univ Kar Karachi p 95-110 (Pakistan).

90 Shaikh W & Shameel M 1995 Taxonomic study of brown algae commonly growing on the coast of Karachi, Pakistan. Pak J Mar Sci 4(1): 9-38 (Pakistan).

91 Aisha K & Shameel M 1995 Some freshwater green algae near Balochistan Coast of Pakistan. Pak J Bot 27(1): 41-48 (Pakistan).

92 Shaikh W, Shameel M & Ahmad VU 1995 Phycochemical studies on sterols from three brown seaweeds of northern Arabian Sea. Pak J Mar Sci 4(2): 107-113 (Pakistan).

93 Aliya R, Shameel M, Usmanghani K, Sabiha S & Ahmad VU 1995 Fatty acid composition of two siphonaceous green algae from the coast of Karachi. Pak J Pharm Sci 8(2): 47-54 (Pakistan).

94 Aliya R, Shameel M, Usmanghani K, Sabiha S & Ahmad VU 1995 Fatty acid composition of two species of Cladophorales (Bryopsidophyceae) from north Arabian Sea. Marine Research 4(2): 153-159 (Pakistan).

95 Aliya R, Shameel M, Usmanghani K & Ahmad VU 1995 Comparative composition of fatty acids in twelve coenocytic green seaweeds of the northern Arabian Sea. In Thompson M-F & Tirmizi NM (Eds): The Arabian Sea Living Marine Resources and the Environment. Vangaurd Books Ltd Lahore p 207-214 (Pakistan).

96 Afaq-Husain S & Shameel M 1996 Systematic studies on Udotea indica A. Gepp & E. Gepp (Cauler-pales, Bryopsidophyceae) populations collected in Pakistan. Candollea 51(1): 7-17 (Switzerland).

97 Shameel M, Aisha K & Khan SH 1996 A preliminary survey of seaweeds from the coast of Makran, Pakistan. Botanica Marina 39(3): 223-230 (Germany).

98 Ahmad VU, Hayee-Memon A, Ali MS, Perveen S & Shameel M 1996 Somalenone, a C26 sterol from marine red alga Melanothamnus somalensis. Phytochemistry 42(4): 1141-1143 (UK).

99 Usmanghani K & Shameel M 1996 Fatty acid composition of seaweeds of Pakistan. Pak J Pharm Sci 9(2): 53-68 (Pakistan).

100 Aliya R & Shameel M 1996 Taxonomic study of coenocytic green algae commonly growing on the coast of Karachi. Pak J Mar Sci 5(1): 47-68 (Pakistan).

101 Afaq-Husain S & Shameel M 1996 Morphology, anatomy and reproduction of the populations of a new alga Gelidium usmanghanii (Gelidiales, Rhodophyta). Candollea 51(2): 433-443 (Switzerland).

102 Hayee-Memon A & Shameel M 1996 A taxonomic study of some red algae commonly growing on the coast of Karachi. Pak J Mar Sci 5(2): 113-137 (Pakistan).

103 Atta-ur-Rahman, Khan AM, Shabbir M, Abid M, Chaudhary MI, Nasreen A, Maqbool MA, Shameel M & Sualeh R 1997 Nematocidal study of marine organisms. Pak J Nematol 15(1&2): 95-100 (Pakistan).

104 Atta-ur-Rahman, Choudhary MI, Majeed A, Shabbir M, Ghani U & Shameel M 1997 Succinylanthranilic acid ester and other bioactive constituents of Jolyna laminarioides. Phytochemistry 46(7): 1215-1218 (UK).

105 Afaq-Husain S & Shameel M 1997 Observations on Gelidium pusillum (Stackh.) Le Jolis (Rhodophyta) from the coast of Pakistan. Pak J Bot 29(2): 185-190 (Pakistan).

106 Afaq-Husain S & Shameel M 1997 Structure, development and reproduction of a new species Scinaia saifullahii (Bonnemaisoniales, Rhodophyta) from the north Arabian Sea. Pak J Sci Ind Res 40(5-12): 104-113 (Pakistan).

107 Aliya R & Shameel M 1998 Phycochemical investigations on air-dried material of five species of Caulerpa (Bryopsidophyceae). Botanica Marina 41(2): 125-132 (Germany).

108 Khaliq-uz-Zaman SM, Shameel S, Shameel M, Leghari SM & Ahmad VU 1998 Bioactive compounds in Chara corallina var. wallichii (A. Br.) R.D. Wood (Charophyta). Pak J Bot 30(1): 19-31 (Pakistan).

109 Afaq-Husain S & Shameel M 1998 Validity of Scinaia saifullahii (Florideophyceae). Pak J Bot 30(2): 301-303 (Pakistan).

110 Shameel M 1999 Melanothamnus afaqhusainii, a new red alga from the coast of Karachi. Pak J Bot 31(1): 211-214 (Pakistan).

111 Shaikh W & Shameel M 1999 Fatty acid analysis of Hincksia mitchelliae (Ectocarpales, Phaeophyta). Pak J Mar Biol 5(1): 59-64 (Pakistan).

112 Aliya R & Shameel M 1999 Phycochemical evaluation of four coenoyctic green seaweeds from the coast of Karachi. Pak J Mar Biol 5(1): 65-76 (Pakistan).

113 Hayee-Memon A & Shameel M 1999 Fatty acid composition of Sebdenia flabellata (Gigarlinales, Rhodophyta). Pak J Mar Biol 5(1): 77-82 (Pakistan).

114 Afaq-Husain S & Shameel M 1999 Studies on the structure and reproduction of populations of Cystoseira indica (Fucales, Phaeophyta) from Pakistan. Botanica Marina 42(6): 593-598 (Germany).

115 Afaq-Husain S & Shameel M 1999 Further studies on Gelidium (Rhodophyta) from the coast of Pakistan. Pak J Bot 31(2): 371-382 (Pakistan).

116 Hayee-Memon A, Shameel M & Ahmad VU 1999 Fatty acid composition of Sebdenia flabellata (Gigartinales, Rhodophyta). In Ahmad M & Rizwani GH (Eds): Herb Medicines and Therapeutics. Dept Pharmacog Univ Karachi p13-21 (Pakistan).

117 Shameel S, Khaliq-uz-Zaman SM, Shameel M, Leghari SM & Ahmad VU 1999 Phycochemical investigations on Chara wallichii A. Braun. In Ahmad M & Rizwani GH (Eds): Herb Medicines and Therapeutics. Dept Pharmacog Univ Karachi p 156-174 (Pakistan).

118 Shaikh W, Shameel M & Ahmad VU 1999 Fatty acid analysis of Hincksia mitchelliae (Ectocarpales, Phaeophyta). In Ahmad M & Rizwani GH (Eds): Herb Medicines and Therapeutics. Dept Pharmacog Univ Karachi p 203-210 (Pakistan).

119 Shaikh W & Shameel M 1999 Studies on the phycochemistry of Cystoseira indica (Fucales, Phaeophyta). Pak J Mar Biol 5(2): 165-175 (Pakistan).

120 Hayee-Memon A & Shameel M 1999 Phycochemical studies on Melanothamnus afaqhusainii (Ceramiales, Rhodophyta). Pak J Mar Biol 5(2): 185-194 (Pakistan).

121 Afaq-Husain S & Shameel M 2000 Further investigations on the red alga Melanothamnus afaqhusainii (Ceramiales) from the coast of Pakistan. Pak J Bot 32(1): 15-26 (Pakistan).

122 Shameel M, Khan SH & Afaq-Husain S 2000 Biodiversity of marine benthic algae along the coast of Balochistan, Pakistan. Pak J Mar Biol 6(1): 69-100 (Pakistan).

123 Hameed S, Ahmed M & Shameel M 2000 Distribution of commonly occurring seaweeds with their tidal heights on the rocky bench of Pacha near Karachi, Pakistan. Pak J Mar Biol 6(1): 101-112 (Pakistan).

124 Hameed S, Ahmed M & Shameel M 2000 An ecological study on the tide pools of the rocky ledge at Pacha, near Karachi (Pakistan). Pak J Mar Biol 6(2): 179-197 (Pakistan).

125 Rizvi MA, Farooqui S & Shameel M 2000 Bioactivity and elemental composition of certain seaweeds from Karachi Coast. Pak J Mar Biol 6(2): 207-218 (Pakistan).

126 Shameel M 2000 Biodiversity of the seaweeds growing along Balochistan Coast of the northern Arabian Sea. In Ahmad VU (Ed): Proc Natl ONR Symp on Arabian Sea as a Resource of Biological Diversity. HEJ Res Inst Chem Univ Karachi p 45-64 (Pakistan).

127 Afaq-Husain S & Shameel M 2001: Structure and reproduction of Scinaia moniliformis pakistanensis var. nov. (Nemaliales, Rhodophyta). Pak J Bot 33(1): 53-68 (Pakistan).

128 Hameed S, Ahmed M & Shameel M 2001 Community structure and species composition of macroorganisms at the rocky bench of Pacha near Karachi, Pakistan. Pak J Mar Biol 7(1&2): 135-146 (Pakistan).

129 Shameel M 2001 An approach to the classification of algae in the new millennium. Pak J Mar Biol 7(1&2): 233-250 (Pakistan).

130 Khaliq-uz-Zaman SM, Simin K & Shameel M 2001 Antimicrobial activity and phytotoxicity of sterols from Chara wallichii A. Br. (Charophyta). Pak J Sci Ind Res 44(5): 301-304 (Pakistan).

131 Rizvi MA & Shameel M 2001 Distribution of elements in marine algae of Karachi Coast. Pak J Bot 33(4): 357-363 (Pakistan).

132 Shameel M 2001: Diversity exhibited by marine benthic algae inhabiting the coast of Balochistan. Pak J Mar Sci 10(2): 87-103 (Pakistan).

133 Rizvi MA, Farooqui S & Shameel M 2001 Estimation of elements in seaweeds of Karachi Coast. Pak J Bot 33 (sp issue): 737-742 (Pakistan).

134 Rizvi MA, Farooqui S, Khan M & Shameel M 2001 Elemental composition and bioactivity of seaweeds from coastal areas of Karachi, Pakistan. J KAU: Mar Sci 12 (Sp Issue): 209-215 (Saudi Arabia).

135 Shameel M 2002 Occurrence of a new species of Chara (Charophyta) near Balochistan Coast of Pakistan. Pak J Bot 34(2): 93-100 (Pakistan).

136 Shameel M 2002 A new approach to the classification of algae. Hamdard Medicus 45(4): 5-16 (Pakistan).

137 Rizvi MA, Farooqui S & Shameel M 2002 Elemental composition of marine algae from the coastal area of Karachi, Pakistan. Hamdard Medicus 45(4): 17-24 (Pakistan).

138 Shameel M 2003 Biodiversity and natural history of algae. J Nat Hist Wildl 2(1): 1-9 (Pakistan).

139 Rizvi MA & Shameel M 2003 Detection of elements in seaweeds from different areas of Karachi Coast. Pak J Mar Sci 12(1): 41-48 (Pakistan).

140 Aliya R & Shameel M 2003 Marine natural products of Caulerpa (Siphonocladophyceae). Pak J Bot 35(5): 659-669 (Pakistan).

141 Ghazala B, Shameel M, Choudhary MI, Shahzad S & Leghari SM 2003 Phycochemistry and bioactivity of certain freshwater green algae of Sindh. Pak J Bot 35(5): 695-704 (Pakistan).

142 Rizvi MA & Shameel M 2003 Biological activity and elementology of benthic algae from Karachi Coast. Pak J Bot 35(5): 717-729 (Pakistan).

143 Naz S, Shameel M, Masud-ul-Hasan & Shafique-ur-Rehman 2003 Survey of freshwater Cyanophyta from certain areas of northern region of Pakistan and Azad Kashmir. Pak J Bot 35(5): 731-741 (Pakistan).

144 Naz S, Masud-ul Hasan & Shameel M 2004 Taxonomic study of Chroocophyceae (Cyanophyta) from northern areas of Pakistan. Pak J Bot 36(2): 247-281 (Pakistan).

145 Naz S, Masud-ul-Hasan & Shameel M 2004 Taxonomic study of Anabaina Bory (Nostocophyceae, Cyanophyta) from northern areas of Pakistan. Pak J Bot 36 (2): 283-295 (Pakistan).

146 Ghazala B, Shameel M, Choudhary, MI, Shahzad S & Leghari SM 2004 Phycochemistry and bioactivity of Zygnema (Zygnemophyceae) from Sindh. Int J Biol Biotech 1(3): 335-342 (Pakistan).

147 Ghazala B, Shameel M, Choudhary MI, Shahzad S & Leghari SM 2004 Phycochemistry and bioactivity of two microalgae (Volvocophyta) from Sindh. Int J Biol Biotech 1(3): 343-350 (Pakistan).

148 Shameel M 2004 Impact of barobiology on the biodiversity of marine algae. J Nat Hist Wildl 3(1): 45-50 (Pakistan).

149 Naz S, Masud-ul-Hasan & Shameel M 2004 Biodiversity of Oscillatoria (Nostocophyceae, Cyanophyta) from northern areas of Pakistan. Pak J Bot 36(3): 483-510 (Pakistan).

150 Ghazala B, Shameel M, Choudhary MI, Shahzad S & Leghari SM 2004 Phycochemistry and bioactivity of Tetraspora (Volvocophyta) from Sindh. Pak J Bot 36(3): 511-527 (Pakistan).

151 Naz S, Masud-ul-Hasan & Shameel M 2004 Taxonomic study of the genus Calothrix (Nostocophyceae, Cyanophyta) from Lahore, Pakistan. Int J Biol Biotech 1(4): 459-464 (Pakistan).

152 Naz S, Masud-ul-Hasan & Shameel M 2004 Biodiversity of the genus Lyngbya (Nostocophyceae, Cyanophyta) in the northern areas of Pakistan. Int J Biol Biotech 1(4): 465-474 (Pakistan).

153 Naz S, Masud-ul-Hasan & Shameel M 2004 Taxonomic study of the genus Spirulina (Nostocophyceae, Cyanophyta) from northern areas of Pakistan. Int J Biol Biotech 1(4): 475-480 (Pakistan).

154 Ghazala B, Naila B, Shameel M, Shahzad S & Leghari SM 2004 Phycochemistry and bioactivity of two stonewort algae (Charophyta) of Sindh. Pak J Bot 36(4): 733-743 (Pakistan).

155 Rizvi MA & Shameel M 2004 Studies on the bioactivity and elementology of marine algae from the coast of Karachi, Pakistan. Pytotherapeutic Research 18(11): 865-872 (UK).

156 Naz S, Masud-ul-Hasan & Shameel M 2004 Biodiversity of Phormidium Kützing (Cyanophyta) from northern areas of Pakistan in comparison with its seashore. Pak J Mar Sci 13(1&2): 49-62 (Pakistan).

157 Shameel M 2005 Impact of phycochemistry as a branch of phycology. Int J Phycol Phycochem 1(1): 1-4 (Pakistan).

158 Naz S, Masud-ul-Hasan & Shameel M 2005 Taxonomic study of Nostocophyceae (Cyanophyta) from northern areas of Pakistan. Int J Phycol Phycochem 1(1): 13-36 (Pakistan).

159 Shahida B, Zarina A, Masud-ul-Hasan & Shameel M 2005 Taxonomic study of Cyanophyta from Rabwah and Sargodha, Pakistan. Int J Phycol Phycochem 1(1): 43-64 (Pakistan).

160 Ghazala B, Shameel M, Choudhary MI, Shahzad S & Leghari SM 2005 Studies on phycochemistry and bioactivity of some green algae of Sindh. Int J Phycol Phycochem 1(1): 73-82 (Pakistan).

161 Valeem EE & Shameel M 2005 Fatty acid composition of blue-green algae of Sindh, Pakistan. Int J Phycol Phycochem 1(1): 83-92 (Pakistan).

162 Naila B, Ghazala B, Shameel M, Choudhary MI & Leghari SM 2005 Phycochemistry and bioactivity of Aphanothece (Chroocophyceae, Cyanophyta) from Sindh. Int J Phycol Phycochem 1(1): 93-102 (Pakistan).

163 Rizvi MA & Shameel M 2005 Pharmaceutical biology of seaweeds from the Karachi Coast of Pakistan. Pharmaceutical Biology 43(2): 97-107 (USA).

164 Ghazala B & Shameel M 2005 Phycochemistry and bioactivity of some freshwater green algae from Pakistan. Pharmaceutical Biology 43(4): 358-369 (USA).

165 Shahida B, Zarina A, Masud-ul-Hasan & Shameel M 2005 Taxonomic study of some green macroalgae from Rabwah and Sargodha, Pakistan. Int J Phycol Phycochem 1(2): 107-116 (Pakistan).

166 Naila B, Ghazala B, Shameel M, Choudhary MI & Leghari SM 2005 Phycochemistry and bioactivity of Lyngbya (Nostocophyceae Shameel) from Sindh. Int J Phycol Phycochem 1(2): 125-134 (Pakistan).

167 Husna R, Zarina A, Masud-ul-Hasan & Shameel M 2005 Taxonomic study of Cyanophyta from Lahore, Pakistan: I. Class Chroocophyceae Shameel. Int J Phycol Phycochem 1(2): 143-150 (Pakistan).

168 Zarina A, Masud-ul-Hasan & Shameel M 2005 Taxonomic study of Vaucheriophyta Shameel from certain areas of the Punjab and NWFP, Pakistan. Int J Phycol Phycochem 1(2): 159-166 (Pakistan).

169 Tariq-Ali S, Masud-ul-Hasan & Shameel M 2005 Taxonomic study of the genus Phacus Dujardin (Euglenophyta) from Lahore and Sialkot districts of Pakistan. Int J Phycol Phycochem 1(2): 173-176 (Pakistan).

170 Valeem EE & Shameel M 2005 Fatty acid composition of Volvocophyta Shameel from Sindh, Pakistan. Int J Phycol Phycochem 1(2): 177-180 (Pakistan).

171 Shameel M 2005 Beitrag zur Kenntnis der Chara krausei Shameel (Charophyta) (in German). Int J Phycol Phycochem 1(2): 181-186 (Pakistan).

172 Shahnaz L & Shameel M 2005 Phycochemical studies on Oscillatoria sancta (Cyanophyta) from Karachi Coast. Int J Phycol Phycochem 1(2): 193-198 (Pakistan).

173 Zarina A, Masud-ul-Hasan & Shameel M 2005 Taxonomic study of the order Ulotrichales (Chlorophyta) from north-eastern areas of Pakistan. Pak J Bot 37(4): 797-806 (Pakistan).

174 Ghazala B & Shameel M 2005 Phycochemistry and bioactivity of three green algae in comparison with seaweeds of Sindh Coast. Pak J Mar Sci 14(2): 123-131 (Pakistan).

175 Zarina A, Masud-ul-Hasan & Shameel M 2006 Taxonomic study of the class Siphonocladophyceae Shameel from north-eastern areas of Pakistan. Pak J Bot 38(1): 151-159 (Pakistan).

176 Tariq-Ali S, Zarina A, Masud-ul-Hasan & Shameel M 2006 Taxonomic studies on Cymbella (Bacillariophyta) from Punjab and Azad Kashmir. Pak J Bot 38(1): 161-167 (Pakistan).

177 Shahida B, Zarina A, Masud-ul-Hasan & Shameel M 2006 Taxonomic study of some green and red microalgae from Rabwah and Sargodha, Pakistan. Int J Phycol Phycochem 2(1): 7-14 (Pakistan).

178 Tariq-Ali S, Zarina A, Masud-ul-Hasan & Shameel M 2006 Diversity of the genus Euglena Ehrenberg from certain areas of the Punjab, Pakistan. Int J Phycol Phycochem 2(1): 17-32 (Pakistan).

179 Zarina A, Masud-ul-Hasan & Shameel M 2006 Diversity of the genus Oedogonium (Zygnemophyceae Shameel) from north-eastern areas of Pakistan. Int J Phycol Phycochem 2(1): 39-52 (Pakistan).

180 Shahnaz L, Ghazala B & Shameel M 2006 Phycochemistry and bioactivity of Enteromorpha intestinalis (Ulvophyceae, Chlorophyta) from Sindh, Pakistan. Int J Phycol Phycochem 2(1): 59-62 (Pakistan).

181 Hayee-Memon A & Shameel M 2006 Phycochemistry of Solieria robusta (Ceramiophyceae Shameel) from Karachi Coast. Int J Phycol Phycochem 2(1): 71-76 (Pakistan).

182 Valeem EE & Shameel M 2006 Fatty acid composition of the class Ulvophyceae (Chloropyta) from Sindh, Pakistan. Int J Phycol Phycochem 2(1): 87-92 (Pakistan).

183 Shameel M 2006 New concept of the class Zygnemophyceae (Chlorophyta). Int J Phycol Phycochem 2(1): 103-104 (Pakistan).

184 Zarina A, Masud-ul-Hasan & Shameel M 2006 Taxonomic studies of the genus Zygnema from north-eastern areas of Pakistan. Pak J Bot 38(2): 425-433 (Pakistan).

185 Tariq-Ali S, Zarina A, Masud-ul-Hasan & Shameel M 2006 Taxonomic studies of Navicula (Bacillariophyta) from certain areas of the Punjab, Pakistan. Pak J Bot 38(2): 435-441 (Pakistan).

186 Tariq-Ali S, Zarina A, Masud-ul-Hasan & Shameel M 2006 Taxonomic studies on Nitzschia (Bacillariophyta) from Kasur and Lahore districts of Pakistan. Proc Pak Acad Sci 43(3): 151-155 (Pakistan).

187 Zarina A, Masud-ul-Hasan & Shameel M 2006 Occurrence of the genus Chara (Charophyta) in Sheikhupura District of Pakistan. Pak J Bot 38(3): 751-755 (Pakistan).

188 Husna R, Zarina A, Masud-ul-Hasan & Shameel M 2006 Taxonomic study of Cyanophyta from Lahore Pakistan: II Class Nostocophyceae Shameel. Int J Phycol Phycochem 2(2): 117-130 (Pakistan).

189 Aftab J & Shameel M 2006 Phycochemistry and bioactivity of Microcystis aeruginosa (Chroocophyceae Shameel) from Miani Hor, Pakistan. Int J Phycol Phycochem 2(2): 137-148 (Pakistan).

190 Husna R, Zarina A, Masud-ul-Hasan & Shameel M 2006 Taxonomic study of some microalgae from Lahore, Pakistan. Int J Phycol Phycochem 2(2): 157-164 (Pakistan).

191 Shahida B, Zarina A, Masud-ul-Hasan & Shameel M 2006 Taxonomic study of some Volvocophyta Shameel and Bacillariophyta from Rabwah and Sargodha, Pakistan. Int J Phycol Phycochem 2(2): 173-182 (Pakistan).

192 Munir MA, Masud-ul-Hasan & Shameel M 2006 Seasonal variation of some algal genera in a freshwater pond near Lahore and its physico-chemical properties. Int J Phycol Phycochem 2 (2): 197-202 (Pakistan).

193 Valeem EE & Shameel M 2006 Fatty acid composition of the class Zygnemophyceae Shameel (Chlorophyta) from Sindh, Pakistan. Int J Phycol Phycochem 2(2): 207-212 (Pakistan).

194 Rizvi MA & Shameel M 2006 Taxonomic study of various groups of seaweeds for nematicidal activity. Int J Phycol Phycochem 2(2): 217-220 (Pakistan).

195 Shahnaz L & Shameel M 2006 Phycochemistry and bioactivity of some siphonaceous green algae from Karachi Coast. Int J Phycol Phycochem 2(2): 223-228 (Pakistan).

196 Zarina A, Masud-ul-Hasan & Shameel M 2006 Taxonomic study of the class Ulvophyceae (Chlorophyta) from certain areas of the Punjab, Pakistan. Proc Pak Acad Sci 43(4): 229-240 (Pakistan).

197 Rizvi MA & Shameel M 2006 In vitro nematicidal activities of seaweed extracts from Karachi Coast. Pak J Bot 38(4): 1245-1248 (Pakistan).

198 Tariq-Ali S, Zarina A, Masud-ul-Hasan & Shameel M 2006 Diversity of Pinnularia (Bacillariophyta) in the north-eastern areas of Pakistan. Pak J Bot 38(4): 1249-1255 (Pakistan).

199 Shahnaz L & Shameel M 2007 Phycochemistry and bioactivity of some brown algae from Karachi Coast. Int J Phycol Phycochem 3(1): 7-10 (Pakistan).

200 Valeem EE & Shameel M 2007 Fatty acid composition of the class Siphonocladophyceae Shameel (Chlorophyta) from Sindh, Pakistan. Int J Phycol Phycochem 3(1): 17-28 (Pakistan).

201 Gul R, Zarina A, Masud-ul-Hasan & Shameel M 2007 Taxonomic study of Cyanophyta from Sialkot, Pakistan. Int J Phycol Phycochem 3(1): 37-48 (Pakistan).

202 Husna R, Zarina A, Masud-ul-Hasan & Shameel M 2007 Taxonomic study of some diatoms from Lahore, Pakistan. Int J Phycol Phycochem 3(1): 55-64 (Pakistan).

203 Munir MA, Zarina A, Masud-ul-Hasan & Shameel M 2007 Occurrence of the genus Oedogonium (Zygnemophyceae Shameel) in a freshwater pond of Lahore, Pakistan. Int J Phycol Phycochem 3(1): 71-74 (Pakistan).

204 Shahida B, Zarina A, Masud-ul-Hasan & Shameel M 2007 Survey of some freshwater algae from Rabwah and Sargodha cities, Pakistan. Int J Phycol Phycochem 3(1): 83-90 (Pakistan).

205 Shameel M 2007 Check-list of marine plants in Pakistan. Int J Phycol Phycochem 3(1): 97-100 (Pakistan).

206 Zarina A, Masud-ul-Hasan & Shameel M 2007 Occurrence of the genus Bulbochaete (Zygnemophyceae Shameel) from Gujranwala and Lahore districts of Pakistan. Proc Pak Acad Sci 44(2): 105-107 (Pakistan).

207 Shahnaz L & Shameel M 2007 Phycochemistry and bioactivity of Ulva (Chlorophyta) from north Arabian Sea. Int J Phycol Phycochem 3(2): 107-112 (Pakistan).

208 Valeem EE & Shameel M 2007 Fatty acid composition of the phylum Charophyta from Sindh, Pakistan. Int J Phycol Phycochem 3(2): 121-126 (Pakistan).

209 Gul R, Zarina A, Masud-ul-Hasan & Shameel M 2007 Taxonomic study of green macroalgae from Sialkot, Pakistan. Int J Phycol Phycochem 3(2): 135-146 (Pakistan).

210 Aftab J & Shameel M 2007 Phycochemistry and bioactivity of Oscillatoria princeps (Nostocophyceae Shameel) from Miani Hor, Pakistan. Int J Phycol Phycochem 3(2): 159-168 (Pakistan).

211 Husna R, Zarina A, Masud-ul-Hasan & Shameel M 2007 Taxonomic study of Chlorophyta from Lahore, Pakistan. Int J Phycol Phycochem 3(2): 173-182 (Pakistan).

212 Ghazala B, Naila B, Shameel M, Shahzad S & Leghari SM 2007 Phycochemistry and bioactivity of three blue-green algae of Sindh, Pakistan. Int J Phycol Phycochem 3(2): 189-194 (Pakistan).

213 Shahnaz A, Zarina A, Masud-ul-Hasan & Shameel M 2007 Survey of some Volvocophyta Shameel from Lahore, Pakistan. Int J Phycol Phycochem 3(2): 205-212 (Pakistan).

214 Valeem EE & Shameel M 2007 Fatty acid composition of some brown seaweeds (Phaeophyta) from the coast of Karachi. Pak J Mar Sci 16(1): 39-48 (Pakistan).

215 Tariq-Ali S, Zarina A, Masud-ul-Hasan & Shameel M 2007 Occurrence of the family Pinnulariaceae (Bacillariophyta) in various districts of the Punjab, Pakistan. Pak J Bot 39(5): 1797-1805 (Pakistan).

216 Waqar-ul-Haq, Zarina A, Masud-ul-Hasan & Shameel M 2007 Taxonomic study of the family Mesotaeniaceae (Desmidiophyceae Shameel) in certain north-eastern areas of Pakistan. Pak J Bot 39(5): 1807-1815 (Pakistan).

217 Zarina A, Masud-ul-Hasan & Shameel M 2007 Diversity of the genus Spirogyra (Zygnemophyceae Shameel) in the north-eastern areas of Pakistan. Proc Pak Acad Sci 44(4): 225-248 (Pakistan).

218 Valeem EE & Shameel M 2007 Fatty acid composition of more brown seaweeds (Phaeophyta) from the coast of Karachi. Pak J Mar Sci 16(2): 103-108 (Pakistan).

219 Waqar-ul-Haq, Zarina A, Masud-ul-Hasan & Shameel M 2008 Taxonomic study of the family Scendesmaceae (Volvocophyta Shameel) in certain north-eastern areas of Pakistan. Proc Pak Acad Sci 45(1): 23-30.

220 Shahnaz L & Shameel M 2008 Phycochemistry and bioactivity of two coenocytic green seaweeds from Karachi Coast of Pakistan. Int J Phycol Phycochem 4(1): 13-18 (Pakistan).

221 Ghazala B, Naila B, Shameel M & Leghari SM 2008 Phycochemistry and bioactivity of Pithophora oedogonia (Siphonocladophyceae Shameel) from Sindh. Int J Phycol Phycochem 4(1): 31-34 (Pakistan).

222 Aftab J & Shameel M 2008 Phycochemistry and bioactivity of Gloeotrichia raciborskii (Nostocophyceae Shameel) from Miani Hor, Pakistan. Int J Phycol Phycochem 4(1): 39-46 (Pakistan).

223 Gul R, Zarina A, Masud-ul-Hasan & Shameel M 2008 Taxonomic study of some microalgae from Sialkot, Pakistan. Int J Phycol Phycochem 4(1): 57-64 (Pakistan).

224 Valeem EE & Shameel M 2008 Fatty acid composition of some red algae from northern Arabian Sea. Int J Phycol Phycochem 4(1): 71-74 (Pakistan).

225 Shahnaz A, Zarina A, Masud-ul-Hasan & Shameel M 2008 Taxonomic study of Chlorophyta from Lahore, Pakistan. Int J Phycol Phycochem 4(1): 79-90 (Pakistan).

226 Husna R, Zarina A, Masud-ul-Hasan & Shameel M 2008 Taxonomic study of Volvocophyta Shameel from fountain water of Lahore, Pakistan Int J Phycol Phycochem 4(1): 99-110 (Pakistan).

227 Waqar-ul-Haq, Zarina A, Masud-ul-Hasan & Shameel M 2008 Taxonomic study of the family Hydrodictyaceae (Volvocophyceae Shameel) from north-eastern areas of Pakistan. Int J Phycol Phycochem 4(1): 117-120 (Pakistan).

228 Waqar-ul-Haq, Zarina A, Masud-ul-Hasan & Shameel M 2008 Taxonomic study on Volvocophyceae Shameel from certain areas of the Punjab. Pak J Bot 40(2): 833-840 (Pakistan).

229 Tariq-Ali S, Masud-ul-Hasan & Shameel M 2008 Occurrence of pennate diatoms (Bacillariophyta) in the Punjab and N.W.F.P., Pakistan. Pak J Bot 40(2): 841-847 (Pakistan).

230 Tariq-Ali S, Zarina A, Masud-ul-Hasan & Shameel M 2008 Taxonomic study of certain diatoms from freshwater habitats of north-eastern areas of Pakistan. Proc Pak Acad Sci 45(3): 117-123 (Pakistan).

231 Tariq-Ali S, Masud-ul-Hasan & Shameel M 2008 Occurrence of the families Naviculaceae and Surirellaceae (Bacillariophyta) in the Punjab and N.W.F.P., Pakistan. Pak J Bot 40(5): 2143-2148 (Pakistan).

232 Tariq-Ali S, Masud-ul-Hasan & Shameel M 2008 Occurrence of the families Fragilariaceae and Gomphonemataceae (Bacillariales) in the north-eastern areas of Pakistan. Int J Phycol Phycochem 4(2): 133-136 (Pakistan).

233 Valeem EE and Shameel M 2008 Fatty acid composition of the class Ceramiophyceae (Rhodophyta) from northern Arabian Sea. Int J Phycol Phycochem 4(2): 141-148 (Pakistan).

234 Shahnaz L and Shameel M 2008 Bioactivity and phycochemical investigation on three red algae from Karachi Coast. Int J Phycol Phycochem 4(2): 159-164 (Pakistan).

235 Aftab J and Shameel M 2008 Phycochemistry and bioactivity of Microspora floccosa (Ulvophyceae) from Miani Hor, Pakistan. Int J Phycol Phycochem 4(2): 171-178 (Pakistan).

236 Shahnaz A, Zarina A, Masud-ul-Hasan and Shameel M 2008 Taxonomic study of Chroocophyceae Shameel from Lahore, Pakistan. Int J Phycol Phycochem 4(2): 185-190 (Pakistan).

237 Gul R, Zarina A, Masud-ul-Hasan and Shameel M 2008 Taxonomic studies on the class Desmidiophyceae Shameel from Sialkot District of Pakistan. Int J Phycol Phycochem 4(2): 197-204 (Pakistan).

238 Ghazala B and Shameel M 2008 A new species of silicoflagellates (Chrysophyta) from the coastal water of Sind, Pakistan. Int J Phycol Phycochem 4(2): 209-220 (Pakistan).

239 Rizvi MA & Shameel M 2008 Elemental composition in various thallus parts of three green seaweeds from Karachi Coast. Int J Phycol Phycochem 4(2): 221-224 (Pakistan).

240 Shameel M 2008 Change of divisional nomenclature in the Shameelian Classification of algae. Int J Phycol Phycochem 4(2): 225-232 (Pakistan).

241 Zarina A, Masud-ul-Hasan & Shameel M 2008 Taxonomic studies of the class Zygnemophyceae Shameel from north-eastern areas of Pakistan. Pak J Bot 40(6): 2561-2566 (Pakistan).

242 Abbas A & Shameel M 2008 Anatomical studies on Stoechospermum marginatum (Phaeophyta) from the coast of Pakistan. Pak J Bot 40(6): 2567-2572 (Pakistan).

243 Zarina A, Masud-ul-Hasan & Shameel M 2008 Taxonomic studies on the genus Zygnemopsis (Zygnemophyceae Shameel) from north-eastern areas of Pakistan. Proc Pak Acad Sci 45(4): 165-169 (Pakistan).

244 Valeem EE & Shameel M 2008 Fatty acid composition in the different phyla of algae from Sindh, Pakistan. Pak J Mar Sci 17(2): 81-92 (Pakistan).

245 Aftab J & Shameel M 2008 Phycochemistry and bioactivity of Lyngbya (Nostocophyceae, Cyanophya) from Miani Hor, Pakistan. Pak J Mar Sci 17(2): 107-121 (Pakistan).

246 Valeem EE & Shameel M 2008 Fatty acid composition in algae of different thallus organizations. Pak J Mar Sci 17(Sp Iss): 169-174 (Pakistan).

247 Zarina A, Masud-ul-Hasan & Shameel M 2009 Diversity of freshwater green macroalgae in the Punjab and neighbouring areas of Pakistan. Pak J Bot 41(1): 277-291 (Pakistan).

248 Aliya R, Zarina A & Shameel M 2009 Survey of freshwater algae from Karachi, Pakistan. Pak J Bot 41(2): 861-870 (Pakistan).

249 Naz S, Zarina A, Masud-ul-Hasan & Shameel M 2009 Diversity of Cyanophycota in the north-eastern areas of Pakistan. Proc Pak Acad Sci 46(1): 29-40 (Pakistan).

250 Ghazala B, Naila B & Shameel M 2009 Phycochemistry and bioactivity of ten freshwater algae from Pakistan. Int J Algae 11(1): 84-98 (USA).

251 Waqar-ul-Haq, Zarina A & Shameel M 2009 Taxonomic study of the genus Closterium (class Desmidophyceae Shameel) from north-eastern areas of Pakistan. Proc Pak Acad Sci 46(2): 57-67 (Pakistan).

252 Afaq-Husain S, Zarina A & Shameel M 2009 Phycochemical studies on Helminthocladia nizamuddinii (Nemalales, Rhodophycota). Int J Phycol Phycochem 5(1): 11-16 (Pakistan).

253 Shaikh W, Zarina A & Shameel M 2009 Fatty acid composition of Dictyopteris australis (Phaeophycota) from the coast of Karachi. Int J Phycol Phycochem 5(1): 21-24 (Pakistan).

254 Hayee-Memon A, Zarina A & Shameel M 2009 Phycochemical studies on Bangia atropurpurea (Rhodophycota) from the coast of Karachi. Int J Phycol Phycochem 5(1): 35-40 (Pakistan).

255 Shahnaz A, Zarina A, Masud-ul-Hasan & Shameel M 2009 Taxonomic study of the family Nostocaceae (Cyanophycota) from Lahore, Pakistan. Int J Phycol Phycochem 5(1): 49-54 (Pakistan).

256 Aftab J & Shameel M 2009 Studies on the phycochemistry and bioactivity of Spirogyra (Zygnemophyceae Shameel) from Miani Hor, Pakistan. Int J Phycol Phycochem 5(1): 57-66 (Pakistan).

257 Valeem EE & Shameel M 2009 Fatty acid composition in different types of green algae from Sindh, Pakistan. Int J Phycol Phycochem 5(1): 71-76 (Pakistan).

258 Ghazala B, Hena L, Zarina A & Shameel M 2009 Taxonomic survey of freshwater algae at the campus of BZ University of Multan, Pakistan. Int J Phycol Phycochem 5(1): 77-92 (Pakistan).

259 Shameel M 2009 Studies on barobiology of marine algae. Int J Phycol Phycochem 5(1): 99-108 (Pakistan).

260 Aisha K & Shameel M 2009 Occurrence of the genus Bachelotia (Ectocarpales, Phaeophycota) in the coastal waters of Pakistan. Pak J Bot 41(4): 1917-1920 (Pakistan).

261 Abbas A & Shameel M 2009 Anatomical studies on Colpomenia sinuosa (Phaeophycota) from Karachi Coast of Pakistan. Pak J Bot 41(4): 1921-1926 (Pakistan).

262 Valeem EE & Shameel M 2009 Influence of aquatic environment on the composition of fatty acids in algae growing in Sindh, Pakistan. Proc Pak Acad Sci 46(3): 109-116 (Pakistan).

263 Tariq-Ali S, Masud-ul-Hasan & Shameel M 2009 Diversity of Euglenophycota and Bacillarophycota in the north-eastern areas of Pakistan. Proc Pak Acad Sci 46(3): 117-130 (Pakistan).

264 Tariq-Ali S, Masud-ul-Hasan & Shameel M 2009 Diversity of the genera of pinnate diatoms in the Punjab. Pak J Bot 41(5): 2551-2561 (Pakistan).

265 Hayee-Memon A, Shameel M & Zarina A 2009 Fatty acid composition of Calliblepharis fimbriata (Grev.) Kütz. (Rhodophycota) from the coast of Karachi. Int J Algae 11(4): 373-376 (USA).

266 Shahnaz L & Shameel M 2009 Chemical composition and bioactivity of some benthic algae from Karachi coast of Pakistan. Int J Algae 11(4): 377-393 (USA).

267 Afaq-Husain S, Shameel M & Zarina A 2009 Phycochemical examination of Gelidium usmanghanii (Gelidales, Rhodophycota). Int J Phycol Phycochem 5(2): 121-126 (Pakistan).

268 Shaikh W, Shameel M & Zarina 2009 Phycochemical studies on Jolyna laminarioides (Scytosiphonales) Phaeophycota. Int J Phycol Phycochem 5(2): 135-142 (Pakistan).

269 Hayee-Memon A, Shameel M & Zarina A 2009 Phycochemistry of Sarconema filiforme (Gigartinales, Rhodophycota). Int J Phycol Phycochem 5(2): 149-154 (Pakistan).

270 Shahnaz A, Zarina A, Masud-ul-Hasan & Shameel M 2009 Taxonomic study of the families Oscillatoraceae and Rivularaceae (Cyanophycota) from Lahore, Pakistan. Int J Phycol Phycochem 5(2): 167-176 (Pakistan).

271 Tariq-Ali S, Masud-ul-Hasan & Shameel M 2009 Diversity of Euglenophycota in the Punjab, Pakistan. Int J Phycol Phycochem 5(2): 183-190 (Pakistan).

272 Masud-ul-Hasan, Zarina A, Niazi IUK & Shameel M 2009 Taxonomic study on Chlorophycota from Daud Khel, Pakistan. Int J Phycol Phycochem 5(2): 199-210 (Pakistan).

273 Valeem EE & Shameel M 2009 Variations in the fatty acid composition of algae having different thallus structures from Sindh. Int J Phycol Phycochem 5(2): 211-216 (Pakistan).

274 Abbas A & Shameel M 2010 Studies on the anatomy of a controversial brown alga, Cystoseira indica. Proc Pak Acad Sci 47(1): 11-17 (Pakistan).

275 Ghazala B, Naila B & Shameel M 2010 Fatty acids and biological activities of crude extracts of freshwater algae from Sindh. Pak J Bot 42(2): 1201-1212.

276 Abbas A & Shameel M 2010 Anatomical studies on a new brown alga, Nizamuddinia zanardinii (Schiff.) P. Silva. Int J Algae 12(2): 159-168 (USA).

277 Zarina A, Naz S & Shameel M 2010 Distribution of freshwater blue-green algae (Cyanophycota) in northeastern Pakistan. Int J Algae 12(3): 257-270 (USA).

278 Khalid MN, Shameel M, Ahmad VU, Shahzad S & Leghari SM 2010 Bioactivity and phycochemistry of Gloeotrichia raciborskii (Cyanophycota) from Sindh. Int J Phycol Phycochem 6(1): 5-12 (Pakistan).

279 Hayee-Memon A, Shameel M & Zarina A 2010 Fatty acid composition of Scinaia hatei (Bonnemaisonales, Rhodophycota). Int J Phycol Phycochem 6(1): 17-20 (Pakistan).

280 Shaikh W, Shameel M & Zarina A 2010 Fatty acid composition of Sargassum tenerrimum (Fucales, Phaeophycota). Int J Phycol Phycochem 6(1): 29-32 (Pakistan).

281 Shahnaz A, Zarina A, Masud-ul-Hasan & Shameel M 2010 Taxonomic study of the diatoms (Bacillarophycota Shameel) from Lahore, Pakistan. Int J Phycol Phycochem 6(1): 41-50 (Pakistan).

282 Masud-ul-Hasan, Zarina A, Niazi IUK & Shameel M 2010 Taxonomic study on Cyanophycota from Mianwali District, Pakistan. Int J Phycol Phycochem 6(1): 59-68 (Pakistan).

283 Aisha K & Shameel M 2010 Taxonomic study of the genus Ectocarpus Lyngb. (Phaeophycota) from the coastal waters of Karachi (Pakistan). Int J Algae 12(3): 271-281 (USA).

284 Khalid MN, Shameel M, Ahmad VU, Shahzad S & Leghari SM 2010 Studies on the bioactivity and phycochemistry of Microcystis aeruginosa (Cyanophycota) from Sindh. Pak J Bot 42(4): 2635-2646 (Pakistan).

285 Abbas A & Shameel M 2010 Anatomical studies on Iyengaria Børgesen (Phaeophycota) from Karachi Coast of Pakistan. Proc Pak Acad Sci 47(3): 143-153 (Pakistan).

286 Abbas A & Shameel M 2010 Anatomical studies on Lobophora variegata (Phaeophycota) from the coast of Pakistan. Pak J Bot 42(6): 4169-4176 (Pakistan).

287 Rizvi MA & Shameel M 2010 Elemental composition in various thallus parts of three brown seaweeds from Karachi Coast. Pak J Bot 42(6): 4177-4181 (Pakistan).

288 Tariq-Ali S, Zarina A & Shameel M 2010 Seasonal variation and distribution of Euglenophycota in the Punjab. Pak J Bot 42(6): 4371-4378 (Pakistan).

289 Aisha K & Shameel M 2010 Occurrence of the genus Padina (Dictyophyceae, Phaeophycota) in the coastal waters of Karachi. Pak J Bot 42(Sp Iss S. I. Ali Festschrift): 319-340 (Pakistan).

290 Khalid MN, Shameel M, Ahmad VU & Leghari SM 2010 Studies on the bioactivity and phycochemistry of Oscillatoria princeps (Cyanophycota) from Sindh. Int J Phycol Phycochem 6(2): 73-80 (Pakistan).

291 Masud-ul-Hasan, Zarina A & Shameel M 2010 Taxonomic study of the class Desmidophyceae Shameel from Mianwali District, Pakistan. Int J Phycol Phycochem 6(2): 89-100 (Pakistan).

292 Waqar-ul-Haq, Zarina A, Masud-ul-Hasan & Shameel M 2010 Taxonomic study on ten species of Cosmarium corda (Desmidophyceae Shameel) from north-eastern areas of Pakistan. Int J Phycol Phycochem 6(2): 107-114 (Pakistan).

293 Shahnaz A, Zarina A, Masud-ul-Hasan & Shameel M 2010 Survey of freshwater algae from Lahore, Pakistan. Int J Phycol Phycochem 6(2): 123-130 (Pakistan).

294 Masud-ul-Hasan, Zarina A & Shameel M 2010 Microtaxonomical studies on Chlorophycota and Vaucherophycota from Jauharabad District, Pakistan. Int J Phycol Phycochem 6(2): 141-154 (Pakistan).

295 Valeem EE & Shameel M 2010 Distribution of palmitic acid in different phyla of algae. Int J Phycol Phycochem 6(2): 159-166 (Pakistan).

296 Khalid MN, Shameel M, Ghazala B & Ahmad VU 2010 The bioactivity and phycochemistry of two stonewort algae (Charophycota) from Sindh. Proc Pak Acad Sci 47(4): 205-214 (Pakistan).

297 Naz S, Zarina A & Shameel M 2011 Diversity of freshwater Cyanophyta in the north-eastern areas of Pakistan. Int J Algae 13(1): 73-87 (USA).

298 Aisha K & Shameel M 2011 Taxonomic study of the order Ectocarpales (Phaeophycota) from the coastal waters of Pakistan. Int J Algae 13(2): 128-148 (USA).

299 Khalid MN & Shameel M 2011 Studies on the bioactivity and phycochemistry of Lyngbya (Cyanophycota). Int J Algae 13(3): 234-249 (USA).

300 Abbas A & Shameel M 2011 Anatomical studies on Jolyna laminarioides (Phaeophycota). Int J Algae 13(3): 268-276 (USA).

301 Abbas A & Shameel M 2011 Identification of a new brown alga, Spatoglossum qaiserabbasii, from the Karachi Coast of north Arabian Sea. Proc Pak Acad Sci 48(1): 33-38 (Pakistan).

302 Abbas A & Shameel M 2011 Anatomy of Dictyopteris divaricata (Phaeophycota) from the coast of Karachi. Pak J Bot 43(4): 2207-2210 (Pakistan).

303 Khalid MN, Shameel M & Ahmad VU 2011 Bioactivity and phycochemical studies on Microspora floccosa (Chlorophycota) from Sindh. Pak J Bot 43(5): 2557-2560 (Pakistan).

304 Shameel M, Afaq-Husain S & Zarina A 2011 Phycochemical investigations on three species of the genus Scinaia Bivona-Bernardi (Nemaliales, Rhodophycota) from the coast of Karachi (Pakistan). Int J Algae 13(4): 363-378 (USA).

305 Masud-ul-Hasan, Zarina A, Waqar-ul-Haq & Shameel M 2011 Taxonomic study of some freshwater green microalgae along Shahdara and Gujranwala. Int J Phycol Phycochem 7(1): 3-8 (Pakistan).

306 Zarina A, Waqar-ul-Haq, Masud-ul-Hasan & Shameel M 2011 Microtaxonomical study of the family nostocaceae from Jauharabad, Pakistan. Int J Phycol Phycochem 7(1): 23-28 (Pakistan).

307 Valeem EE & Shameel M 2011 Distribution of oleic acid in different algal phyla of Pakistan. Int J Phycol Phycochem 7(1): 61-68 (Pakistan).

308 Valeem EE, Rizvi MA & Shameel M 2011 Bioactivity, elementology and fatty acid composition of Ulva fasciata Delile from a rocky ledge of Buleji, Pakistan. Int J Phycol Phycochem 7(1): 81-90 (Pakistan).

309 Zarina A. Tariq-Ali S, Masud-ul-Hasan & Shameel M 2011 Taxonomic study of some euglenoid algae along G. T. Road between Shahdara and Gujranwala. Pak J Bot 43(6): 3057-3060 (Pakistan).

310 Abbas A. & Shameel M 2011 Morphological studies on Dictyopteris tripolitana (Phaeophycota) from the coast of Karachi. FUUAST J Biol 1(1): 53-56 (Pakistan).

311 Abbas A. & Shameel M 2011 Morpho-anatomical studies on two peculiar brown algae from Karachi coast of Pakistan. Proceed Pak Acad Sci 48(4): 221-232 (Pakistan).

312 Valeem EE & Shameel M 2011. Distribution of Stearic acid in different algal phyla of Pakistan. Int J Phycol Phycochem 7(2): 131-138 (Pakistan).

313 Zarina A, Masud-ul-Hasan & Shameel M 2011 Taxonomical study of the order Volvocales from Mianwali District, Pakistan. Int J Phycol Phycochem 7(2): 139-146 (Pakistan).

314 Rizvi MA, Valeem EE & Shameel M 2011 Bioactivity, elementology and fatty acid composition of Jolyna laminarioides Guimarâes from a rocky ledge of Karachi, Pakistan. Int J Phycol Phycochem 7(2): 171-176 (Pakistan).

315 Shameel M 2011 Occurrence of Caulerpa (Siphonocladophyceae) at the coast of Pakistan. Int J Phycol Phycochem 7(2): 153-162 (Pakistan).

316 Aisha K & Shameel M 2012 Occurrence of the genus Lobophora (Phaeophycota) in the coastal waters of Karachi. Pak J Bot 44(2): 837-840 (Pakistan).

317 Khalid MN & Shameel M 2012 Phycochemistry and bioactivity of twelve freshwater algae of Pakistan. Int J Algae 14(2): 163-184 (USA).

318 Khalid MN, Shameel M & Ghazala B 2012 Bioactivity and phycochemistry of two species of Spirogyra (Zygnemophyceae) from Pakistan. Int J Algae 14(3): 237-246 (USA).

319 Aisha K & Shameel M 2012 Taxonomy of the genus Spacelaria Lyngb. (Pheaeophycota) from the coast of Pakistan. Int J Algae 14(3): 247-264 (USA).

320 Tariq-Ali S, Zarina A & Shameel M 2012 Distribution pattern of pinnate diatoms in the north-eastern areas of Pakistan. Int J Algae 14(3): 265-278 (USA).

321 Abbas A & Shameel M 2012 Anatomical studies on Padina boergesenii (Pheaeophycota) from the coast of Karachi, Pakistan. Int J Algae 14(3): 287-293 (USA).

B Book Publications:

1 Rizvi MA & Shameel M 2010 Econo-Medicinal Seaweeds of Pakistan: Econo-Medicinal Importance, Chemical Constituents, Bioactivity. VDM Verlag Dr. Müller Saarbrücken Germany 336 pp.

2 Valeem EE & Shameel M 2010 Composition of Fatty Acids in Marine and Freshwater Algae of Sindh: Isolation and Characterization. VDM Verlag Dr. Müller Saarbrücken Germany 240 pp.

3 Aftab J & Shameel M 2010 Phycochemistry and Bioactivity of Some Algae from Miani Hor, Balochistan: Estuarine Algae, Isolation and Characterization.. VDM Verlag Dr. Müller Saarbrücken Germany 236 pp.

4 Abbas A & Shameel M 2012. Morpho-Anatomy of the Phaeophycota from Karachi Coast: Brown Algae, Morphology, Anatomy, Reproduction and Distribution. LAP Lambert Acad Saarbrücken Germany Publ 220 pp.

5 Zarina A & Shameel M 2012. Taxonomy of Green Algae from North-Eastern Areas of Pakistan-I: Freshwater Algae (Chlorophycota and Vaucheriophycota), Morphology, Cytology, Reproduction and Reproduction. LAP Lambert Acad Saarbrücken Germany Publ 244 pp.

6 Waqar-ul-Haq, Zarina A & Shameel M 2012. Taxonomy of Green Algae from North-Eastern Areas of Pakistan-II: Freshwater Microalgae (Volvophycota), Morphology, Cytology, Reproduction and Distribution. LAP Lambert Acad Saarbrücken Germany Publ 236 pp.

7 Shahnaz L & Shameel M 2012. Phycochemistry and Bioactivity of Different Seaweeds from Karachi: Marine Benthic Algae, Fatty Acid Composition, Steroles, Antimicrobial, Cytotoxic & Phytotoxix Activities. LAP Lambert Acad Saarbrücken Germany Publ pp.

C Miscellaneous Publications:

1995 – 2001: 20 Popular scientific articles published in different journals, magazines & newspapers.

2004 – 2009: 23 Urdu poems for children published in the monthly “Taleem-o-Tarbiat” Lahore.

=== Selected publications ===
- Shameel, Mustafa; Nizamuddin, Mohammed (1972). "Morphology and development of a new alga, Haloplegma anwerii (Ceramiaceae) from Karachi coast". Nova Hedwigia. 23 (2–3): 433–444.
- Ahmad, Viqar Uddin; Aliya, Rahman; Perveen, Shaista; Shameel, Mustafa (1993). "Sterols from marine green alga Codium decorticatum". Phytochemistry. 33 (5): 1189–1192. Bibcode:1993PChem..33.1189A. doi:10.1016/0031-9422(93)85047-U.
- Aisha, Khan; Shameel, Mustafa (2011). "Taxonomic Study of the Order Ectocarpales (Phaeophycota) from the Coastal Waters of Pakistan". International Journal on Algae. 13 (2): 128–148. doi:10.1615/INTERJALGAE.V13.I2.40.
