= Cueva del Fantasma =

Coordinates: 5°27′21″N 62°27′41″W

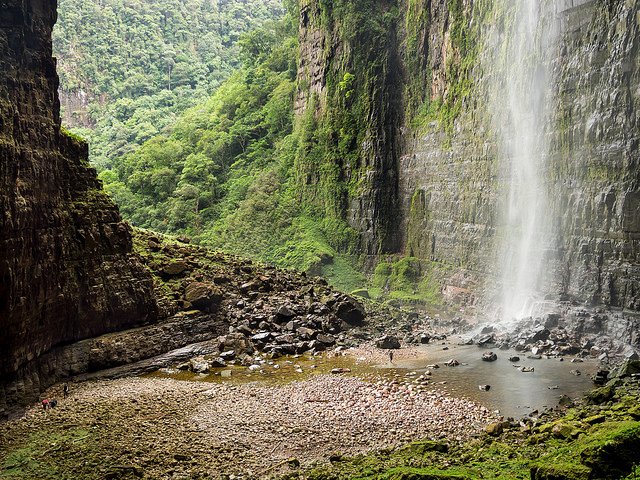
Interior of Cueva de El Fantasma

Cueva de El Fantasma (in Spanish, "Cave of The Phantom" after the comic book character) is a giant cave in southern Venezuela, located in one of the most biologically rich, geologically ancient parts of the world, along the slopes of Aprada-tepui. Large enough for two helicopters to land in the cave, the report from Zootaxa is said to be the first photographic evidence of such an immense cave. However, experts note, it is not technically a cave, but rather a collapsed, steep gorge.
