= Davidsonia (journal) =

- Discipline: Horticulture
- Language: English
- Edited by: Iain Taylor

Publication details
- History: 1971-1980, 2002-present
- Publisher: UBC Botanical Garden and Centre for Plant Research (Canada)
- Frequency: Quarterly
- Open access: Yes

Standard abbreviations
- ISO 4: Davidsonia

Indexing
- ISSN: 0045-9739
- OCLC no.: 488567184

Links
- Journal homepage

Davidsonia is a scientific journal of botanical garden science published by the University of British Columbia Botanical Garden. It specializes in the botanical natural history of the Pacific North West and horticultural and plant conservation issues. It is named after John Davidson, a botanical pioneer in British Columbia, and has no connection to the plant genus Davidsonia named after the unrelated botanist, J. E. Davidson. The editor-in-chief is Iain Taylor.

== Publication history ==
The print edition of Davidsonia existed from 1970 to 1981. The journal was revived in 2002 as an open access online journal.
