= Mount Davidson (British Columbia) =

Mountain in the country of Canada

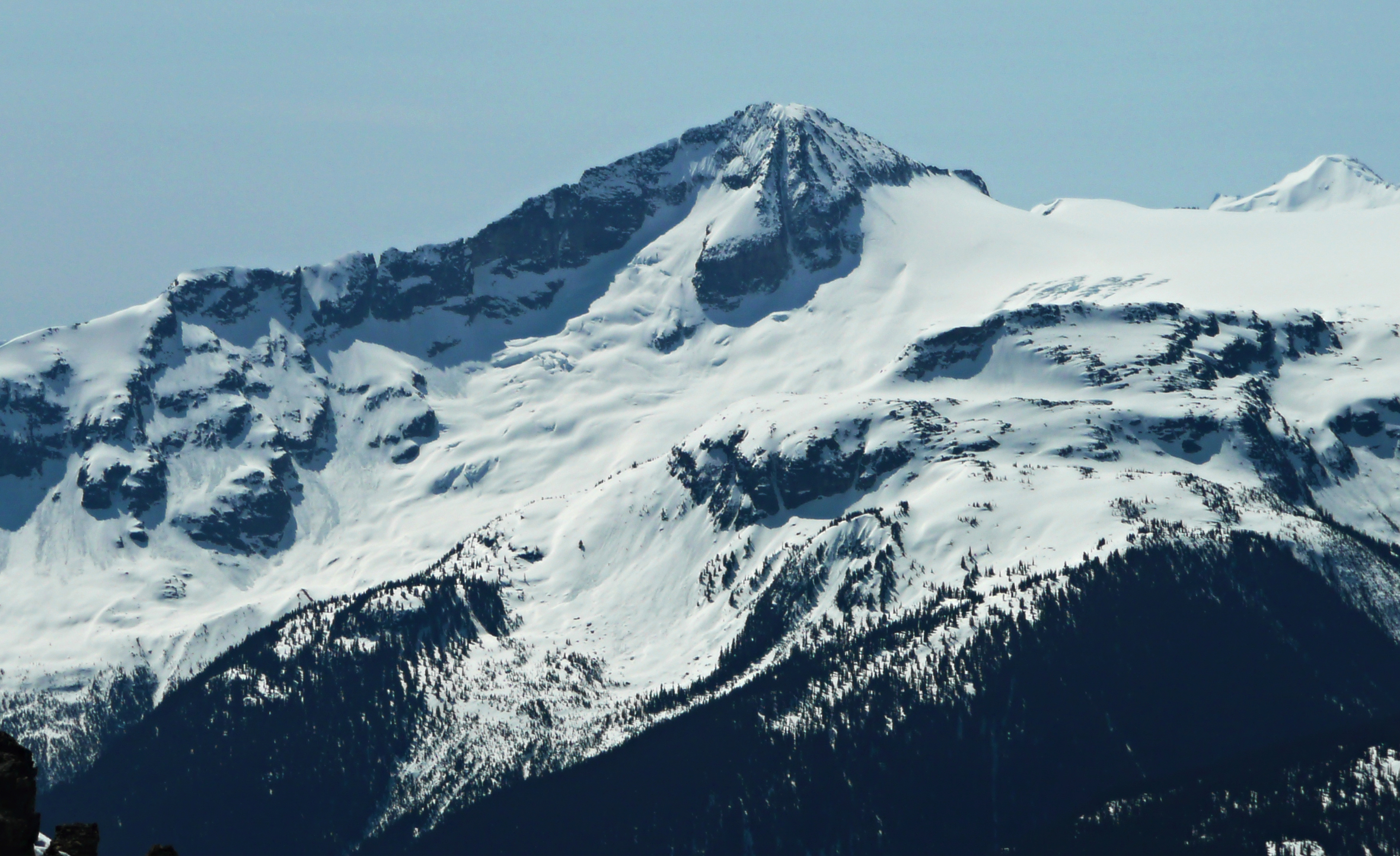
- Mount Davidson seen from Whistler Blackcomb

Highest point
- Elevation: 2,516 m (8,255 ft)
- Prominence: 236 m (774 ft)
- Parent peak: Castle Towers Mountain (2676 m)
- Listing: Mountains of British Columbia
- Coordinates: 49°56′52″N 122°54′15″W

Naming
- Etymology: John Davidson

Geography
- Location within British Columbia Location within Canada
- Interactive map of Mount Davidson
- Country: Canada
- Province: British Columbia
- District: New Westminster Land District
- Protected area: Garibaldi Provincial Park
- Parent range: Garibaldi Ranges; Coast Ranges
- Topo map: NTS 92G15 Mamquam Mountain

Climbing
- First ascent: 1925 by N. Carter, E. Milledge
- Easiest route: class 4 via Southwest Ridge

Mount Davidson is a 2,516-metre (8,255-foot) mountain summit located in the Garibaldi Ranges of the Coast Mountains, in Garibaldi Provincial Park of southwestern British Columbia, Canada. Visible from the Whistler Blackcomb ski area, it is situated 18 km (11 mi) south of Whistler, and its nearest higher peak is Castle Towers Mountain, 3 km (2 mi) to the west. The Cheakamus Glacier lies between these two summits, and precipitation runoff from the peak and meltwater from the glacier drains into tributaries of the Cheakamus River. The first ascent of the mountain was made in 1929 by Neal M. Carter and Emmy Milledge. The mountain is named after Professor John Davidson (1878 – 1970), who contributed a large amount of botanical knowledge about Garibaldi Park. The mountain's toponym was officially adopted on September 2, 1930, by the Geographical Names Board of Canada.

== Climate ==
Based on the Köppen climate classification, Mount Davidson is located in the marine west coast climate zone of western North America. Most weather fronts originate in the Pacific Ocean, and travel east toward the Coast Mountains where they are forced upward by the range (Orographic lift), causing them to drop their moisture in the form of rain or snowfall. As a result, the Coast Mountains experience high precipitation, especially during the winter months in the form of snowfall. Temperatures can drop below −20 °C with wind chill factors below −30 °C. The months July through September offer the most favorable weather for climbing Mount Davidson.

== Gallery ==
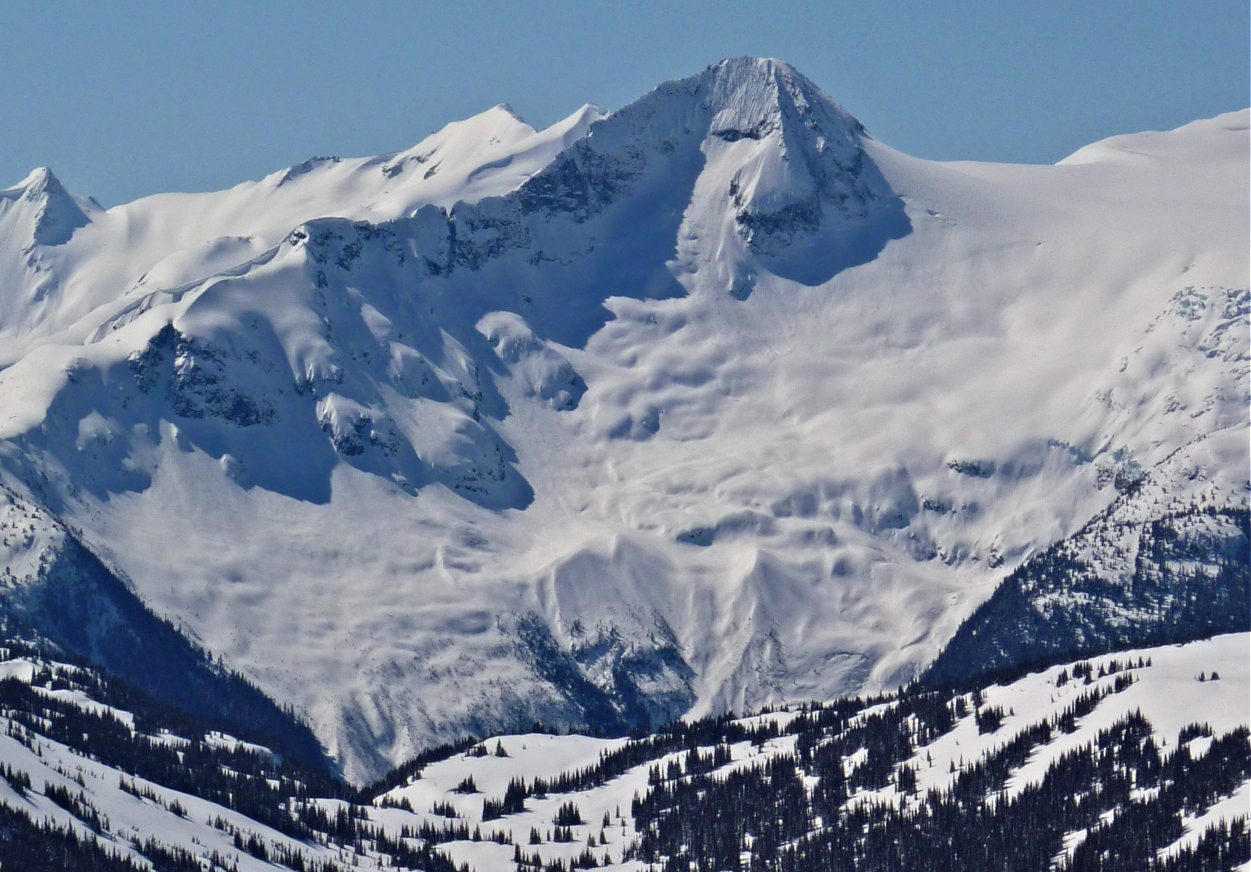
Mount Davidson in spring

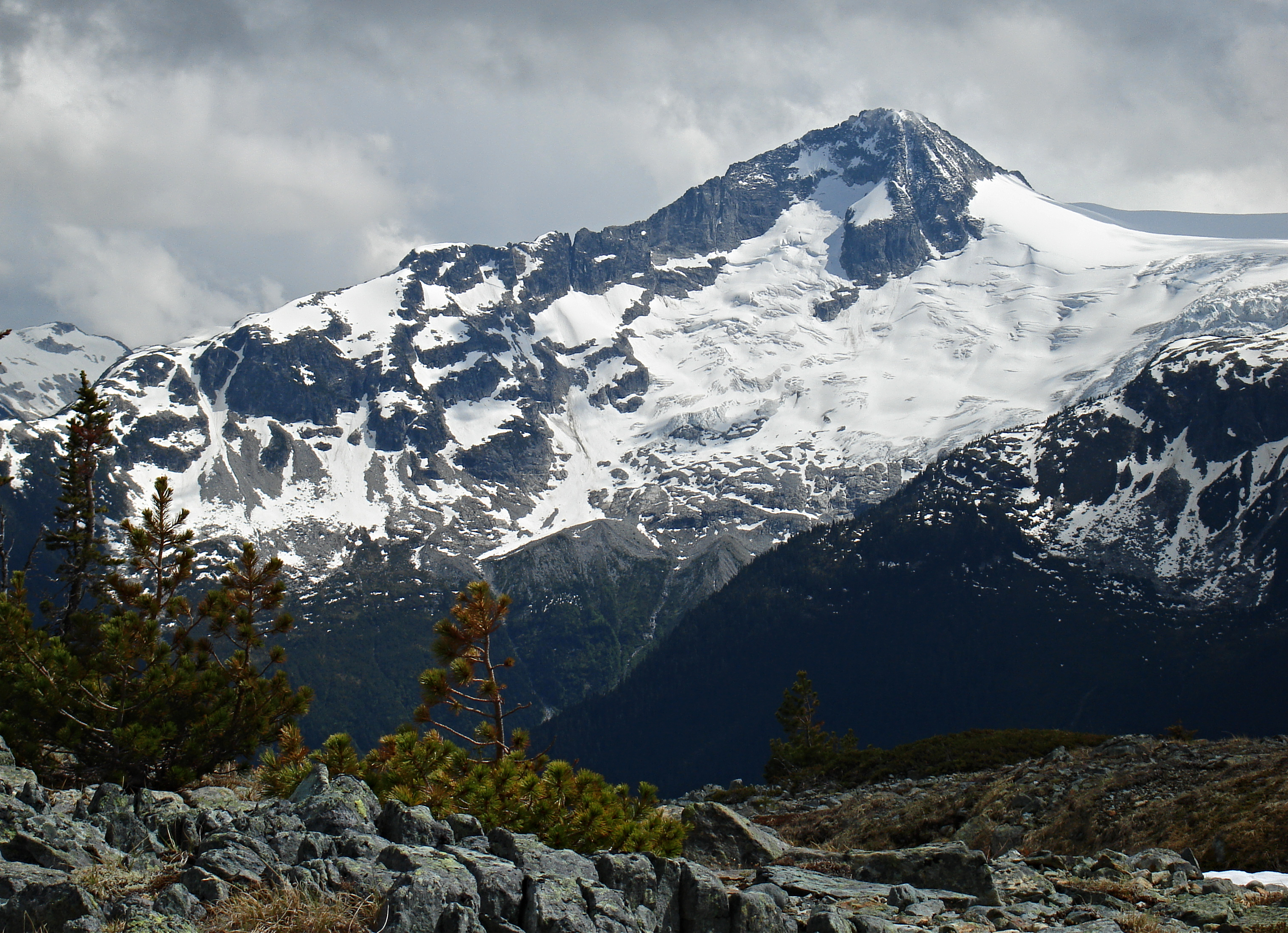
Mount Davidson from Singing Pass area

== See also ==
- Geography of British Columbia
- Geology of British Columbia
