= Edinburgh Journal of Botany =

Academic journal

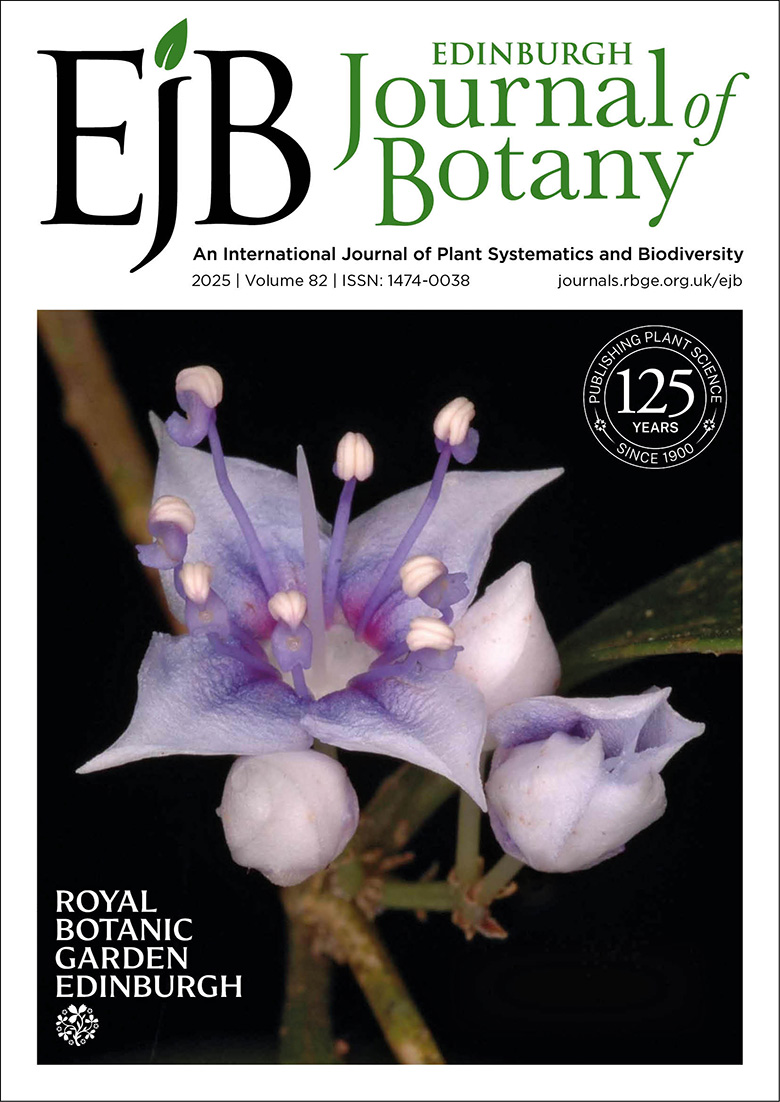
- Discipline: Botany
- Language: English
- Edited by: Peter Wilkie

Publication details
- Former names: Notes from the Royal Botanic Garden, Edinburgh
- History: 1900
- Publisher: Royal Botanic Garden Edinburgh (Scotland)
- Frequency: Annual
- Open access: Yes
- License: Creative Commons Attribution 4.0 International License

Standard abbreviations
- ISO 4: Edinb. J. Bot.

Indexing
- ISSN: 0960-4286 (print); 1474-0036 (web)
- LCCN: 90648365
- OCLC no.: 21684344

Links
- Journal homepage

Edinburgh Journal of Botany is an annual peer-reviewed scientific journal published by the Royal Botanic Garden Edinburgh. The scope of the journal is plant systematics and related subjects, including biodiversity, conservation science and phytogeography.

The journal adopted a diamond open access mode of publishing, using the Creative Commons Attribution License for published works since volume 78 (2021).

== Publication history ==
For most of its history, the journal was published by Her Majesty's Stationery Office (HMSO), until 1995 when it changed to Cambridge University Press. Then in 2021 it changed again to the Royal Botanic Gardens Edinburgh in conjunction with the University of Edinburgh’s journal-hosting service.

Notable editors-in-chief of the journal over the years have included: Isaac Bayley Balfour, William Wright Smith, B.L. Burtt, Ian Charleson Hedge, James Alexander Ratter, Brian John Coppins, John Albert Raven, and Mark Fleming Newman.

== Abstracting and indexing ==
The journal is abstracted and indexed in:

- AGRICOLA
- Biological Abstracts
- BIOSIS Previews
- EBSCO's Garden, Landscape and Horticulture Index
- EBSCO's STM Source
- OpenAlex
- Scopus

== See also ==
- Kew Bulletin
- Annals of the Missouri Botanical Garden
- Davidsonia
