= Zootaxa =

Peer-reviewed scientific mega journal

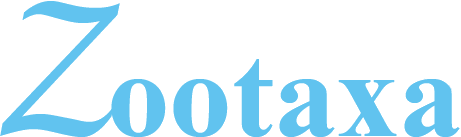
- Discipline: Taxonomy; Zoology
- Language: English
- Edited by: Zhi-Qiang Zhang

Publication details
- History: 2001–present
- Publisher: Magnolia Press (New Zealand)
- Frequency: Upon acceptance
- Open access: Hybrid
- Impact factor: 1.091 (2020)

Standard abbreviations
- ISO 4: Zootaxa

Indexing
- ISSN: 1175-5326 (print); 1175-5334 (web)
- OCLC no.: 49030618

Links
- Journal homepage; Online access

Zootaxa is a peer-reviewed scientific mega journal for animal taxonomists. It is published by Magnolia Press (Auckland, New Zealand). The journal was established by Zhi-Qiang Zhang in 2001 and new issues are published multiple times a week. From 2001 to 2020, more than 60,000 new species have been described in the journal accounting for around 25% of all new taxa indexed in The Zoological Record in the last few years. Print and online versions are available.

== Temporary suspension from JCR ==
The journal exhibited high levels of self-citation and its journal impact factor of 2019 was suspended from Journal Citation Reports in 2020, a sanction which hit 34 journals in total. Biologist Ross Mounce noted that high levels of self-citation may be inevitable for a journal which publishes a large share of new species classification. Later that year, this decision was reversed and it was admitted that levels of self-citation are appropriate considering the large proportion of papers from its field published by Zootaxa.

== See also ==
- Phytotaxa, a botanical journal also published by Magnolia Press
- ZooKeys, a fully open access zoological journal
