= Agronomy for Sustainable Development =

- Discipline: Agronomy
- Language: English
- Edited by: Sylvie Recous, Jacques Le Bot, Jean-Marc Meynard

Publication details
- Former name(s): Agronomie
- History: 1981–present
- Publisher: Springer Science+Business Media, on behalf of the French National Research Institute for Agriculture, Food and the Environment (France)
- Frequency: Bimonthly
- Open access: Hybrid
- Impact factor: 5.832 (2020)

Standard abbreviations
- ISO 4: Agron. Sustain. Dev.

Indexing
- ISSN: 1774-0746 (print); 1773-0155 (web)
- OCLC no.: 803413804

Links
- Journal homepage; Online access; Online archive

Agronomy for Sustainable Development is a bimonthly peer-reviewed scientific journal covering research on the interactions between cropping systems and other activities in the context of sustainable development. It is published by Springer Science+Business Media on behalf of the French National Research Institute for Agriculture, Food and the Environment (INRAE). Articles are freely accessible one year after their publication. According to the Journal Citation Reports, the journal has a 2020 impact factor of 5.832.

== History ==
The journal was established in 1981 as Agronomie, with most articles in French. From 2003 to 2006, the journal underwent a drastic makeover, including a new title, a new cover design, and a switch to English-only publishing. To access articles published between 1981 and 2004, please consult the collection Agronomie.
