= John Davidson (botanist) =

Scottish-Canadian botanist (1878–1970)

- Born: August 6, 1878; Aberdeen, Scotland
- Died: February 10, 1970 (aged 91); Vancouver, British Columbia, Canada
- Education: Robert Gordon's College and University of Aberdeen
- Known for: First Provincial Botanist, British Columbia and Founding Director UBC Botanical Garden
- Scientific career
- Fields: Botanist
- Workplaces: University of British Columbia

John Davidson (6 August 1878 – 10 February 1970) was a notable Scottish-Canadian botanist.

== Biography ==
He was born in Aberdeen, Scotland.

He worked at the University of Aberdeen from 1893 to 1911. He later moved to Canada in the hopes of securing a professorship at the soon to be established University of British Columbia (UBC). Instead, he was appointed the first Provincial Botanist of British Columbia. Davidson established a herbarium on West Pender Street, Vancouver, and a botanical garden near New Westminster, at Coquitlam (at the Colony Farm and Essondale farming and mental hospital complex, which later became Riverview Hospital in the 1950s). This collection was moved to the UBC in 1916 where it became the UBC Botanical Garden. This move is often described as having involved the transfer of 25,000 plants, though this figure is an exaggeration. Even if Davidson and his staff transferred two thousand plants, the feat would still have been extraordinary. As a UBC faculty member in Botany from 1916 to 1948 Davidson was instrumental in developing botany teaching at the university.

He also founded the Vancouver Natural History Society (which has been renamed Nature Vancouver)

== Bibliography ==
Published works (partial list)

- 1922: "The Cascara Tree in British Columbia"
- 1923: "Commercial Drug Plant Cultivation in British Columbia"
- 1933: "Poisonous Plants of British Columbia"
- 1942: "The Cascara Tree in British Columbia"
- 1943: "Edible Plants of British Columbia"
- 1949: "The Cascara Tree in Relation to Drug Farming in British Columbia"

== See also ==
- UBC Botanical Garden
- Mount Davidson
