= Pakistan Journal of Pharmaceutical Sciences =

The Pakistan Journal of Pharmaceutical Sciences is a bimonthly peer-reviewed open access medical journal covering pharmaceutical sciences. It was established in 1988 and is published by the Faculty of Pharmacy, University of Karachi. The editor-in-chief is Iqbal Azhar (University of Karachi).

According to the Journal Citation Reports, the journal has a 2015 impact factor of 0.581.
