= Magnolia Press =

New Zealand scientific publisher

- Founded: 2001
- Country of origin: New Zealand
- Headquarters location: Auckland
- Publication types: Academic journals
- Nonfiction topics: Biology, taxonomy
- Official website: mapress.com

Magnolia Press is a New Zealand-based scientific publisher established in 2001. It publishes several specialised taxonomy and biology journals, as well as short run books. It operates the Biotaxa.org database.

== Journals ==
- Bionomina
- Bryophyte Diversity and Evolution (formerly Tropical Bryology)
- Bulletin of Phylogenetic Nomenclature
- Fauna of China Synopsis
- Journal of Insect Biodiversity
- Journal of the International Heteropterists' Society
- Megataxa
- Mesozoic
- Molluscan Research (formerly the Journal of the Malacological Society of Australia)
- Palaeoentomology
- Phytotaxa
- Zoosymposia
- Zootaxa
