= Phytotaxa =

Peer-reviewed scientific journal

- Discipline: Botanical taxonomy
- Language: English
- Edited by: Zhi-Qiang Zhang

Publication details
- History: 2009–present
- Publisher: Magnolia Press
- Open access: Hybrid
- Impact factor: 1.185 (2017)

Standard abbreviations
- ISO 4: Phytotaxa

Indexing
- ISSN: 1179-3155 (print); 1179-3163 (web)
- OCLC no.: 465307755

Links
- Journal homepage; Online access

Phytotaxa is a peer-reviewed scientific journal for rapid publication on any aspect of systematic botany. It publishes on a wide range of subjects, but focuses on new species, monographs, floras, revisions, reviews, and typification issues. Phytotaxa covers all plant groups covered by the International Code of Nomenclature for algae, fungi, and plants, including diatoms, fungi, algae, lichens, mosses, hornworts, liverworts, and vascular plants), both living and fossil.

The journal was established in 2009 by Maarten Christenhusz and the first issue appeared in October 2009. Authors have the option to publish open access.

== Abstracting and indexing ==
The journal is abstracted and indexed in Science Citation Index Expanded, Current Contents/Agriculture, Biology & Environmental Sciences, and BIOSIS Previews.

== See also ==
- Zootaxa
