= Pakistan Journal of Life and Social Sciences =

Academic journal

- Discipline: Life sciences, social sciences
- Language: English
- Edited by: Masood Akhtar

Publication details
- History: 2003–present
- Publisher: Elite Scientific Forum (Pakistan)
- Frequency: Biannually
- Open access: Delayed, after 1 year

Standard abbreviations
- ISO 4: Pak. J. Life Soc. Sci.

Indexing
- ISSN: 1727-4915 (print); 2221-7630 (web)
- LCCN: 2011313177
- OCLC no.: 750996336

Links
- Journal homepage; Online archives

The Pakistan Journal of Life and Social Sciences is a biannual peer-reviewed academic journal covering life sciences and social sciences research. It was established in 2003 and is published by the Elite Scientific Forum, Pakistan. The editor-in-chief is Masood Akhtar (Bahauddin Zakariya University).

== Reception ==
A study conducted by Ikram-ul-Haq of King Saud bin Abdulaziz University for Health Sciences to "explore the progress of social science research carried out by Pakistan", which was based on the "data retrieved from the Scopus database" and was concluded in November 2020, suggested that the journal had been one of the most "preferred source of publications" on the subject in Pakistan.

== Abstracting and indexing ==
The journal is abstracted and indexed in:

- Aquatic Sciences and Fisheries Abstracts
- CAB Abstracts
- EBSCO databases
- Scopus
- The Zoological Record
