= Journal of Applied Horticulture =

- Discipline: Horticulture
- Language: English
- Edited by: Shailendra Rajan

Publication details
- History: 1999–present
- Publisher: Society for the Advancement of Horticulture (India)
- Frequency: Triannually
- Open access: Delayed, after 6 months

Standard abbreviations
- ISO 4: J. Appl. Hortic.

Indexing
- CODEN: JAHOEC
- ISSN: 0972-1045
- OCLC no.: 60849312

Links
- Journal homepage; Online archive

The Journal of Applied Horticulture is a triannual peer-reviewed scientific journal published by the Society for the Advancement of Horticulture (India). Established in 1999 as a biannual publication, the journal increased its frequency to triannual in 2013 and is currently published quarterly. It covers all aspects of horticultural crops. The editor-in-chief is Shailendra Rajan (Ex Director, ICAR-Central Institute for Subtropical Horticulture).

== Abstracting and indexing ==
The journal is abstracted and indexed in:

- CAB Abstracts
- Chemical Abstracts Service
- EBSCO databases
- Emerging Sources Citation Index
- Food Science & Technology Abstracts
- Scopus
