= Pakistan Botanical Society =

- Formation: 1968
- Type: Learned society
- Headquarters: Department of Biology, University of Karachi
- Location: Karachi
- Region served: South Asia, Europe
- Official language: English, Urdu
- President: Dr. Rehana Kausar

The Pakistan Botanical Society is a learned society of professional botanists. It was established in 1968. Its headquarters are located in the Department of Biology at the University of Karachi and its current president is Prof. Dr. Seema Mahmood.

== Publications ==
The society publishes the Pakistan Journal of Botany bimonthly.
