= UBC Botanical Garden =

Botanical garden in Vancouver, Canada

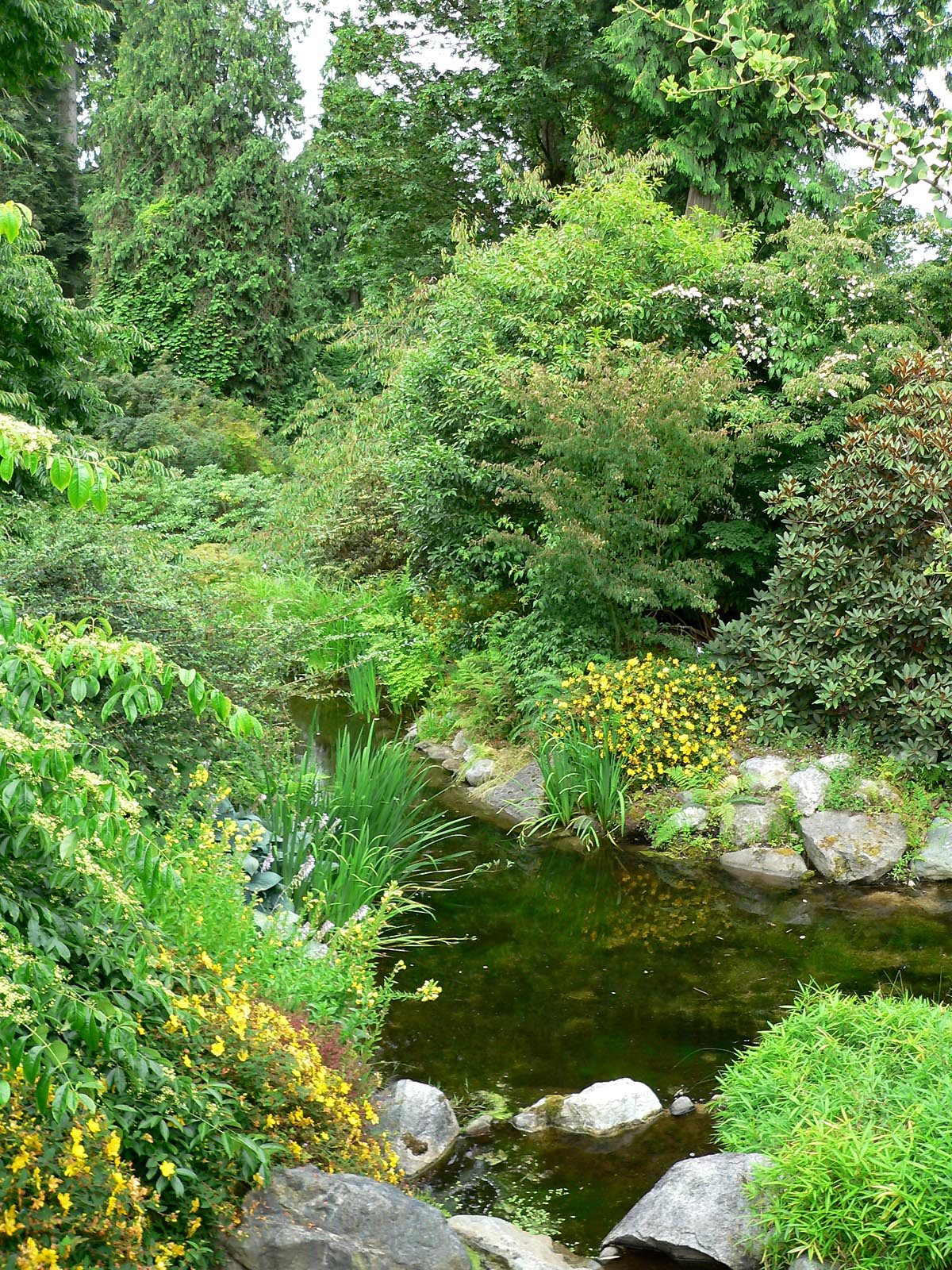
- Water feature in the UBC Botanical Garden
- Interactive map of UBC Botanical Garden
- Type: Botanical garden
- Location: 6804 S.W. Marine Drive, Vancouver, British Columbia; V6T 1Z4
- Coordinates: 49.254°N 123.251°W,
- Area: 44 hectares (110 acres)
- Established: 1916; 110 years ago
- Founder: John Davidson
- Operator: University of British Columbia
- Status: Open to the public
- Parking: On site
- Public transit: Bus, campus shuttle
- Director: Dee Ann Benard
- Facilities: Information centre, gift shop, toilets, shelter.
- Website: botanicalgarden.ubc.ca

The UBC Botanical Garden is a botanical garden located on the University of British Columbia campus in Vancouver, British Columbia. It maintains a documented living collection of temperate plants for the purposes of education, research, conservation, community outreach, and public display. Established in 1916, it is the oldest botanical garden at a university in Canada.

It is a member of the Canadian Garden Council, American Public Gardens Association, Botanic Gardens Conservation International, and the Plant Collections Network.

== History ==
John Davidson, or Botany John, was appointed British Columbia's first provincial botanist in 1911. He was given two assignments: complete a botanical survey of the province's flora and establish a botanical garden and herbarium. Davidson first established an arboretum, nursery, and botanical garden on the hospital lands of Essondale in Coquitlam with the assistance of the patients.

The government then set aside two acres of land (0.8 ha) at the Provincial Colony Farm in Essondale (later called Riverview) near New Westminster for the establishment of the first botanical garden. After the closure of the Office of the Provincial Botanist in 1916, the botanical garden relocated to the UBC campus in West Point Grey. This involved the transport of thousands of perennials and shrubs across forty kilometres of rough roads to the new location.

At UBC, the garden's original site was at the "Old Arboretum". All that remains of it today are the trees planted in 1916 by John Davidson. The old arboretum is now home to many buildings including the First Nations House of Learning.

In 1951, the entire UBC campus was designated as a botanical garden. The head of the Botany Department, Dr. T.M.C. (Tommy) Taylor, was appointed the Garden Director.

After several years of changing scope and mandate, in 1966 land was set aside near Thunderbird Stadium on the south end of the University campus for a stand-alone botanical garden. Dr. Roy Taylor was hired as the first director of UBC Botanical Garden at its current site.

In 1976, Dr. Roy L. Taylor, the Garden's director, initiated the formation of the Friends of the Garden (FoG), a volunteer organization aimed at supporting the Garden's educational and informational activities.

The 1980s and 1990s there was an introduction of specialized collections and gardens, including the Harold and Frances Holt Physic Garden, which showcases medicinal plants, and the Rhododendron Garden, which features a diverse array of rhododendron species.

Currently, the Garden is led by Dee Ann Benard who was appointed as Director in October 2023.

== Features ==
The garden measures approximately 20 hectares (49 acres) and has a collection of around 30,000 plants, representing 5,000 taxa from regions worldwide, including a large collection of magnolia, maple, mountain ash, Styracaceae, Rhododendron and climbing plants.

=== Gardens ===
- David C. Lam Asian Garden, a coastal native second-growth forest under-planted with Asian plants.
- E.H. Lohbrunner Alpine Garden, contains mountainous plants from around the world organized into geographic areas.
- BC Rainforest Garden, showcasing elements of the coastal rainforest of southwestern BC and the southern interior wet-belt.
- Carolinian Forest Garden, represents an eastern North American deciduous hardwood forest.
- Food Garden, contains edible crops worked in a sustainable manner, using organic techniques.
- Harold and Frances Holt Physic Garden, represents the original botanical gardens built to educate physicians and apothecaries.
- Garry Oak Meadow and Woodland Garden, a threatened ecosystem showcasing biodiversity and First Nations influence.
- Greenheart Tree Walk, a 310-metre-long tree top canopy walkway.
- Cultivara Tree Tours, guided climbs into the forest canopy, reaching up to 50 metres (165 ft) above the ground, offering hands-on learning about tree biology, forest ecology, and urban forestry.

There is also a multiple other small gardens, including the Pacific Slope Garden, Arbour Garden, Winter Garden, Perennial Borders Garden, Grow Green Demonstration Area, Contemporary Garden, Cattail Marsh, Walk in the Woods Trail.

UBC Botanical Garden also administers the Nitobe Memorial Garden, a traditional Japanese garden located on the north end of the Point Grey campus.

== Research ==
UBC Botanical Garden is a department within UBC's Faculty of Science focused on botanical research and education. Its living collections support studies in plant conservation, ecology, horticulture, and plant biodiversity. The Garden's facilities, including propagation nurseries and controlled-environment spaces, enable research, teaching, and community-based projects.

Researchers at the Garden have conducted a wide range of projects, from monitoring plant phenology in the British Columbia Rainforest Garden using infrared-sensitive cameras, to studies on geographic variation in birds of Western Canada, and initiatives focused on plant conservation and restoration, including growing rare or threatened native plants for habitat recovery. The Garden is also closely affiliated with UBC’s Centre for Plant Research, which focuses on plant systematics, evolutionary genomics, and gene expression, enhancing the Garden’s research capabilities.

UBC Botanical Garden also engages in national and international research partnerships. It contributes to initiatives like OneKP, generating large-scale gene sequence information for 1,000 plant species, and participates in Canadensys, a project that aims to digitize and share specimen data from Canadian biological collections. Through these activities and collaborations, the Garden continues to advance botanical science and conservation while providing vital resources for research, education, and public engagement.

== Education ==
Since 2012, UBC Botanical Garden has offered the Horticulture Trading Program (HTP), an 8-month provincially accredited full-time program running annually from August to April. The program curriculum combines classroom instruction with practical fieldwork. Students gain hands-on experience in plant propagation, garden maintenance, and ecological stewardship, preparing them for careers in horticulture and related fields.

In addition to the HTP program, the Garden's Sustainable Communities Field School which was established in 2015 and offers experiential sustainability education. In 2021, the Field School underwent an expansion with the Climate Change Adaptation initiative, a project aimed at responding to climate resilience. This work includes developing a regional adaptation strategy for the Pacific Northwest and conducting plant-specific case studies focused on collections such as maples, crop wild relatives, alpine, and native plants. This project focuses on building an online biodiversity atlas for southwestern BC in partnership with the Coastal Douglas-fir Conservation Partnership and UBC Okanagan’s labs, as well as producing decision-support tools for local governments and First Nations to guide climate adaptation and biodiversity conservation. In addition, the program continuously enhances educational tours with current content on biodiversity, and climate action to reflect evolving global and regional priorities.

== See also ==
- List of botanical gardens in Canada
