= Pakistan Journal of Botany =

PAKISTAN JOURNAL OF BOTANY
- Discipline: Plant Sciences
- Language: English
- Edited by: Muhammad Qaiser

Publication details
- Publisher: PAKISTAN BOTANICAL SOC
- ISO 4: Find out here

Indexing
- ISSN: 0556-3321 (print); 2070-3368 (web)

Links
- Journal homepage

The Pakistan Journal of Botany (print: ISSN 0556-3321, online: ISSN 2070-3368, CODEN: PJBB6) is a bimonthly scientific journal published by the Pakistan Botanical Society.

== Information ==
The journal was established in 1969 and publishes peer-reviewed full length research articles. Currently its contents are available from 2003 to date. However, on the completion of Digitalization Project, started in 2003 by Muhammad Ashraf, all issues will be available back to 1969. According to the Journal Citation Reports, its 2025 impact factor is 1.1.
