= Outline of applied science =

Overview of and topical guide to applied science

The following outline is provided as an overview of and topical guide to applied science:

Applied science – the branch of science that applies existing scientific knowledge to develop more practical applications, including inventions and other technological advancements. Science itself is the systematic enterprise that builds and organizes knowledge in the form of testable explanations and predictions about the universe.

== Branches of applied science ==
- Applied cryptography – applications of cryptography.
- Applied science – application of scientific knowledge transferred into a physical environment.
- Actuarial science — application of mathematical and statistical methods to assess risk in the insurance, finance, and other industries
- Agricultural science
  - Agronomy – science and technology of producing and using plants for food, fuel, feed, fiber, and reclamation.
  - Animal husbandry – agricultural practice of breeding and raising livestock.
  - Aquaculture – also known as aquafarming, is the farming of aquatic organisms such as fish, crustaceans, molluscs and aquatic plants.
    - Algaculture – form of aquaculture involving the farming of species of algae.
    - Mariculture – cultivation of marine organisms for food and other products in the open ocean, an enclosed section of the ocean, or in tanks, ponds or raceways which are filled with seawater.
  - Agriculture – science of farming
    - Cuniculture – also known as rabbit farming, is the breeding and raising domestic rabbits, usually for their meat or fur.
    - Fungiculture – process of producing food, medicine, and other products by the cultivation of mushrooms and other fungi.
    - Heliciculture – also called snail farming, is the process of farming or raising land snails specifically for human consumption, and more recently, to obtain snail slime for cosmetics use.
    - Olericulture – science of vegetable growing, dealing with the culture of non-woody (herbaceous) plants for food.
    - Sericulture – also called silk farming, is the rearing of silkworms for the production of silk. Although there are several commercial species of silkworms, Bombyx mori is the most widely used and intensively studied.
  - Food science – study concerned with all technical aspects of foods, beginning with harvesting or slaughtering, and ending with its cooking and consumption, an ideology commonly referred to as "from field to fork". It is the discipline in which the engineering, biological, and physical sciences are used to study the nature of foods, the causes of deterioration, the principles underlying food processing, and the improvement of foods for the consuming public.
  - Forestry – art and science of managing forests, tree plantations, and related natural resources.
    - Arboriculture – cultivation, management, and study of individual trees, shrubs, vines, and other perennial woody plants.
    - Silviculture – practice of controlling the establishment, growth, composition, health, and quality of forests to meet diverse needs and values. It includes regenerating, tending and harvesting techniques.
  - Horticulture – art, science, technology and business of intensive plant cultivation for human use
    - Floriculture – discipline of horticulture concerned with the cultivation of flowering and ornamental plants for gardens and for floristry, comprising the floral industry.
    - Hydroculture – growing of plants in a soilless medium, or an aquatic based environment. Plant nutrients are distributed via water. Hydroculture is aquatic horticulture.
      - Hydroponics – subset of hydroculture and is a method of growing plants using mineral nutrient solutions, in water, without soil.
  - Permaculture – branch of ecological design and ecological engineering, which develop sustainable human settlements and self-maintained agricultural systems modeled from natural ecosystems.
- Architecture – process and product of planning, designing and construction. Architectural works, in the material form of buildings, are often perceived as cultural symbols and as works of art.
  - Architectural engineering – application of engineering principles and technology to building design and construction.
  - Building science – collection of scientific knowledge that focuses on the analysis and control of the physical phenomena affecting buildings.
- Computing technology (outline) – computer hardware and software, and computing methods.
- Education – any act or experience that has a formative effect on the mind, character, or physical ability of an individual. In its technical sense, education is the process by which society deliberately transmits its accumulated knowledge, skills, and values from one generation to another.
- Electronics – branch of physics, engineering and technology dealing with electrical circuits that involve active electrical components such as vacuum tubes, transistors, diodes and integrated circuits, and associated passive interconnection technologies.
- Energy technology (outline) – interdisciplinary engineering science having to do with the efficient, safe, environmentally friendly and economical extraction, conversion, transportation, storage and use of energy, targeted towards yielding high efficiency whilst skirting side effects on humans, nature and the environment.
- Energy storage (outline) – accomplished by devices or physical media that store some form of energy to perform some useful operation at a later time. A device that stores energy is sometimes called an accumulator.
- Engineering (outline) – discipline, art, skill and profession of acquiring and applying scientific, mathematical, economic, social, and practical knowledge, in order to design and build structures, machines, devices, systems, materials and processes that safely realize improvements to the lives of people.
  - Aerospace engineering – Aerospace engineering is the primary branch of engineering concerned with the design, construction, and science of aircraft and spacecraft. It is divided into two major and overlapping branches: aeronautical engineering and astronautical engineering. The former deals with craft that stay within Earth's atmosphere, and the latter with craft that operate outside it.
  - Agricultural engineering – engineering discipline that applies engineering science and technology to agricultural production and processing.
    - Agricultural science – broad multidisciplinary field that encompasses the parts of exact, natural, economic and social sciences that are used in the practice and understanding of agriculture.
  - Applied engineering – field concerned with the application of management, design, and technical skills for the design and integration of systems, the execution of new product designs, the improvement of manufacturing processes, and the management and direction of physical and/or technical functions of a firm or organization.
  - Bioengineering – application of concepts and methods of biology (and secondarily of physics, chemistry, mathematics, and computer science) to solve real-world problems related to the life sciences and/or the application thereof, using engineering's own analytical and synthetic methodologies and also its traditional sensitivity to the cost and practicality of the solution(s) arrived at.
    - Biomedical engineering – application of engineering principles and design concepts to medicine and biology.
  - Chemical engineering – application of physical science (e.g., chemistry and physics), and life sciences (e.g., biology, microbiology and biochemistry) with mathematics and economics, to the process of converting raw materials or chemicals into more useful or valuable forms.
  - Civil engineering – deals with the design, construction, and maintenance of the physical and naturally built environment, including works like roads, bridges, canals, dams, and buildings. Civil engineering has many sub-disciplines.
  - Computer engineering – design and development of computer systems
    - Artificial intelligence (outline) – intelligence of machines and the branch of computer science that aims to create it.
  - Electrical engineering – field of engineering that generally deals with the study and application of electricity, electronics and electromagnetism.
  - Engineering technology (outline) – development and implementation of existing technology within a field of engineering.
  - Environmental engineering science – multidisciplinary field of engineering science that combines the biological, chemical and physical sciences with the field of engineering.
  - Industrial engineering – branch of engineering dealing with the optimization of complex processes or systems
    - Control engineering – engineering discipline that applies control theory to design systems with desired behaviors.
    - Manufacturing engineering – engineering discipline of creating quality products from raw materials in the most efficient way possible.
  - Ceramic engineering – science and technology of creating objects from inorganic, non-metallic materials.
  - Language engineering – deliberate effort to influence the function, structure, or acquisition of languages or language variety within a speech community.
  - Marine engineering – engineering of boats, ships, oil rigs and any other marine vessel
  - Materials science and engineering – interdisciplinary field applying the properties of matter to various areas of science and engineering. This scientific field investigates the relationship between the structure of materials at atomic or molecular scales and their macroscopic properties.
  - Mechanical engineering – discipline of engineering that applies the principles of physics and materials science for analysis, design, manufacturing, and maintenance of mechanical systems.
  - Mining engineering – engineering discipline that involves the practice, the theory, the science, the technology, and application of extracting and processing minerals from a naturally occurring environment.
  - Nuclear engineering – branch of engineering concerned with the application of the breakdown (fission) as well as the fusion of atomic nuclei and/or the application of other sub-atomic physics, based on the principles of nuclear physics.
  - Polymer engineering – subfield of materials science concerned with polymers, primarily synthetic polymers such as plastics.
  - Engineering physics – study of the combined disciplines of physics, engineering and mathematics in order to develop an understanding of the interrelationships of these three disciplines.
  - Security engineering – focuses on the security aspects in the design of systems that need to be able to deal robustly with possible sources of disruption, ranging from natural disasters to malicious acts.
  - Software engineering (outline) – application of a systematic, disciplined, quantifiable approach to the development, operation, and maintenance of software, and the study of these approaches; that is, the application of engineering to software.
  - Systems engineering – interdisciplinary field of engineering focusing on how complex engineering projects should be designed and managed over their life cycles.
- Environmental science – multidisciplinary academic field that integrates physical, biological and information sciences to the study of the environment, and the solution of environmental problems.
  - Conservation biology – the study of the conservation of nature and of Earth's biodiversity with the aim of protecting species, their habitats, and ecosystems.
  - Environmental technology – application of one or more of environmental science, green chemistry, environmental monitoring and electronic devices to monitor, model and conserve the natural environment and resources, and to curb the negative impacts of human involvement.
  - Fisheries science – academic discipline of managing and understanding fisheries. It is a multidisciplinary science, which draws on the disciplines of limnology, oceanography, freshwater biology, marine biology, conservation, ecology, population dynamics, economics and management to attempt to provide an integrated picture of fisheries.
- Forensic science (outline) – application of a broad spectrum of sciences to answer questions of interest to a legal system. This may be in relation to a crime or a civil action.
- Health science – application of science, technology, engineering or mathematics to the delivery of healthcare
  - Anatomy – branch of biology and medicine that is the consideration of the structure of living things.
    - Human anatomy – scientific study of the morphology of the adult human.
  - Conservation medicine – emerging, interdisciplinary field that studies the relationship between human and animal health, and environmental conditions.
  - Dentistry – branch of medicine that is involved in the study, diagnosis, prevention, and treatment of diseases, disorders and conditions of the oral cavity, maxillofacial area and the adjacent and associated structures and their impact on the human body.
  - Optometry – health care profession concerned with the health of the eyes and related structures, as well as vision, visual systems, and vision information processing in humans.
  - Medicine – science of healing. To elaborate, it is the applied science of the diagnosis, treatment, and prevention of disease. It encompasses a variety of health care practices evolved to maintain and restore health by the prevention and treatment of illness in human beings.
    - Biomedicine – branch of medical science that applies biological and physiological principles to clinical practice.
    - Cardiology – medical specialty dealing with disorders of the heart (specifically the human heart).
    - Dermatology – branch of medicine dealing with the skin and its diseases, a unique specialty with both medical and surgical aspects.
    - Endocrinology – medical specialty dealing with the endocrine system, its diseases, and its specific secretions (hormones), and the interactions of these with all aspects of bodily functioning
    - Gastroenterology – branch of medicine whereby the digestive system and its disorders are studied.
    - Gynecology – medical practice dealing with the health of the female reproductive system (uterus, vagina, and ovaries).
    - Immunology – study of the immune system.
    - Internal medicine – medical specialty dealing with the prevention, diagnosis, and treatment of adult diseases.
    - Neurology – medical specialty dealing with disorders of the nervous system.
    - Ophthalmology – branch of medicine that deals with the anatomy, physiology and diseases of the eye.
    - Pathology – precise study and diagnosis of disease.
      - Pathophysiology – study of the changes of normal mechanical, physiological, and biochemical functions, either caused by a disease, or resulting from an abnormal syndrome.
    - Pediatrics – branch of medicine that deals with the medical care of infants, children, and adolescents.
    - Psychiatry – medical specialty devoted to the study and treatment of mental disorders.
    - Radiology – medical specialty that employs the use of imaging to both diagnose and treat disease visualised within the human body.
    - Toxicology – branch of biology, chemistry, and medicine concerned with the study of the adverse effects of chemicals on living organisms.
    - Urology – medical and surgical specialty that focuses on the urinary tracts of males and females, and on the reproductive system of males.
  - Nutrition – studies the relationship between diet and states of health and disease.
  - Nursing – Nursing is a healthcare profession focused on the care of individuals, families, and communities so they may attain, maintain, or recover optimal health and quality of life.
  - Pharmacology – branch of medicine and biology concerned with the study of drug action.
  - Pharmacy – health profession that links the health sciences with the chemical sciences and it is charged with ensuring the safe and effective use of pharmaceutical drugs.
  - Physical therapy – health profession that promotes, maintains and restores health through physical examination, diagnosis, intervention, patient education, rehabilitation, and prevention.
  - Physiology – science of the function of living systems.
  - Veterinary medicine – branch of science that deals with the prevention, diagnosis and treatment of disease, disorder and injury in non-human animals.
- Applied linguistics – interdisciplinary field of study that identifies, investigates, and offers solutions to language-related real-life problems.
- Management (outline) – getting people together to accomplish desired goals and objectives using available resources efficiently and effectively.
  - Accounting – process of communicating financial information about a business entity to users such as shareholders and managers.
  - Finance – addresses the ways in which individuals, businesses and organizations raise, allocate and use monetary resources over time, taking into account the risks entailed in their projects.
  - Marketing – social and managerial processes by which products, services and value are exchanged in order to fulfil individuals' or group's needs and wants. These processes include, but are not limited to, advertising, promotion, distribution, and sales.
  - Organizational behavior – field of study that investigates the impact that individuals, groups and structures have on behavior within an organization.
    - Human resource management – strategic approach to the effective management of people in a company or organization
  - Operations – those ongoing recurring (cyclic) activities involved in the running of a business for the purpose of producing value for the stakeholders.
  - Strategic management – field that deals with the major intended and emergent initiatives taken by general managers on behalf of owners, involving utilization of resources, to enhance the performance of firms in their external environments.
- Metrology
- Applied mathematics – branch of mathematics concerned with mathematical methods that are typically used in science, engineering, business, and industry. Thus, "applied mathematics" is a mathematical science with specialized knowledge.
- Microtechnology – technology with features near one micrometre (one millionth of a metre, or 1μm).
- Military science – study of the technique, psychology, practice and other phenomena which constitute war and armed conflict.
  - Military organization – structuring of the armed forces of a state so as to offer military capability required by the national defence policy.
  - Military history – humanities discipline within the scope of general historical recording of armed conflict in the history of humanity, and its impact on the societies, their cultures, economies and changing intra and international relationships.
  - Military engineering – the art and practice of designing and building military works and maintaining lines of military transport and communications.
  - Military recruit training – Recruit training, more commonly known as basic training and colloquially called boot camp, is the initial indoctrination and instruction given to new military personnel, enlisted and officer.
  - Military strategy and tactics – set of ideas implemented by military organizations to pursue desired strategic goals
- Applied physics – physics intended for a particular technological or practical use. It is usually considered as a bridge between "pure" physics and engineering.
  - Optics – branch of physics which involves the behavior and properties of light, including its interactions with matter and the construction of instruments that use or detect it.
  - Nanotechnology (outline) – study of manipulating matter on an atomic and molecular scale. Generally, nanotechnology deals with developing materials, devices, or other structures possessing at least one dimension sized from 1 to 100 nanometres. Quantum mechanical effects are important at this quantum-realm scale.
  - Nuclear technology (outline) – technology that involves the reactions of atomic nuclei. Among the notable nuclear technologies are nuclear power, nuclear medicine, and nuclear weapons. It has found applications from smoke detectors to nuclear reactors, and from gun sights to nuclear weapons.
- Space science – discipline encompassing the fields of study that involve space exploration and the study of natural phenomena occurring in outer space.
  - Astronautics – science of spacefaring and spaceflight.
  - Astronomy – the study of natural objects and phenomena.
  - Space exploration – the discovery and exploration of celestial structures in outer space by developing space technology.
- Technical geography – is the branch of geography that involves using, studying, and creating tools to obtain, analyze, interpret, understand, and communicate spatial information. The spatial data types a technical geographer employs may vary widely, including human and physical geography topics, with the common thread being the techniques and philosophies employed.
  - Geomatics –is defined as the discipline concerned with the collection, distribution, storage, analysis, processing, and presentation of geographic data.Broadly, it encompasses the products, services, and tools required to integrate and manage this geospatial information.Formally known as surveying engineering, the field has evolved significantly and is now classified by the UNESCO Encyclopedia of Life Support Systems under the specialized branch of technical geography.
  - GISCINCE – is a scientific discipline at the crossroads of computational science, social science, and natural science that studies geographic information, including how it represents phenomena in the real world, how it represents the way humans understand the world, and how it can be captured, organized, and analyzed.It is a sub-field of geography, specifically part of technical geography.t has .
  - Quantitative geography – is a subfield and methodological approach that develops and applies scientific, mathematical, and statistical methods to analyze and model geographic phenomena. By collecting and analyzing quantifiable data, it aims to explain and predict the spatial distribution and dynamics of both human and physical environments.This approach strictly aligns with the scientific method, where falsifiable hypotheses are generated and rigorously tested through observational and empirical studies.
  - Geoinformatics –is a scientific field primarily within the domains of Computer Science and technical geography.It focuses on the programming of applications, spatial data structures, and the analysis of objects and space-time phenomena related to the surface and underneath of Earth and other celestial bodies.
  - Remote sensing – acquisition of information about an object or phenomenon, without making physical contact with the object.
  - Photogrammetry – practice of determining the geometric properties of objects from photographic images.
  - Geodesign – is a set of concepts and methods used to involve all stakeholders and various professions in collaboratively designing and realizing the optimal solution for spatial challenges in the built and natural environments, utilizing all available techniques and data in an integrated process. Geodesgin is a methodology that provides the context and content for making spatial decisions. It provides the practical means for implementing change.
  - Spatial Analysis — which serves as the analytical engine by exploring patterns, relationships, and underlying processes within geographic data.
  - Geodesy—which provides the fundamental geometric infrastructure and coordinate frameworks—Geoinformatics, Spatial Analysis, and Quantitative Geography. While some fields exhibit overlap with engineering disciplines, modern literature increasingly classifies Geodesy as a core technical component necessary for precise geospatial modeling and spatial logic.

== History of applied science ==
- History of applied linguistics
- History of applied mathematics
- History of applied physics
- History of artificial intelligence
  - Timeline of artificial intelligence
- History of ceramic engineering
- History of computing technology
  - History of computing
  - History of computing hardware
- History of electronics
  - Early electronic components
  - History of electronic engineering
- History of energy
- History of energy storage
- History of environmental engineering
- History of forensic science
- History of forestry
- History of materials science
- History of medicine
- History of nanotechnology
- History of nuclear technology
- History of optics
- History of software engineering

== Applied science education ==
- Fachhochschule
- Institute of technology

=== Degrees and certificates ===
- Bachelor of Applied Science – undergraduate degree awarded for a course of study that generally lasts three to four years in the United Kingdom and Australia, and four to six years in Canada, the Netherlands and the United States.
- Applied science technician
- Applied science technologist

=== Applied science schools ===
- University of applied sciences (Finland)

== Applied science organizations ==
- Fraunhofer Society
- Saskatchewan Applied Science Technologists & Technicians

== Applied science publications ==
- American Journal of Applied Sciences
- Foresight: The International Journal of Applied Forecasting
- Intégral: The Journal of Applied Musical Thought
- International Journal of Applied Management and Technology
- International Journal of Applied Mathematics and Computer Science
- International Journal of Applied Philosophy
- ITL – International Journal of Applied Linguistics
- Japanese Journal of Applied Physics
- Journal of Applied Behavior Analysis
- Journal of Applied Biomechanics
- Journal of Applied Biomedicine
- Journal of Applied Developmental Psychology
- Journal of Applied Ecology
- Journal of Applied Econometrics
- Journal of Applied Economics
- Journal of Applied Electrochemistry
- Journal of Applied Gerontology
- Journal of Applied Horticulture
- Journal of Applied Ichthyology
- Journal of Applied Mathematics and Mechanics
- Journal of Applied Meteorology and Climatology
- Journal of Applied Non-Classical Logics
- Journal of Applied Philosophy
- Journal of Applied Physics
- Journal of Applied Physiology
- Journal of Applied Polymer Science
- Journal of Applied Psychology
- Journal of Applied Social Psychology
- Journal of Applied Social Science
- Journal of Applied Toxicology
- The Journal of Applied Behavioral Science

== See also ==
- Outline of science
  - Outline of natural science
    - Outline of physical science
      - Outline of earth science
  - Outline of formal science
  - Outline of social science
- Outline of technology
