= Interpersonal gap =

Model of communication by John L. Wallen

The interpersonal gap is a model of communication developed by John L. Wallen, an educator and a pioneer in the fields of emotional intelligence and interpersonal communication. As Chinmaya and Vargo state in their 1979 paper on Wallen "Many people who conduct interpersonal relations laboratories have been influenced by the ideas of John Wallen, a social psychologist from Portland, Oregon. He has written a number of papers which identify the sources of difficulty in communication. In these writings, Wallen focuses on the process of communication, not the underlying motives, drives, traits, attitudes, or personality characteristics of the individual. Wallen's ideas are easily understandable to laymen and professional alike."

== John L. Wallen ==
John Wallen (March 24, 1918 – July 31, 2001) was an educator and communication specialist. After graduating from Harvard College in 1940, he earned advance degrees in psychology at Ohio State University, Harvard University and the University of Oregon. He then taught at the University of Maryland and at Black Mountain College in North Carolina, before moving to Oregon in 1948. In Oregon, he had been director of research at the Boys and Girls Society of Oregon, associate professor at Portland State College, director of the Human Relations and Development Group at Tektronix, and staff member of the Northwest Regional Educational Laboratory. He had also been president of the Oregon Psychological Association and fellow of the National Training Laboratories (NTL) Institute for Applied Behavioral Science in Washington, D.C. It was during his time in Oregon that he developed the interpersonal gap.

According to Chinmaya and Vargo, "Wallen...integrated the work of many scholars including Allport (1949), Hayakawa (1964), Heider (1958), Korzybski (1958), Lewin (1926, 1948, 1951), and Rank (1941, 1968) into a systematic theory of communication." Wallen's only known published work was the co-authored book, Counseling with Returned Servicemen, with Carl Rogers, in 1946. He authored numerous unpublished papers, including "The Interpersonal Gap" in 1967. Wallen primarily taught his theories in academic settings (he was training educators). He did so prior to the age of computers. At the time he was of the opinion that if his "ideas are useful, they will spread through personalized channels of communication". Specifically, he wanted educators to feel free to mimeograph his work and distribute copies. With this in mind, he avoided publishing or copyrighting his work. While this unorthodox approach allowed educators to freely distribute his mimeographed works, it also hampered the spread of his theories outside of the circle of his immediate colleagues in the Pacific Northwest region of the United States.

Beginning in the Pacific Northwest, but spreading elsewhere, Wallen's theories were applied extensively to training teachers and faculty in school systems through the publications of the Portland-based Northwest Regional Educational Laboratory. NWREL was directed at the time by Charles Jung. Jung was a student of Ronald Lippitt's, who in turn was a student of Kurt Lewin, the creator of the T-group and regarded by many as the father of social psychology and organization development. Lewin was a major influence on Wallen. Wallen's work was also spread through the extensive publications of another Lippitt student, Richard Schmuck, of the Center for the Advanced Study of Educational Administration at the University of Oregon.

The interpersonal gap also became a core theory in the T-group and organization development methods of Robert P. Crosby, who worked closely with Wallen from 1968 to 1975. The two co-led several National Training Laboratories T-groups during that time. When Crosby founded the Leadership Institute of Seattle (LIOS) Applied Behavioral Science Graduate Program, he made Wallen's material a core requirement of the curriculum, and he did the same when founding and leading the ALCOA corporate leadership program from 1990 to 2005. During Crosby's career in organization development, he used the interpersonal gap model in numerous culture change and performance improvement initiatives, most famously during the PECO nuclear turnaround following the shutdown of the Peach Bottom Atomic Power Station for human performance issues by the Nuclear Regulatory Commission in 1987. Crosby and his associates led Wallen-based T-groups, known as "Tough Stuff Emotional Intelligence in the Workplace" workshops.

Chinmaya and Vargo conclude their paper thusly: "One of the leaders in the study of the nature and process of communication is John Wallen. John Wallen's ideas have influenced a number of human relations practitioners. The communication skills are especially valuable in that they are easily demonstrated and readily learned by almost anyone. The effects of using the skills are quickly apparent. For these reasons, the concepts presented here can be of great value to teachers, counsellors, parents, spouses, and friends."

== Theory ==
The interpersonal gap highlights several core emotional intelligence (EQ) skills. For example, Wallen emphasized the role of the receiver when communicating rather than just the sender, counter to most models of communication. As part of the model, Wallen identified four key skills (behavioral specifics, feeling description, perception check and paraphrase) that became the cornerstone of the T-group-based experiential training developed by Crosby.

According to Wallen's interpersonal gap paper, "The most basic and recurring problems in social life stem from what you intend and the actual effect of your actions on others." As described in the self-improvement book Fight, Flight, Freeze, "Wallen's theory is that each of us has intentions in every interaction (we intend a certain impact), we translate (or encode) our intentions into words and actions, the people we are interacting with translate (decode) our words and actions, and the decoding determines the initial emotional impact on them," as illustrated in the following graph:

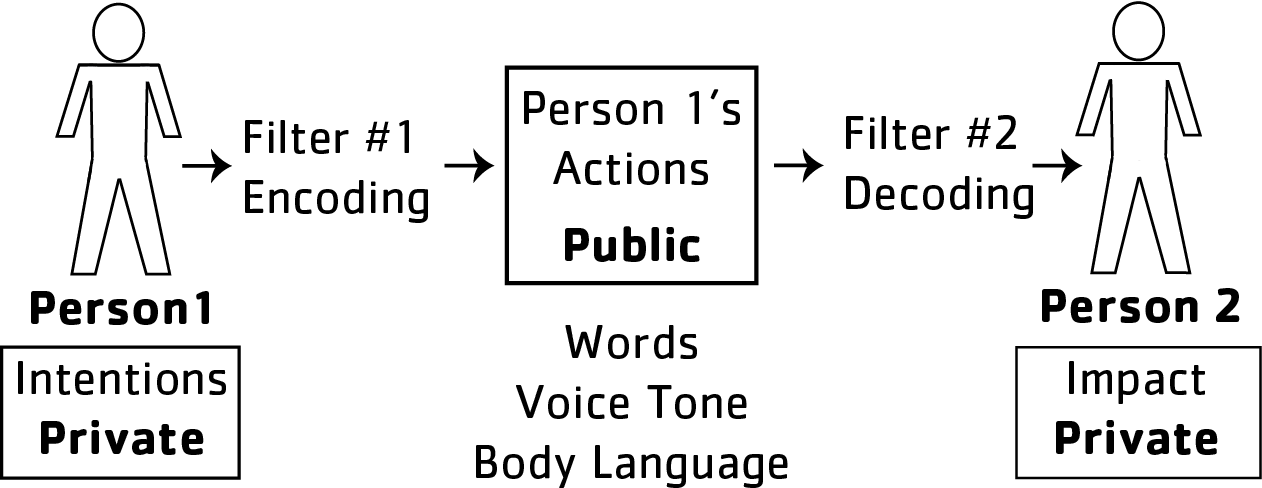
The Interpersonal Gap by John L. Wallen

- Note: Wallen did not use the word filter (rather he spoke of each person's unique method of encoding and decoding) nor did he use the behaviors outlined in Albert Mehrabian's famous study (words, tone of voice, body language). Both additions come from the work of Crosby and his associates. This graphic is reprinted from Fight, Flight, Freeze.

In Wallen's model there is ample potential for misunderstanding at any step in the process, beginning with understanding oneself - that is, with having clarity about what impact one really wants in any given interaction. Such misunderstandings are what Wallen refers to as "gaps". As he puts it, "Interpersonal gap refers to the degree of congruence between one person's intentions and the effect produced in the other. If the effect is what is intended, the gap has been bridged. If the effect is the opposite of what was intended, the gap has become greater."

Wallen goes on to say, "We see our own actions in the light of our own intentions, but we see the other's actions not in the light of the other person's intentions but in the effect on us." In other words, the interpersonal gap indicates that everyone knows themselves by their own intentions. Others are known through interpretations. Wallen's perspective contrasts with the dominant cultural paradigm that says "I know you by your actions." If that were true, then the other person must change. The interpersonal gap, in contrast, points inward. To learn what the other person intended, Wallen advocates using specific behavioral skills combined with a genuine intent of understanding the other (the importance of being genuine in one's intention to close gaps is one reflection of the influence of Carl Rogers on Wallen's work).

Wallen's model postulates that everyone creates their own reactions and emotional responses through their interpretations of others. He held that misunderstandings were the cause of most conflict, and that such conflict could be prevented or resolved through understanding the process of communication, and through situational application of specific skills.

Wallen identified four behavioral skills with which to close interpersonal gaps. Crosby described them this way:

- Behavior description: Describing behavior without adding judgment or interpretation
- Feeling description: Describe one's own feeling
- Perception check: Check or guess feeling another is having
- Paraphrase: Verify understanding and explore meaning of another
