= Varnsdorf =

- Town
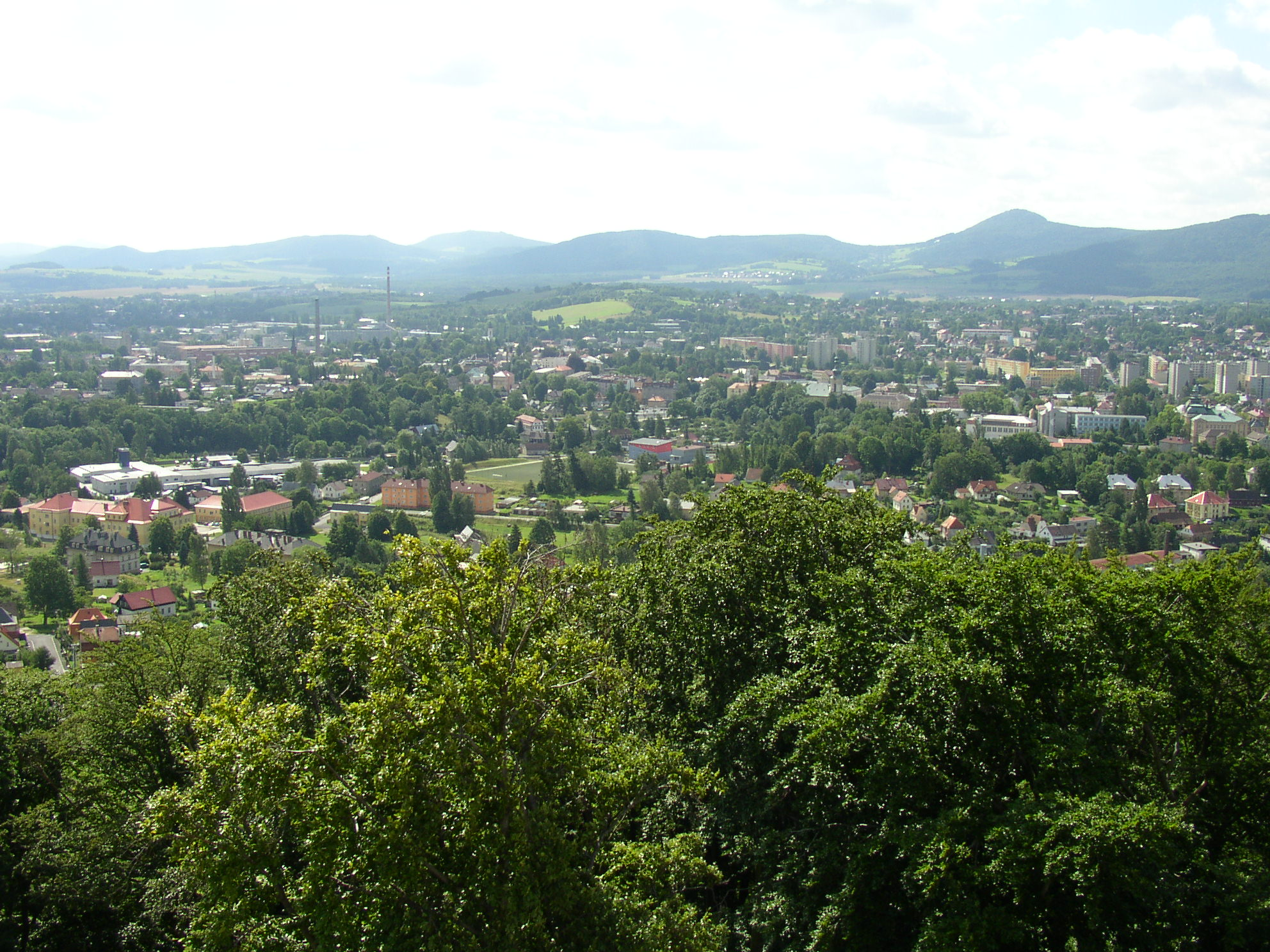
- View from the north

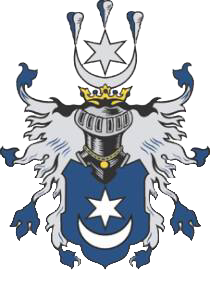
- Flag Coat of arms

- Location in the Czech Republic
- Coordinates: 50°54′42″N 14°37′6″E
- Country: Czech Republic
- Region: Ústí nad Labem
- District: Děčín
- First mentioned: 1357

Government
  - Mayor: Jan Šimek

Area
  - Total: 26.24 km^{2} (10.13 sq mi)
- Elevation: 332 m (1,089 ft)

Population (2026-01-01)
  - Total: 14,645
  - Density: 558.1/km^{2} (1,446/sq mi)
- Time zone: UTC+1 (CET)
  - Summer (DST): UTC+2 (CEST)
- Postal code: 407 47
- Website: www.varnsdorf.cz

Varnsdorf (Czech pronunciation: [ˈvarnzdorf]; German: Warnsdorf) is a town in Děčín District in the Ústí nad Labem Region of the Czech Republic. It has about 15,000 inhabitants. It lies on the Mandau River in the Lusatian Highlands, on the border with Germany. Varnsdorf is an industrial town, known primarily for the textile and engineering industries.

From 1681 to 1919, Varnsdorf was owned by the Liechtenstein family. Until its promotion to a town in 1868, it was just a village.

== Administrative division ==
Varnsdorf consists of three municipal parts (in brackets population according to the 2021 census):

- Varnsdorf (14,049)
- Studánka (340)
- Světliny 1.díl (1)

== Etymology ==
The name is derived from the Middle High German given name Werinolt. In the oldest documents, the settlement's name was written in Latin as Vernoldi villa, meaning "Werinolt's village", but soon it was distorted to Warnsdorf. The Czech name is a transcription of the German name.

== Geography ==
Varnsdorf is located about 31 kilometres (19 mi) northeast of Děčín. It lies in the salient region of Šluknov Hook, on the border with Germany.

Varnsdorf is situated in the Lusatian Highlands. The highest point is the hill Špičák at 544 m (1,785 ft) above sea level. The Mandau River (here called Mandava) flows through the town.

== History ==
The first written mention of Varnsdorf is from 1357. The village was founded in the first half of the 13th century. In 1681, the entire Warnsdorf estate was purchased by the Liechtenstein family and it remained in their possession until 1919.

In 1849, Old Varnsdorf (Alt Warnsdorf) merged with five smaller villages and created a new municipality called Warnsdorf. It was the largest municipality in the Austrian Empire by population without town rights. In 1868, Warnsdorf became a town.

Prior to the end of World War I, Warnsdorf was part of Austria-Hungary's Cisleithania. According to the Treaty of Saint-Germain-en-Laye, the town became part of the newly established Czechoslovakia in 1918.

Before the Holocaust, 211 Jews lived in Varnsdorf. Following the end of World War II, most of its German-speaking population was expelled to Germany.

In 1980, the municipality of Studánka joined Varnsdorf.

== Demographics ==
Historical population

Year	Pop.	±%
1869	15,610	—
1880	17,604	+12.8%
1890	20,654	+17.3%
1900	23,501	+13.8%
1910	25,589	+8.9%

Year	Pop.	±%
1921	22,242	−13.1%
1930	24,742	+11.2%
1950	15,782	−36.2%
1961	14,089	−10.7%
1970	14,512	+3.0%

Year	Pop.	±%
1980	16,356	+12.7%
1991	16,266	−0.6%
2001	16,040	−1.4%
2011	15,263	−4.8%
2021	14,390	−5.7%

Source: Censuses

Around 2,500 Buddhist Vietnamese live in and around Varnsdorf. In 2008, the Thien An Buddhist Pagoda was consecrated in Varnsdorf, the first Vietnamese Buddhist temple in the Czech Republic.

== Economy ==
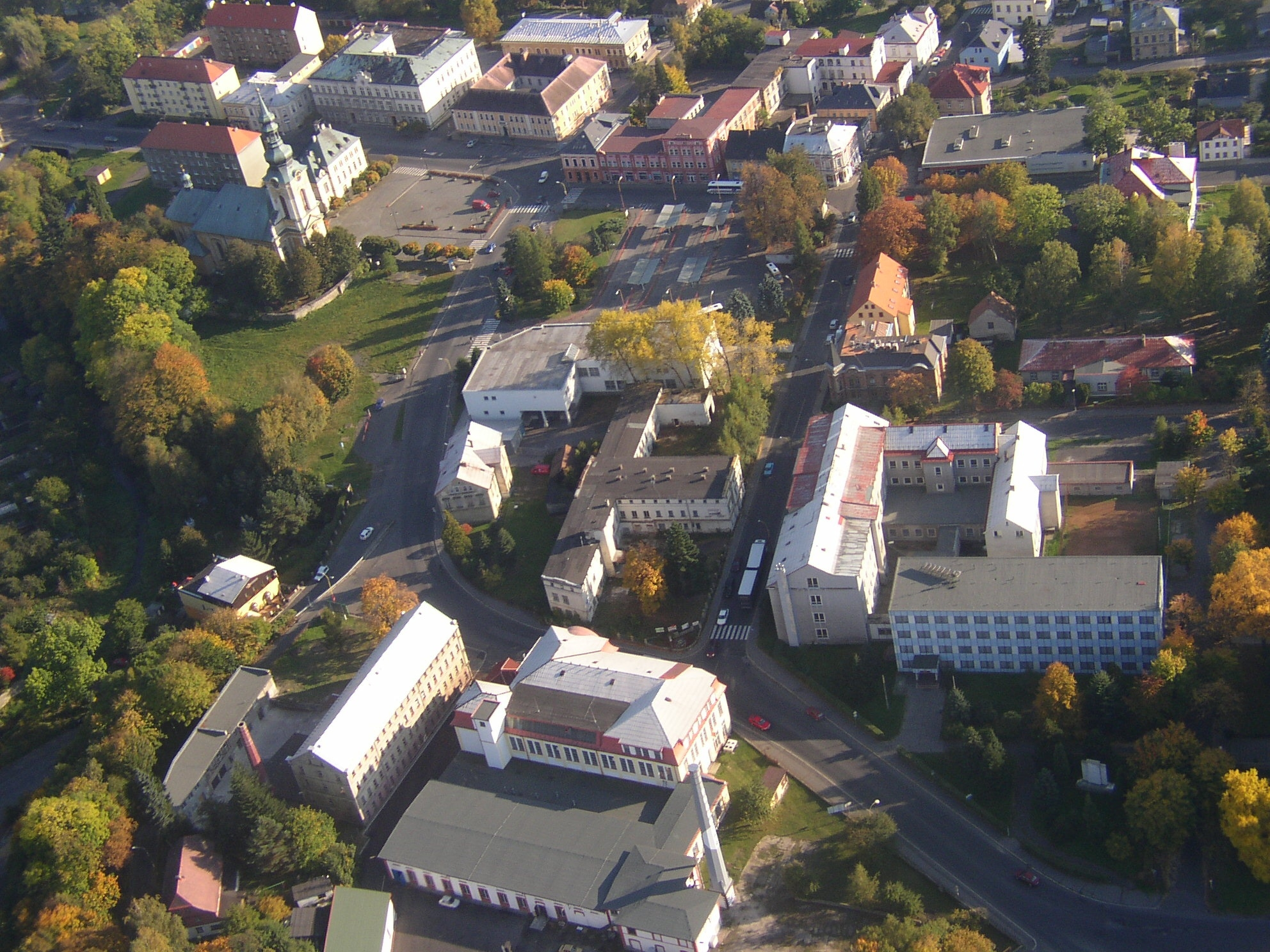
Aerial view of Náměstí E. Beneše

Varnsdorf is an industrial centre of the region. The town became well known for the textile industry. Its tradition here dates back to 1777, when the Velveta company was founded and became a significant manufacturer of cotton fabrics, especially for clothing purposes. Other big textile company with headquarters in Varnsdorf is Frottana – Bohemia, producer of towels.

The engineering industry is represented by Továrny obráběcích strojů – TOS company (machine tools manufacturer) and KWL s.r.o., producer of cable harnesses.

Varnsdorf is also home to the Kocour Brewery, who make a range of ales, including American style IPA and a stout.

== Transport ==
Varnsdorf has road border crossings with the German towns of Seifhennersdorf and Großschönau, and a railway border crossing to Großschönau.

Varnsdorf is located on the regional railway line Liberec–Seifhennersdorf and on the local railway line Varnsdorf–Rybniště. The town is served by three train stations: Varnsdorf, Varnsdorf staré nádraží and Varnsdorf-pivovar Kocour.

== Culture ==
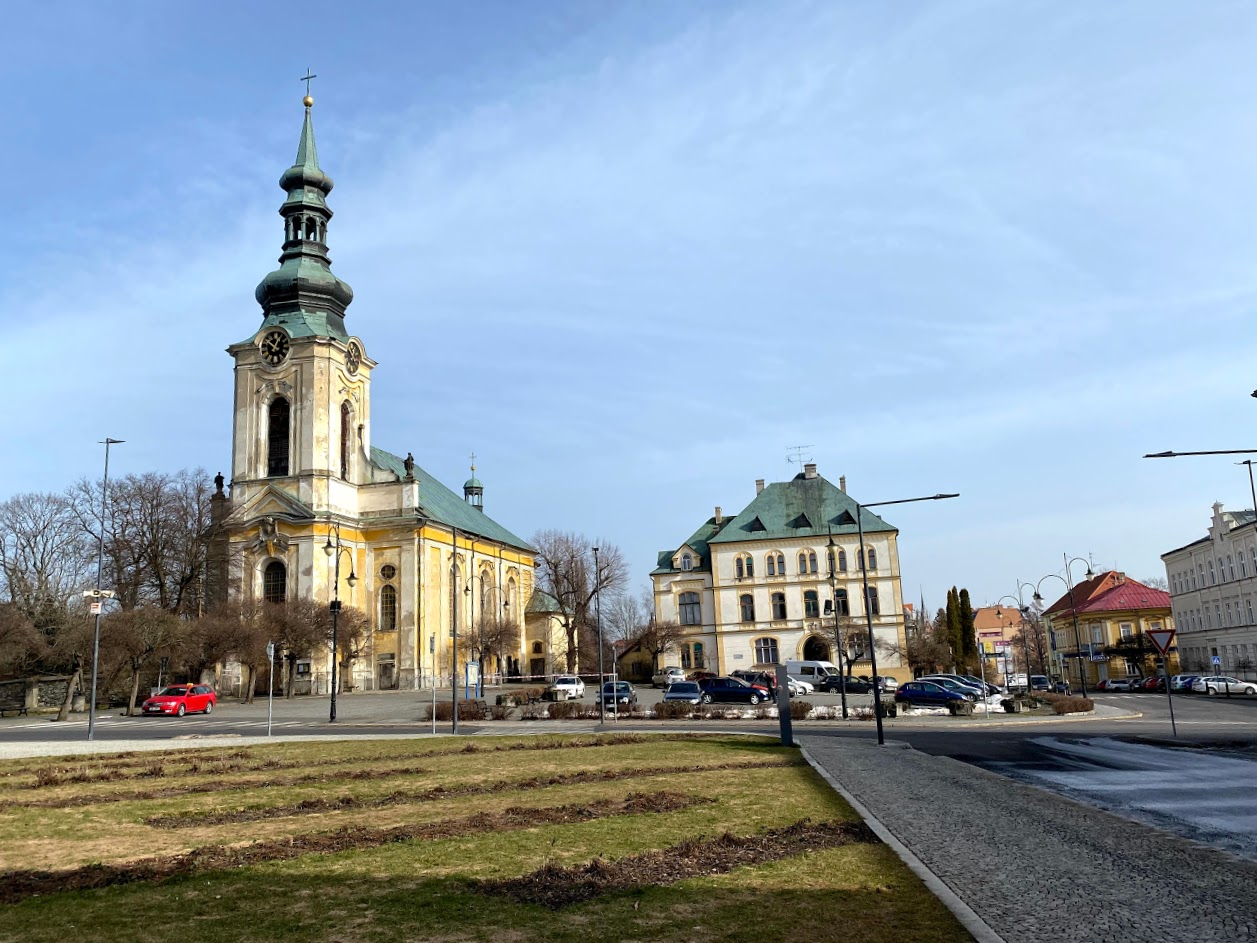
Church of Saints Peter and Paul on the square Náměstí E. Beneše

Varnsdorf is home to the Town Theatre Varnsdorf. The theatre building includes an art gallery.

== Sport ==
The town is home to the football club FK Varnsdorf. Until its relegation in 2025, the club played in the Czech National Football League.

== Sights ==
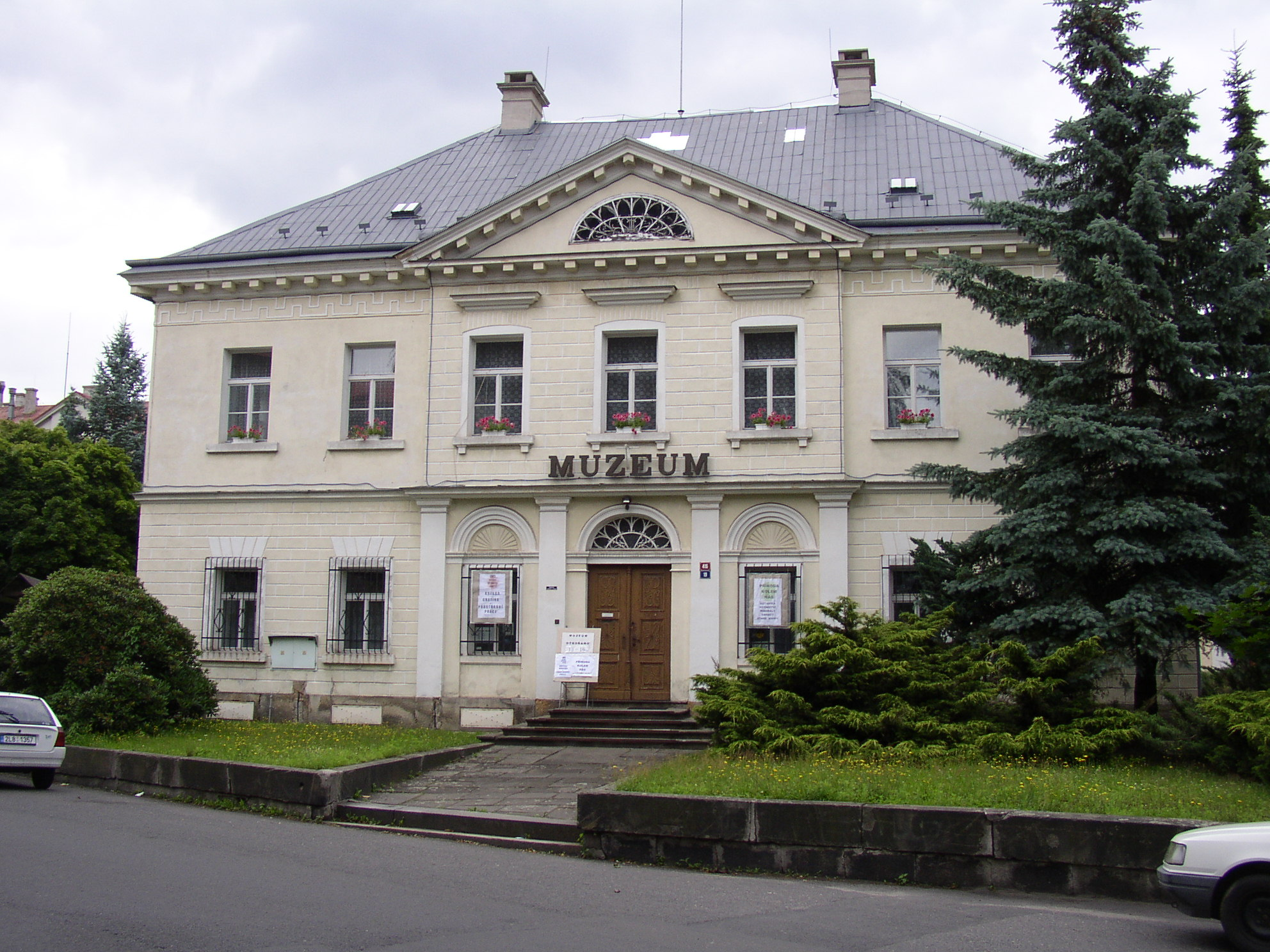
Varnsdorf Museum

There are several churches in Varnsdorf. The Church of Saints Peter and Paul is the oldest church in the town. It was built in 1774–1776 on the site of the original church from the 13th century. Its late Baroque decoration was finished in 1777.

The Church of Saint Francis of Assisi is located in Studánka. It was built in the neo-Romanesque style in 1872. The Old Catholic Church was built in 1875. The neo-Gothic Evangelical church (so-called "Red Church") was built in 1905. The Church of Saint Charles Borromeo was finished in 1912.

Other sights include various Art Nouveau and Neo-Renaissance buildings in the town and Varnsdorf Museum.

== Notable people ==
- Joseph Schubert (1754–1837), German composer, violinist and violist
- Heinrich Brandler (1881–1967), German politician and activist
- Gernot Zippe (1917–2008), Austrian mechanical engineer and nuclear physicist
- Peter Kien (1919–1944), poet
- Evelyn Opela (born 1945), German actress
- Josef Berger (born 1949), biologist
- Iva Ritschelová (1964–2017), economist and academic
