= List of the largest nuclear power stations in the United States =

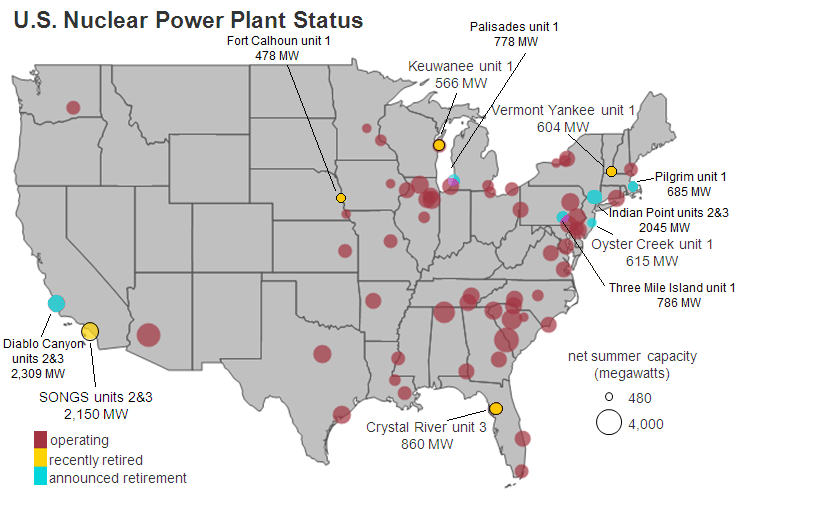
US nuclear power plants, highlighting recently and soon-to-be retired plants, as of 2013 (US EIA)

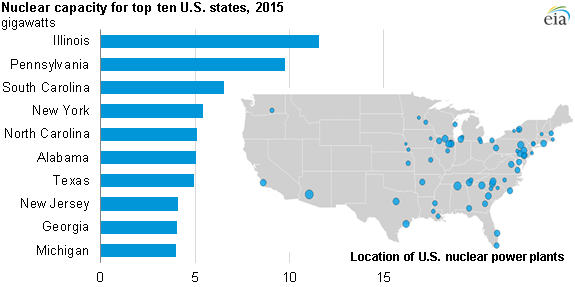
Nuclear power plant locations and nameplate capacity of the top 10 states in 2015

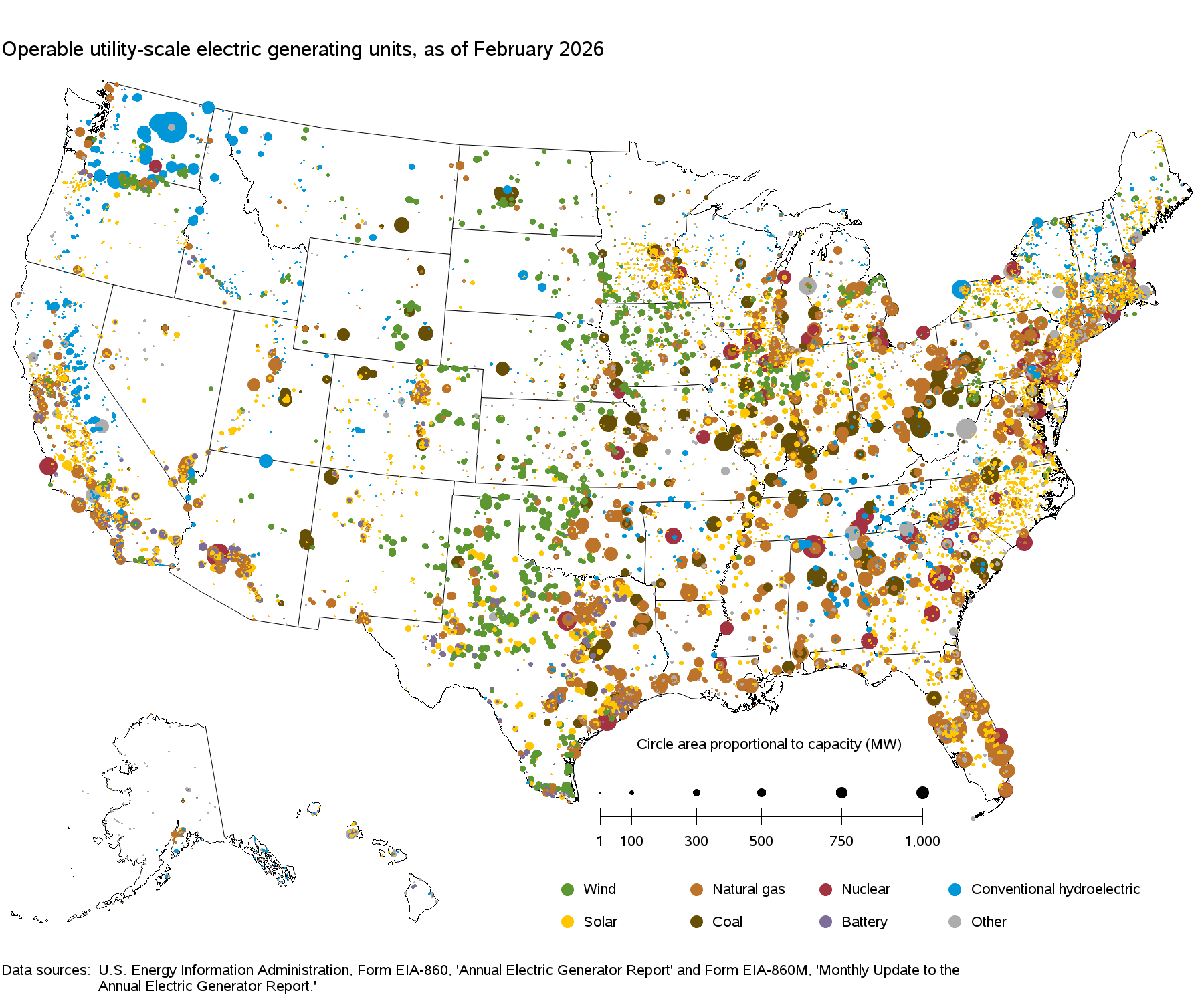
Power plants map, August 2016

This article lists the largest nuclear power stations in the United States, in terms of nameplate capacity.

Power station	# Units	Net capacity (MW_{e})	State	Location
Vogtle	4	4,664	Georgia	33°08′35″N 81°45′57″W
Palo Verde	3	3,937	Arizona	33°23′21″N 112°51′54″W
Browns Ferry	3	3,775	Alabama	34°42′14″N 87°07′07″W
South Texas	2	2,560	Texas	28°47′44″N 96°02′56″W
Oconee	3	2,538	South Carolina	34°47′38″N 82°53′53″W
Susquehanna	2	2,514	Pennsylvania	41°05′20″N 76°08′56″W
McGuire	2	2,430	North Carolina	35°25′57″N 80°56′54″W
Watts Bar	2	2,339	Tennessee	35°36′10″N 84°47′22″W
Sequoyah	2	2,317	Tennessee	35°13′35″N 85°05′30″W
Salem	2	2,304	New Jersey	39°27′46″N 75°32′08″W
Byron	2	2,300	Illinois	42°4′27″N 89°16′55″W
Limerick	2	2,264	Pennsylvania	40°13′36″N 75°35′14″W
Catawba	2	2,258	South Carolina	35°3′6″N 81°4′12″W
Braidwood	2	2,389	Illinois	41°14′37″N 88°13′45″W
Diablo Canyon	2	2,240	California	35°12′39″N 120°51′22″W
LaSalle	2	2,234	Illinois	41°14′44″N 88°40′9″W
Peach Bottom	2	2,224	Pennsylvania	39°45′30″N 76°16′05″W
Comanche Peak	2	2,208	Texas	32°17′54″N 97°47′06″W
Donald C. Cook	2	2,155	Michigan	41°58′31″N 86°33′57″W
Indian Point	3	2,083	New York	41°16′11″N 73°57′08″W
Millstone	2	2,037	Connecticut	41°18′43″N 72°10′07″W
Saint Lucie	2	2,004	Florida	27°20′55″N 80°14′47″W
Brunswick	2	1,980	North Carolina	33°57′30″N 78°0′37″W
Beaver Valley	2	1,890	Pennsylvania	40°37′24″N 80°25′50″W
Dresden	2	1,885	Illinois	41°23′23″N 88°16′5″W
Quad Cities	2	1,880	Illinois	41°43′35″N 90°18′36″W
Edwin I. Hatch	2	1,848	Georgia	31°56′03″N 82°20′38″W
North Anna	2	1,790	Virginia	38°03′38″N 77°47′22″W
Arkansas Nuclear One	2	1,776	Arkansas	35°18′37″N 93°13′53″W
Nine Mile Point	2	1,761	New York	43°31′15″N 76°24′25″W
Joseph M. Farley	2	1,757	Alabama	31°13′23″N 85°06′42″W
Calvert Cliffs	2	1,736	Maryland	38°25′55″N 76°26′32″W
Surry	2	1,598	Virginia	37°09′56″N 76°41′52″W
Grand Gulf	1	1,500	Mississippi	32°0′24″N 91°2′54″W
Turkey Point	5 (only 2 are nuclear-powered)	1,386	Florida	25°26′03″N 80°19′50″W
Callaway	1	1,300	Missouri	38°45′42″N 91°46′48″W
Perry	1	1,256	Ohio	41°48′03″N 81°08′36″W
Wolf Creek	1	1,250	Kansas	38°14′20″N 95°41′20″W
Seabrook	1	1,244	New Hampshire	42°53′56″N 70°51′03″W
Enrico Fermi	1	1,198	Michigan	41°57′46″N 83°15′27″W
Waterford	1	1,180	Louisiana	29°59′43″N 90°28′16″W
Columbia	1	1,170	Washington	46°28′16″N 119°20′02″W
Clinton	1	1,098	Illinois	40°10′20″N 88°50′06″W
Prairie Island	2	1,096	Minnesota	44°37′18″N 92°37′59″W
Hope Creek	1	1,240	New Jersey	39°28′04″N 75°32′17″W
Point Beach	2	1,026	Wisconsin	44°16′52″N 87°32′12″W

== See also ==
- List of largest power plants in the United States
- List of the largest coal power stations in the United States
- Largest hydroelectric power plants in the United States
- List of largest power stations in the world
- List of wind farms in the United States
- List of nuclear power stations
- Electricity sector of the United States
