= Joseph Schubert (composer) =

German composer, violinist, and violist (1754–1837)

- Born: December 20, 1754; Varnsdorf, Bohemia (now Czech Republic)
- Died: July 28, 1837 (aged 82) Dresden, Saxony
- Occupations: Composer, violinist, violist
- Instruments: Violin, viola
- Years active: 1770s–1837

Joseph Schubert (20 December 1754 – 28 July 1837) was a German composer, violinist, and violist.

Schubert was born in Varnsdorf, Bohemia (now Czech Republic) to a musical family. He received his early musical education from his father, who was a cantor, and then in Prague. In 1778, he moved to Berlin to study the violin with Paul Kohn, director of the royal orchestra there.

In 1779, Schubert obtained a position as violinist in the court of Heinrich Friedrich, the Margrave of Brandenburg-Schwedt. In 1788, he accepted a post as violist in the court orchestra of Dresden, where he remained until his death in 1837.

Schubert gained recognition as a versatile composer, cited in the 1812 edition of Ernst Ludwig Gerber's lexicon of composers. His œuvre includes 15 masses, 4 operas, 17 sonatas, and 49 concertos for solo instruments. The Saxon State Library in Dresden holds the manuscripts of three viola concertos attributed to him.

== Published works ==
- Concerto for Viola and Orchestra in C major (Schott Music, ed. Karlheinz Schultz-Hauser)
