= Josef Berger (scientist) =

Czech biologist, informatician and university educator

- Born: July 24, 1949; Varnsdorf, Czechoslovakia (now Czech Republic)
- Education: Charles University
- Occupations: Scientist; professor
- Employer: University of South Bohemia
- Known for: Biomodel development; information gaining; Czech university ranking (2007)
- Children: 2 sons

Josef Berger (born 24 July 1949 in Varnsdorf) is a Czech scientist. He is a full professor at the University of South Bohemia, České Budějovice, Czech Republic. His areas are biomodel development and information gaining.

== Career ==
Berger is a graduate of the Charles University in Prague, Faculty of Science (MSc 1973, RNDr 1979, PhD 1984). He worked as a scientist and professor at the Institute for Pharmacy and Biochemistry, University Hospital in Hradec Králové, University of Pardubice, Masaryk University in Brno. He is a (co)author of 16 books, about 100 scientific papers (original articles and reviews), three hundred popular-science articles and the first Czech University ranking (2007). He prepared the strategy for the University Pardubice foundation (1989-1992), initiated the first Czech bachelor programme in clinical biology (University of Pardubice, 1992), the first Czech master programme in clinical biology (University of South Bohemia, 1998. He also was elected member of the main board of Czechoslovak Biological Society (1997-2000, 2000-2003, 2003–2006) and the Editor-in-Chief of the international Journal of Applied Biomedicine.

== Personal life ==
Berger is married with two sons.

== Bibliography ==
=== Selected books ===
- J. Berger: Informatika v klinické praxi pro lékaře a klinické biology. Grada/Avicenum 1993. ISBN 80-85623-78-1.
- J. Berger: Advances in Cell and Molecular Biology. Kopp Publ. 2005. ISBN 80-7232-263-X.
