= The Journal of Applied Behavioral Science =

- Discipline: Psychology
- Language: English
- Edited by: Gavin Schwarz

Publication details
- History: 1965-present
- Publisher: SAGE Publications on behalf of the National Training Laboratories
- Frequency: Quarterly
- Impact factor: 3.5 (2022)

Standard abbreviations
- ISO 4: J. Appl. Behav. Sci.

Indexing
- ISSN: 0021-8863 (print); 1552-6879 (web)
- LCCN: 65009877
- OCLC no.: 67030138

Links
- Journal homepage; Online access; Online archive

The Journal of Applied Behavioral Science is a quarterly peer-reviewed academic journal covering the psychology of groups and organizations. Its editor-in-chief is Gavin Schwarz (University of New South Wales). It was established 1965 and is published by SAGE Publications in association with the National Training Laboratories.

== Abstracting and indexing ==
The journal is abstracted and indexed in Scopus and the Social Sciences Citation Index. According to the Journal Citation Reports, its 2022 impact factor is 3.5.
