= T-groups =

Form of group training

A T-group or training group (sometimes also referred to as sensitivity-training group, human relations training group or encounter group) is a form of group training where participants (typically between eight and fifteen people) learn about themselves (and about small group processes in general) through their interaction with each other. They use feedback, problem solving, and role play to gain insights into themselves, others, and groups.

Experimental studies have been undertaken with the aim of determining what effects, if any, participating in a T-group has on the participants. For example, a 1975 article by Nancy E. Adler and Daniel Goleman concluded that "Students who had participated in a T-group showed significantly more change toward their selected goal than those who had not." Carl Rogers described sensitivity training groups as "...the most significant social invention of the century".

== Concept ==
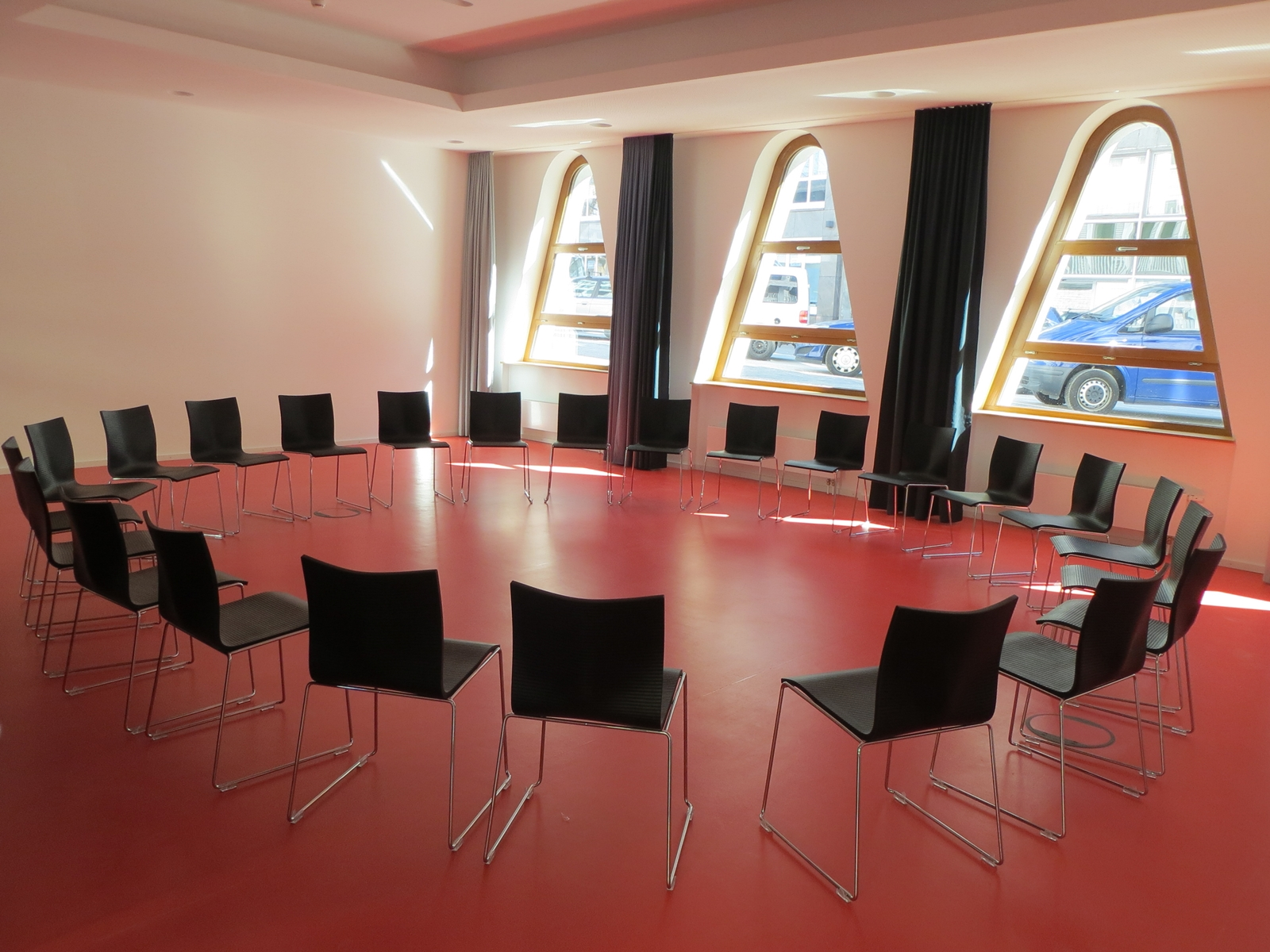
An encounter circle may be one way of carrying out a T-group meeting

The concept of encounter as "a meeting of two, eye to eye, face to face," was articulated by J.L. Moreno in Vienna in 1914–15, in his "Einladung zu einer Begegnung" ("Invitation to an Encounter"), maturing into his psychodrama therapy. It was pioneered in the mid-1940s by Moreno's protege Kurt Lewin and his colleagues as a method of learning about human behavior in what became the National Training Laboratories (also known as the NTL Institute) that was created by the Office of Naval Research and the National Education Association in Bethel, Maine, in 1947. First conceived as a research technique with a goal to change the standards, attitudes and behavior of individuals, the T-group evolved into educational and treatment schemes for non-psychiatric patient people.

A T-group meeting does not have an explicit agenda, structure, or expressed goal. Under the guidance of a facilitator, the participants are encouraged to share emotional reactions (for example, anger, fear, warmth, or envy) that arise in response to their fellow participants' actions and statements. The emphasis is on sharing emotions, as opposed to judgments or conclusions. In this way, T-group participants can learn how their words and actions trigger emotional responses in the people they communicate with.

=== Group types ===
There are a number of group types.

- Task groups focus on the here and now, involving learning through doing, activity and processing; and involves daily living skills and work skills.
- Evaluative groups focus on evaluating the skills, behaviors, needs, and functions of a group and is the first step in a group process.
- Topical discussion groups focus on a common topic that can be shared by all the members to encourage involvement.
- Developmental groups encourage the members to develop sequentially organized social interaction skills with the other members.
  1. Parallel groups are made up of clients doing individual tasks side by side.
    1. Project groups emphasize task accomplishment. Some interaction may be built in, such as shared materials and tools and sharing the work.
    2. Egocentric cooperative groups require the members to select and implement the task. Tasks are longer term and socialization is required.
  2. Cooperative groups require the therapist only as an advisor. Members are encouraged to identify and gratify each other's social and emotional needs in conjunction with task accomplishment. The task in a cooperative group may be secondary to social aspects.
  3. Mature groups involve the therapist as a co-equal member. The group members take on all leadership roles in order to balance task accomplishment with need satisfaction of the members.
- Self-help groups are supportive and educational, and focus on personal growth around a single major life disrupting problem (for example, Alcoholics Anonymous).
- Support groups focus on helping others in a crisis and continue to do so until the crisis is gone and is usually before the self-help group.
- Advocacy groups focus on changing others or changing the system, rather than changing one's self: "getting one from point A to point B".
- Psychotherapy groups focus on helping individuals in the present that have past conflicts which affect their behavior.

== Variations ==
Many varieties of T-groups have existed, from the initial T-groups that focused on small group dynamics, to those that aim more explicitly to develop self-understanding and interpersonal communication. Industry also widely used T-groups, particularly in the 1960s and 1970s, and in many ways these were predecessors of current team building and corporate culture initiatives.

A current T-group version that addresses the issue of openness is the "Tough Stuff™" workshop of Robert P. Crosby and his associates. Crosby trainers carefully focus the group on their experience of their immediate interactions and group dynamics, and away from openness in the form of personal stories. Applying the behavioral communication model of John L. Wallen, The Interpersonal Gap, the participants are given a structure for talking about and learning from their interactions. The Crosby T-group also puts much of the feedback task in the hands of the participants. Using Wallen's model and behavioral skills, the participants are encouraged to give and receive feedback throughout the process, both while they are in the T-group, and in other reflective and skill building activities. Crosby was first a T-group participant in 1953, and was mentored by Lewin associates Ken Benne, Leland Bradford and Ronald Lippitt. Crosby, worked closely with Mr. Wallen from 1968 to 1975, co-leading several National Training Laboratories T-groups during that time. When Crosby founded the Leadership Institute of Seattle (LIOS) Applied Behavioral Science Graduate Program he made T-groups a core requirement of the curriculum, and he did the same when founding and leading the ALCOA Corporate leadership program from 1990 to 2005. Throughout Crosby's Organization Development career he has used T-groups in numerous business culture change and performance improvement initiatives, most famously during the PECO Nuclear turnaround following the shutdown of Peach Bottom Atomic Power Station for human performance issues by the Nuclear Regulatory Commission in 1987. Crosby and his associates still lead T-groups in public workshops and in businesses.

Another recent version of the T-groups is the Appreciative Inquiry Human Interaction Laboratory, which focuses on strengths-based learning processes. It is a variation of the NTL T-groups, since it shares the values and experiential learning model with the classic T-groups.

A commercialized strand of the encounter group movement developed into large-group awareness training. Other variations popular in the late 1960s and early 1970s included the nude encounter group, where participants are naked, and the marathon encounter group, where participants carry on for 24 hours or longer without sleep. "Encounter groups, in contrast to T-groups, are far less concerned with group dynamics. Instead, they focus on the individual, on getting each group participant to talk about and express his feelings as deeply and spontaneously as possible."

== Controversial aspects ==
This type of training is controversial as the behaviors it encourages are often self-disclosure and openness, which many people believe some organizations ultimately punish. The feedback used in this type of training can be highly personal, hence it must be given by highly trained observers (trainers).. In the NTL-tradition, the T-group is always embedded in a Human Interaction Laboratory, with reflection time and theory sessions. In these sessions, the participants have the opportunity to make sense of what's happening in the T-group.

Encounter groups are also controversial because of scientific claims that they can cause serious and lasting psychological damage. One 1971 study found that 9% of normal college students participating in an encounter group developed psychological problems lasting at least six months after their experience. The most dangerous groups had authoritarian and charismatic leaders who used vicious emotional attacks and public humiliation to try to break participants. However, a peer-reviewed review of studies published in 1975 concluded that "No study yet published provides a basis for concluding that adverse effects arising from sensitivity training are any more frequent than adverse effects arising in equivalent populations not in groups".

== See also ==
- Appreciative inquiry
- Focusing (psychotherapy)
- Four-sides model
- Improvisation
- Learning circle
- Nonviolent communication
