= Buddhism in the Czech Republic =

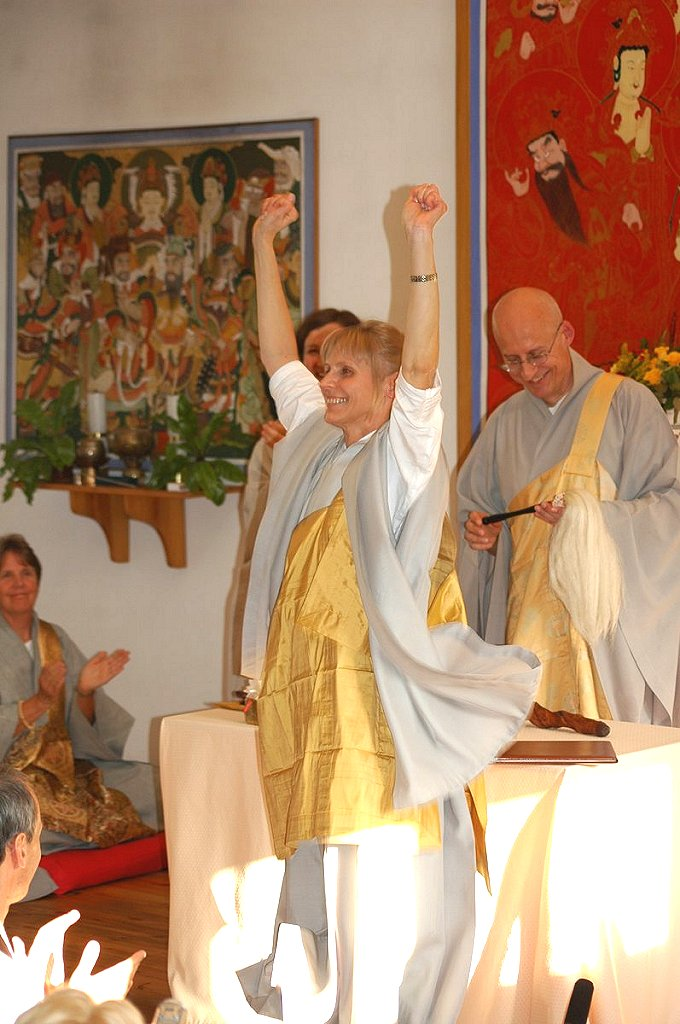
Czech Buddhists

With a rough estimate of 6100 Buddhists, Buddhism is practiced by around 0.05% of the Czech population. The World Buddhist Directory lists 70 Buddhist places in the Czech Republic.

The Vietnamese-speaking communities form the mainstay of the Buddhist population in the Czech Republic. The Vietnamese practice mainly Mahayana Buddhism with some syncretism of ancestor worship, Confucianism and Taoism. They represent roughly from two thirds to three quarters of the Buddhist community alongside being the largest Asian community in the Czech Republic, numbering over 60,000. The remainder consists of a significant number of Czechs who have converted (mainly to Theravada or Vajrayana Buddhism) and the smaller communities of overseas Chinese and Koreans.

Buddhism is found mainly where the Vietnamese-speaking people reside, notably in the cities of Prague and Cheb. Thien An Buddhist Pagoda in the northern province of Varnsdorf was the first Vietnamese style temple to be consecrated in the Czech Republic, in January 2008. The pagoda was completed in September 2007 and now serves as a center of Vietnamese culture and teaching Vietnamese language. There are also ten Korean Buddhist temples in the Czech Republic, with three each in Prague and Brno.

The Vajrayana practitioners are mainly centered on the Nyingma and Kagyu schools. The Karma Kagyu tradition has established about 50 centers and meditation groups. The Diamond Way tradition of Vajrayana Buddhism, founded and directed by Ole Nydahl is active in both the Czech Republic and Slovakia.

== History ==
2011 Population Census, Karma Kagyu Lineage Diamond Way Buddhism, Age Structure

Buddhism came to the Czech Republic around 1920. At this time, the West Mongolian nation of the Kalmyks arrived in Czechoslovakia. They were soon forced to leave the republic, because the government was not inclined to such religious practices. With this act, Czechoslovakia delayed the spread of the Buddhist faith by 40 years compared to Western countries.Leopold Procházka, Fráňa Drtikol, Eduard and Míla Tomášová, and Květoslav Minařík can be considered the leading popularizers of Buddhism in Czechoslovakia in the 20th century. After the fall of communism in 1989, people felt the loss of spiritual values, because until then they lived mainly in a materialistic way. This too could have been the reason for the increased interest in Buddhism after the Velvet Revolution.

== Culture ==
In mid-January 2022, the Buddha close-up exhibition was opened in the National Gallery in Prague. Using medallions of individual practitioners in the form of videos, individual schools operating in the Czech Republic are presented.

== See also ==
- Vietnamese people in the Czech Republic
- Demographics of the Czech Republic
