= Peach Bottom Nuclear Generating Station =

Nuclear power plant in Pennsylvania

Peach Bottom Atomic Power Station
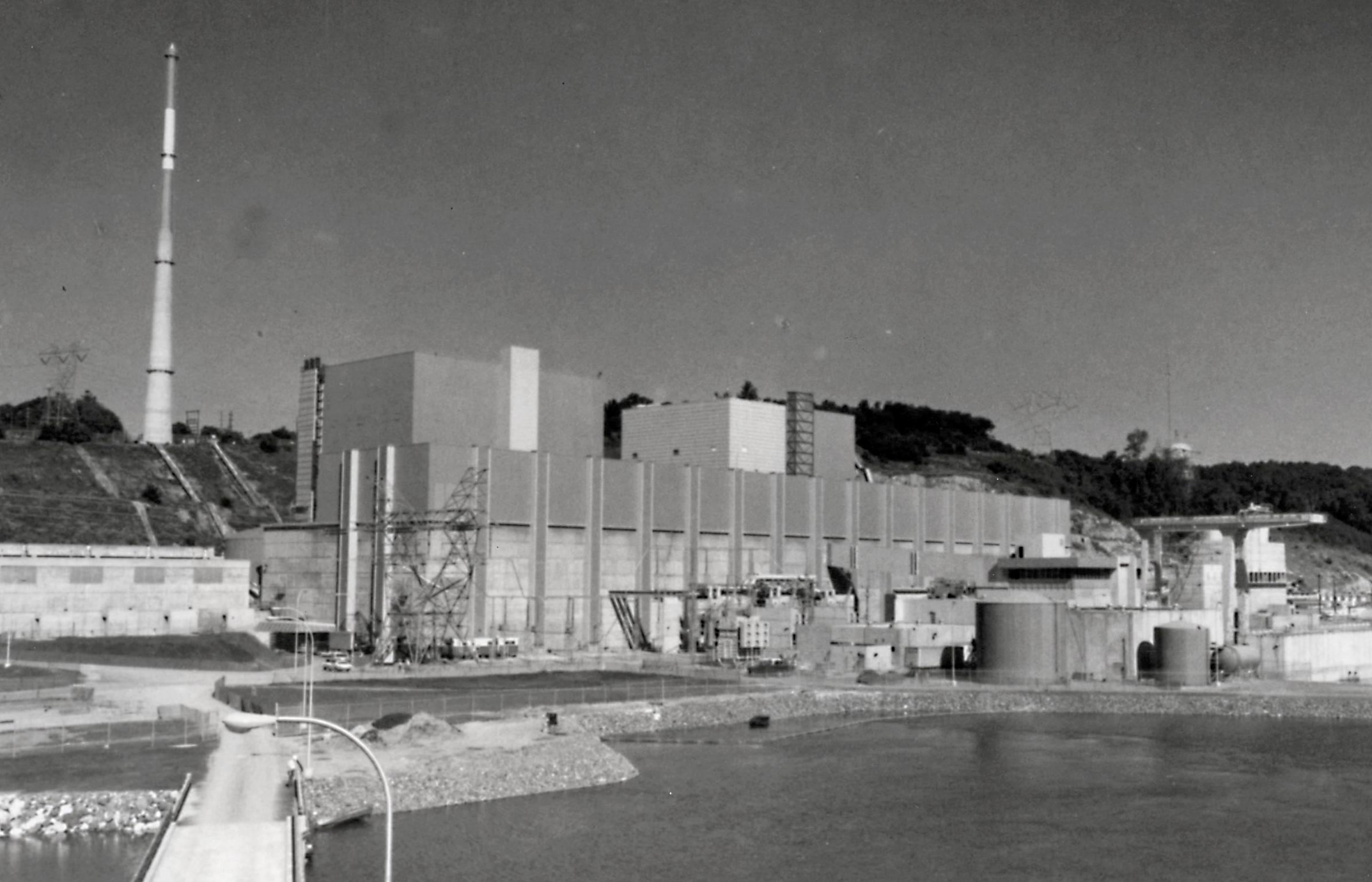
- Photo of Units 2 and 3 c. 1974
- Country: United States
- Location: Delta, York County, Pennsylvania
- Coordinates: 39°45′30″N 76°16′5″W
- Status: Operational
- Construction began: Unit 1: February 1, 1962; Units 2–3: January 31, 1968
- Commission date: Unit 1: June 1, 1967; Unit 2: July 5, 1974; Unit 3: December 23, 1974
- Decommission date: Unit 1: November 1, 1974
- Construction cost: $2.943 billion (2007 USD)
- Owners: Unit 1: Constellation Energy; Units 2–3: Constellation Energy (50%), PSEG (50%)
- Operator: Constellation Energy

Nuclear power station
- Reactor type: Unit 1: HTGR; Units 2–3: BWR
- Reactor supplier: Unit 1: General Atomics; Units 2–3: General Electric
- Cooling towers: 3 × Mechanical Draft (supplemental only)
- Cooling source: Susquehanna River
- Thermal capacity: 1 × 115 MW_{th} (decommissioned); 2 × 3951 MW_{th}

Power generation
- Units operational: 1 × 1308 MW; 1 × 1309 MW
- Make and model: Unit 1: Prototype; Units 2–3: BWR-4 (Mark 1)
- Units decommissioned: 1 × 40 MW
- Nameplate capacity: 2617 MW
- Capacity factor: 94.81% (2017); 76.90% (lifetime)
- Annual net output: 22,268 GWh (2021)

External links
- Website: Peach Bottom Atomic Power Station
- Commons: Related media on Commons

The Peach Bottom Atomic Power Station, branded as the Peach Bottom Clean Energy Center, is an American nuclear power plant that is located 35 miles (56 km) northeast of Baltimore and 50 miles (80 km) southeast of Harrisburg in Peach Bottom Township, York County, Pennsylvania. Situated close to the Susquehanna River, it is three miles north of the Maryland border.

== History ==
The Philadelphia Electric Company (later "PECO") was a pioneer in the commercial nuclear industry when it ordered Peach Bottom Unit 1 in 1958. The U.S.'s first nuclear power plant (the Shippingport Atomic Power Station) had gone on-line a year earlier. Peach Bottom Unit 1 was an experimental helium-cooled, graphite-moderated reactor. The reactor was fueled by a mixed ^{232}Th-^{235}U fuel. It operated from 1966 to 1974. Peach Bottom Units 2 and 3, General Electric boiling water reactors, went on-line in 1974, and are still in operation on the 620-acre (2.5 km^{2}) site today. Both Units 2 and 3, originally rated at 3,514 megawatts thermal (MW_{th}), equivalent to about 1,180 megawatts of electricity (MW_{e}) each, were uprated to 4,016 megawatts thermal (MW_{th}), equivalent to about 1,382 megawatts net of electricity (MW_{e}) each in 2018. Units 2 and 3 were originally licensed to operate until 2013 and 2014, respectively. Their licenses were extended until 2033 and 2034 and then, in 2020 they were extended to 2053 and 2054.

Peach Bottom is currently operated by Constellation Energy (formerly a division of PECO's parent company, Exelon, and before that it was known as Baltimore Gas and Electric (BG&E), the oldest gas utility in the country) and is jointly owned by Constellation (50%) and Public Service Enterprise Group (PSEG) Power LLC (formerly Public Service Electric and Gas) (50%).

Peach Bottom was one of the plants analyzed in the NUREG-1150 safety analysis study.

== Electricity production ==
Generation (MWh) of Peach Bottom Nuclear Generating Station
Year	Jan	Feb	Mar	Apr	May	Jun	Jul	Aug	Sep	Oct	Nov	Dec	Annual (Total)
2001	1,664,626	1,472,202	1,670,642	1,614,240	1,634,425	1,556,160	1,437,853	1,373,333	1,032,388	1,197,096	1,594,095	1,646,619	17,893,679
2002	1,611,096	1,502,169	1,631,352	1,608,685	1,650,900	1,591,210	1,618,222	1,550,246	992,940	1,567,018	1,623,340	1,539,148	18,486,326
2003	1,678,488	1,467,100	1,690,062	1,568,558	1,548,152	1,620,856	1,510,658	1,632,360	863,614	1,316,151	1,644,917	1,643,804	18,184,720
2004	1,698,569	1,475,988	1,695,892	1,629,694	1,670,367	1,617,596	1,659,213	1,612,699	1,154,476	1,396,575	1,644,485	1,563,827	18,819,381
2005	1,674,690	1,398,795	1,645,670	1,632,476	1,648,942	1,598,503	1,554,916	1,596,322	1,101,005	1,203,077	1,640,015	1,699,039	18,393,450
2006	1,665,319	1,534,525	1,697,491	1,635,262	1,646,452	1,615,009	1,642,621	1,611,988	1,152,794	1,394,900	1,640,511	1,695,805	18,932,677
2007	1,689,888	1,511,891	1,688,236	1,624,237	1,673,642	1,611,518	1,651,388	1,607,209	1,271,760	1,224,953	1,645,705	1,698,295	18,898,722
2008	1,687,531	1,473,574	1,696,857	1,636,080	1,667,933	1,612,531	1,631,312	1,567,732	1,096,725	1,116,824	1,647,421	1,700,263	18,534,783
2009	1,475,861	1,521,316	1,659,915	1,626,902	1,669,790	1,618,891	1,660,211	1,610,510	1,095,254	1,321,688	1,652,511	1,696,980	18,609,829
2010	1,669,745	1,510,824	1,693,816	1,643,884	1,658,594	1,621,294	1,650,172	1,599,740	1,076,368	1,444,535	1,486,439	1,703,970	18,759,381
2011	1,688,092	1,538,951	1,699,432	1,634,743	1,675,131	1,620,931	1,643,404	1,581,960	1,055,235	1,273,617	1,678,069	1,735,372	18,824,937
2012	1,716,202	1,623,887	1,727,163	1,667,514	1,671,647	1,613,516	1,615,369	1,526,380	996,335	1,176,966	1,706,994	1,764,049	18,806,022
2013	1,753,160	1,586,736	1,757,394	1,719,406	1,711,012	1,627,018	1,639,108	1,570,377	971,377	1,028,179	1,702,881	1,767,884	18,834,532
2014	1,764,732	1,535,556	1,745,261	1,701,002	1,710,822	1,637,638	1,662,359	1,669,483	1,570,931	1,300,486	845,627	1,627,272	18,771,169
2015	1,738,500	1,521,627	1,726,289	1,740,198	1,777,697	1,705,492	1,752,571	1,683,650	1,352,070	1,204,949	1,811,530	1,843,729	19,858,302
2016	1,973,770	1,840,909	1,961,836	1,874,377	1,913,055	1,786,221	1,849,729	1,815,094	1,759,409	1,577,149	1,546,878	1,977,008	21,875,435
2017	1,937,962	1,773,025	1,972,031	1,892,130	1,798,344	1,841,185	1,870,889	1,841,939	1,705,062	1,474,115	1,663,753	1,952,108	21,722,543
2018	1,993,215	1,775,644	1,959,427	1,895,427	1,975,987	1,813,495	1,869,074	1,897,741	1,585,072	974,012	1,938,325	2,002,697	21,680,116
2019	2,002,859	1,809,685	2,001,340	1,927,258	1,974,532	1,870,469	1,886,773	1,863,973	1,754,960	1,479,158	1,729,059	1,994,319	22,294,385
2020	2,004,994	1,876,623	1,984,657	1,934,403	1,967,831	1,855,918	1,871,962	1,826,635	1,700,914	1,394,277	1,416,054	1,958,066	21,792,334
2021	2,002,793	1,786,510	1,998,255	1,922,903	1,921,720	1,860,860	1,895,146	1,873,639	1,771,548	1,573,523	1,657,609	2,003,738	22,268,244
2022	2,000,038	1,806,696	1,980,295	1,930,149	1,850,321	1,859,721	1,861,234	1,825,082	1,755,487	1,406,088	1,913,010	1,995,682	22,183,803
2023	1,982,664	1,800,032	1,989,076	1,907,233	1,951,871	1,850,361	1,870,105	1,839,176	1,702,405	1,347,329	1,927,943	1,995,878	22,164,093
2024	1,902,289	1,859,725	1,965,241	1,908,087	1,910,618	1,833,236	1,614,906	1,878,974	1,767,490	1,470,730	1,725,494	2,002,071	21,838,861
2025	1,995,892	1,809,984	1,977,042	1,887,205	1,947,450	1,846,034	1,878,203	1,845,957	1,705,319	1,250,911	1,797,838	2,002,173	21,944,008
2026	2,000,868	1,807,737	1,985,254	1,914,856	1,929,519	1,825,505	1,857,330	1,861,899					--

== Surrounding population ==
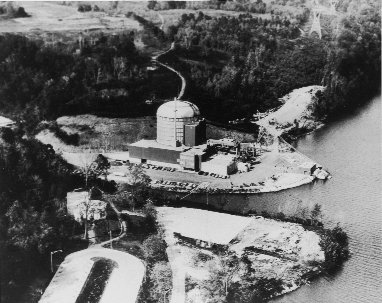
Photo of Peach Bottom Unit 1

The Nuclear Regulatory Commission defines two emergency planning zones around nuclear power plants: a plume exposure pathway zone with a radius of 10 miles (16 km), concerned primarily with exposure to, and inhalation of, airborne radioactive contamination, and an ingestion pathway zone of about 50 miles (80 km), concerned primarily with ingestion of food and liquid contaminated by radioactivity.

The 2010 U.S. population within 10 miles (16 km) of Peach Bottom was 46,536, an increase of 7.2 percent in a decade, according to an analysis of U.S. Census data for msnbc.com. The 2010 U.S. population within 50 miles (80 km) was 5,526,343, an increase of 10.6 percent since 2000. Cities within 50 miles include Baltimore (36 miles to city center).

Cities within 50 miles:

- Pennsylvania
  - Harrisburg (Capital) (48 mi/78 km)
- Maryland
  - Baltimore (37 mi/60 km)
- Delaware
  - Wilmington (38 mi/61 km)

== Safety concerns ==
In 1987, PECO was ordered by the Nuclear Regulatory Commission (NRC) to indefinitely shutdown Peach Bottom-2 and -3 on March 31 due to operator misconduct, corporate malfeasance, and blatant disregard for the health and safety of the area..

Among the incidents cited by the NRC: security guards were overworked, one guard was found asleep on the job, 36,000 gallons of "mildly radioactive water" leaked into the Susquehanna River, PECO mislaid data on radioactive waste classification causing misclassification of a waste shipment, and a major fire occurred in the maintenance cage of the Unit 3 turbine building on March 4, 1987.

Blame was not simply placed on the operators. "Latent organizational weakness" was targeted by industry experts and regulators alike. INPO President Zack Pate came to the conclusion that "Major changes in the corporate culture at PECO are required." In September 1988, NRC Chairman Lando Zech told senior management officials of PECO, "Your operators certainly made mistakes, no question about that. Your corporate management problems are just as serious." Clearly, a culture characterized by low morale and apathy prevailed. By April 1988, this emphasis on mismanagement contributed to the President of PECO resigning as well as to the retirement of the CEO.

Robert P. Crosby became the primary Organization Development influence during the PECO Nuclear turnaround following the Peach Bottom shut down. He used The Interpersonal Gap model by John L. Wallen along with a unique T-group method known as Conflict Management (and later as Tough Stuff in other business applications) to speed culture change, and applied his own version of Daryl Conner's Sponsor Agent Target model to improving and shortening outage management.

By 1996, both Limerick and Peach Bottom were designated excellent by INPO, and given strong Systematic Assessment of Licensee Performance (SALP) ratings by the NRC.

In 1999, PECO Nuclear eliminated their Organization Development positions as part of cost cutting initiative.

In 2007, Kerry Beal videotaped Peach Bottom security guards sleeping on the job. Beal had previously tried to notify supervisors at Wackenhut Corp. and the US Nuclear Regulatory Commission.

== Seismic risk ==
The Nuclear Regulatory Commission's estimate of the risk each year of an earthquake intense enough to cause core damage to the reactor at Peach Bottom was 1 in 41,667; according to an NRC study published in August 2010.

== See also ==
- High-temperature gas-cooled reactor
- Exelon
- Nuclear reactor accidents in the United States
- Nuclear safety in the United States
- G4S Secure Solutions (formerly The Wackenhut Corporation)
- List of the largest nuclear power stations in the United States
