= Pivovar Kocour Varnsdorf =

Brewery in Varnsdorf, Czech Republic

Kocour
- Interactive map of Kocour
- Location: Varnsdorf, Czech Republic
- Coordinates: 50°55′6.782″N 14°36′15.616″E
- Opened: 2008
- Owner: Pivovar Kocour Varnsdorf s.r.o.
- Website: https://www.pivovar-kocour.cz/cz/

Active beers
| Name | Type |
| American Pale Ale | Pale Ale |
| English Pale Ale | Pale Ale |
| American India Pale Ale | India Pale Ale |
| Stout | Stout |
| Kocour 12° | Lager |

Seasonal beers
| Name | Type |
| V3 | Smoked beer |

Pivovar Kocour Varnsdorf was established in 2008 and is one of the few breweries in the Czech Republic to produce ale rather than just lager.

Kocour also collaborates with brewers around the world to produce special beers, such as the V3 Rauchbier - a collaboration between Kocour, Kaltenecker in Slovakia and a Hungarian craft brewer.
