= Browns Ferry Nuclear Plant =

Nuclear power plant located on Tennessee River, Alabama

Browns Ferry Nuclear Power Plant

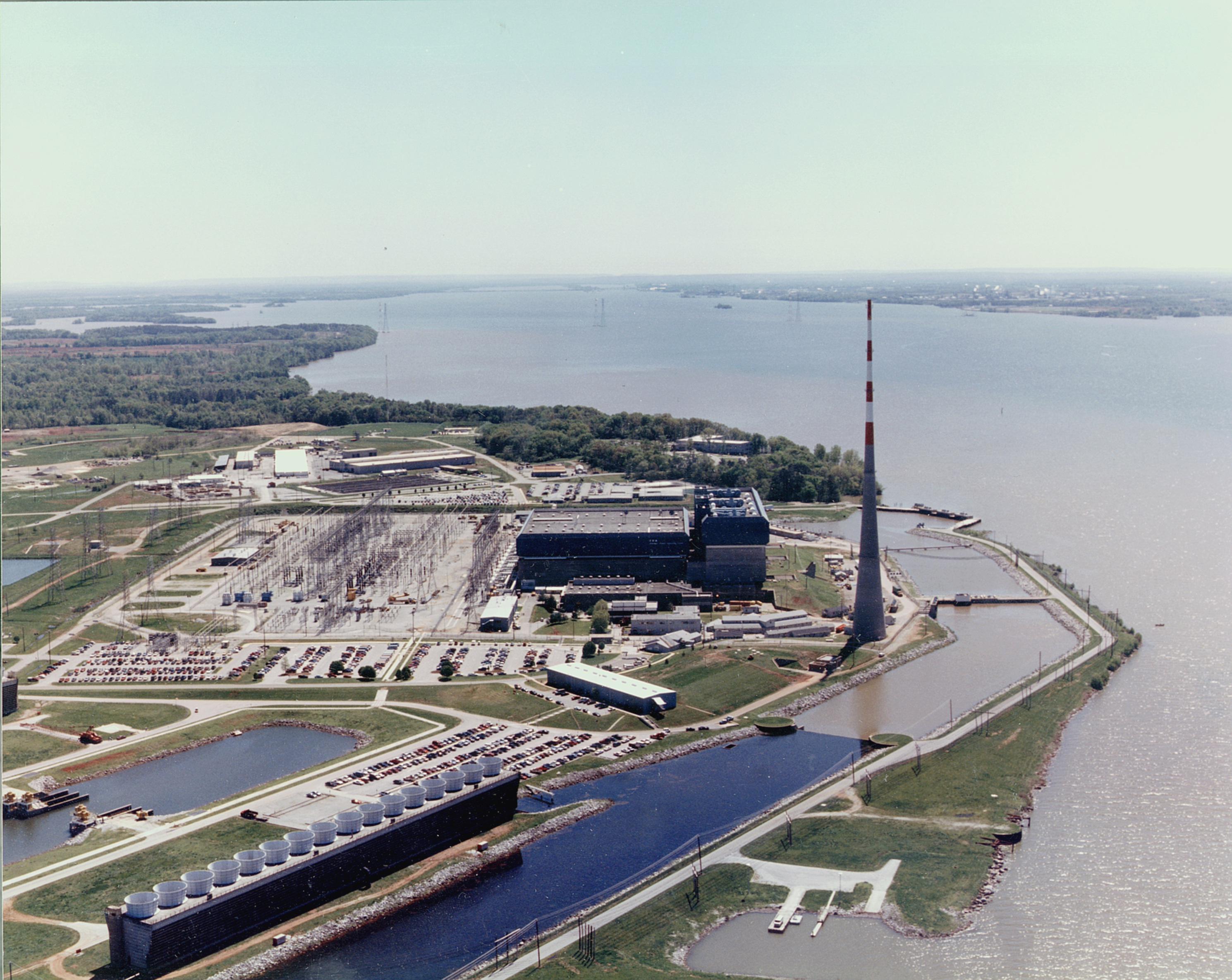
- Browns Ferry Nuclear Power Plant (NRC image)
- Country: United States
- Location: Athens, Limestone County, Alabama
- Coordinates: 34°42′14″N 87°7′7″W
- Status: Operational
- Construction began: Units 1–2: May 1, 1967; Unit 3: July 1, 1968
- Commission date: Unit 1: August 1, 1974; Unit 2: March 1, 1975; Unit 3: March 1, 1977
- Construction cost: $4.79 billion (2023 USD)
- Owner: Tennessee Valley Authority
- Operator: Tennessee Valley Authority

Nuclear power station
- Reactor type: BWR
- Reactor supplier: General Electric
- Cooling towers: 7 × Mechanical Draft (supplemental only) (Note: The plant is operated in an open-cycle mode of operation with up to seven additional mechanical draft "helper" cooling towers that are used as necessary in order to comply with regulations on discharge water temperature limits. One or more of the plant's units can also be derated (operated at a reduced power level) in order to maintain discharge water temperature within permitted limits, although this is only done as a last resort as it reduces revenues. The plant was designed to also be able to operate in a fully closed-cycle mode, but due to difficulties operating in this mode, it has not been used since at least 1991.)
- Cooling source: Wheeler Lake
- Thermal capacity: 3 × 3,952 MW_{th}

Power generation
- Units operational: 1 × 1,256 MW; 1 × 1,259 MW; 1 × 1,260 MW
- Make and model: BWR-4 (Mark 1)
- Nameplate capacity: 3,775 MW_{e}
- Capacity factor: 96.04% (2017); 78.07% (lifetime)
- Annual net output: 31,053 GWh (2021)

External links
- Website: Browns Ferry Nuclear Plant
- Commons: Related media on Commons

The Browns Ferry Nuclear Power Plant is located on the Tennessee River near Decatur and Athens, Alabama, on the north side (right bank) of Wheeler Lake. The site has three General Electric boiling water reactor (BWR) nuclear generating units and is owned entirely by the Tennessee Valley Authority (TVA). With a generating capacity of nearly 3.8 gigawatts, it is the third-most-powerful nuclear power plant in the United States, behind the Palo Verde Nuclear Power Plant in Arizona and the Vogtle Nuclear Power Plant in Georgia, and the most powerful generating station operated by TVA.

== History ==
The nuclear power plant is named after a ferry that operated at the site until the middle of the 20th century. Browns Ferry was TVA's first nuclear power plant; its approval occurred on June 17, 1966, and construction began in September 1966. In 1974, the time of its initial operation, it was the largest nuclear plant in the world. It was the first nuclear plant to use units capable of generating more than one gigawatt of power. The lake provides main cooling, and seven additional mechanical-draft "helper" cooling towers assist during limitations on water temperature. The 600-foot-tall (180 m) concrete chimney vents gases.

In 2006, the Nuclear Regulatory Commission (NRC) renewed the licenses for all three reactors, extending their operation for an additional twenty years past their original 40-year licensing period.

TVA employs 1,500 people at the plant, making it the second-largest employer in Limestone County, Alabama, after only the Toyota-Mazda factory near Greenbrier.

During the January 2024 snowstorms, the Browns Ferry Plant reached its capacity of 3,954 MW, and was serving 2 million customers within the Tennessee Valley area.

== Power uprates ==
On August 16, 2017, the NRC approved TVA's request for a 14.3% uprate of each reactor's output. Each unit's gross electrical output was 1,155 MW_{e} (1,101 MW_{e} net), but after power uprates during refueling outages in Fall 2018 for Unit 1, Spring 2019 for Unit 2, and Spring 2018 for Unit 3, the gross electrical output for each unit was increased to 1,310 MW_{e} (1,256 MW_{e} net). The uprate for Unit 3 was completed in July 2018, and in January 2019 for Unit 1. The final uprate, for Unit 2, was completed in August 2019, completing the $475 million project.

The electrical power increase of each unit was facilitated by the maximum operating thermal output of each reactor being increased from 3,458 MW_{th} to 3,952 MW_{th}.

== Electricity production ==
Generation (MWh) of Browns Ferry Nuclear Plant
Year	Jan	Feb	Mar	Apr	May	Jun	Jul	Aug	Sep	Oct	Nov	Dec	Annual (Total)
2001	1,667,851	1,491,373	1,242,131	858,030	1,661,829	1,604,300	1,588,001	1,649,106	1,609,700	1,687,338	1,637,830	1,499,258	18,196,747
2002	1,685,408	1,512,905	1,420,713	1,096,179	1,649,564	1,606,134	1,548,390	1,620,345	1,499,973	1,313,155	1,601,472	1,617,101	18,171,339
2003	1,532,983	1,128,827	1,025,450	1,585,491	1,679,977	1,309,029	1,533,262	1,645,966	1,604,957	1,537,308	1,421,201	1,690,504	17,694,955
2004	1,686,540	1,470,106	841,601	1,599,570	1,658,995	1,590,997	1,537,823	1,622,276	1,600,575	1,675,792	1,527,243	1,676,286	18,487,804
2005	1,675,267	1,348,879	1,295,379	1,113,629	1,660,128	1,553,197	1,608,386	1,561,362	1,504,885	1,631,346	1,335,128	1,668,300	17,955,886
2006	1,487,987	1,402,006	1,036,077	1,614,448	1,499,088	1,581,572	1,621,685	1,501,443	1,579,135	1,334,246	1,621,170	1,592,617	17,871,474
2007	1,560,924	1,022,936	831,703	1,021,159	1,650,880	2,045,566	2,372,923	1,991,492	2,088,068	2,256,012	2,070,380	2,315,217	21,227,260
2008	1,893,721	2,323,817	2,059,198	1,577,956	1,955,015	2,326,307	2,312,684	2,140,764	2,171,358	2,151,422	1,617,818	2,389,356	24,919,416
2009	2,495,915	1,773,377	2,085,348	2,219,185	1,637,825	1,664,921	2,391,731	2,279,194	2,106,496	2,188,309	2,422,544	2,477,782	25,742,627
2010	2,323,753	2,193,597	1,518,364	2,137,333	2,460,077	2,178,911	1,936,632	1,326,214	2,294,697	2,235,307	1,799,306	2,366,946	24,771,137
2011	2,355,215	2,200,794	1,678,032	1,898,038	295,548	2,313,208	2,365,264	2,257,444	2,289,458	2,449,347	2,448,450	2,374,074	24,924,872
2012	2,523,614	2,276,390	2,488,182	1,743,743	1,676,274	2,229,333	2,378,452	2,396,206	2,372,908	2,147,256	1,623,684	2,222,193	26,078,235
2013	2,492,365	1,802,735	1,705,836	1,619,918	2,347,845	2,353,628	2,419,741	2,421,309	2,351,218	2,480,664	2,318,275	2,404,579	26,718,113
2014	2,496,150	1,857,823	1,930,723	2,419,669	2,357,300	2,323,768	2,428,341	2,105,116	2,202,519	1,690,915	2,410,915	2,515,061	26,738,300
2015	2,522,630	2,275,914	1,980,313	2,050,289	2,418,863	2,353,346	2,402,549	2,390,292	2,281,649	2,498,807	2,256,646	2,238,396	27,669,694
2016	2,346,937	1,913,869	1,683,786	2,404,699	2,467,542	2,348,575	2,223,936	2,306,757	2,166,078	1,629,619	2,244,099	2,478,726	26,214,623
2017	2,361,245	1,959,361	1,663,795	2,372,881	2,474,116	2,356,377	2,440,385	2,371,276	2,391,880	2,498,096	2,428,665	2,529,802	27,847,879
2018	2,427,645	1,614,094	1,541,633	2,199,272	2,286,602	2,382,452	2,518,277	2,395,000	2,214,383	1,372,576	1,826,143	2,619,704	25,397,781
2019	2,677,940	2,351,969	1,645,879	2,278,510	2,693,784	2,608,289	2,619,186	2,681,415	2,339,956	2,509,767	2,332,120	2,781,085	29,519,900
2020	2,658,509	2,255,363	1,924,789	2,510,217	2,596,221	2,446,549	2,106,817	2,690,416	2,498,959	1,924,626	2,411,481	2,750,903	28,774,850
2021	2,783,476	2,418,303	1,887,703	1,986,456	2,801,025	2,663,214	2,758,676	2,733,946	2,683,156	2,823,124	2,735,754	2,778,719	31,053,552
2022	2,384,111	2,252,918	1,873,268	2,545,845	2,768,072	2,616,572	2,624,500	2,662,134	2,396,078	1,975,040	2,687,882	2,529,041	29,325,461
2023	2,743,612	2,045,599	2,072,567	2,393,573	2,645,017	2,635,230	2,677,374	2,673,932	2,607,559	2,788,151	2,724,619	2,813,277	30,820,510
2024	2,575,389	2,115,631	2,030,905	2,521,649	2,551,598	2,553,939	2,657,955	2,591,634	1,785,055	2,486,933	2,703,666	2,828,865	29,403,219
2025	2,797,566	1,796,510	1,786,861	2,249,956	2,455,188	2,475,604	2,657,304	2,423,115	2,658,297	2,803,108	2,736,875	2,824,692	29,665,076
2026	2,871,858	2,270,498	1,963,941	2,345,576	2,755,047	2,652,634	2,676,117	2,499,235					--

== Unit 1 ==
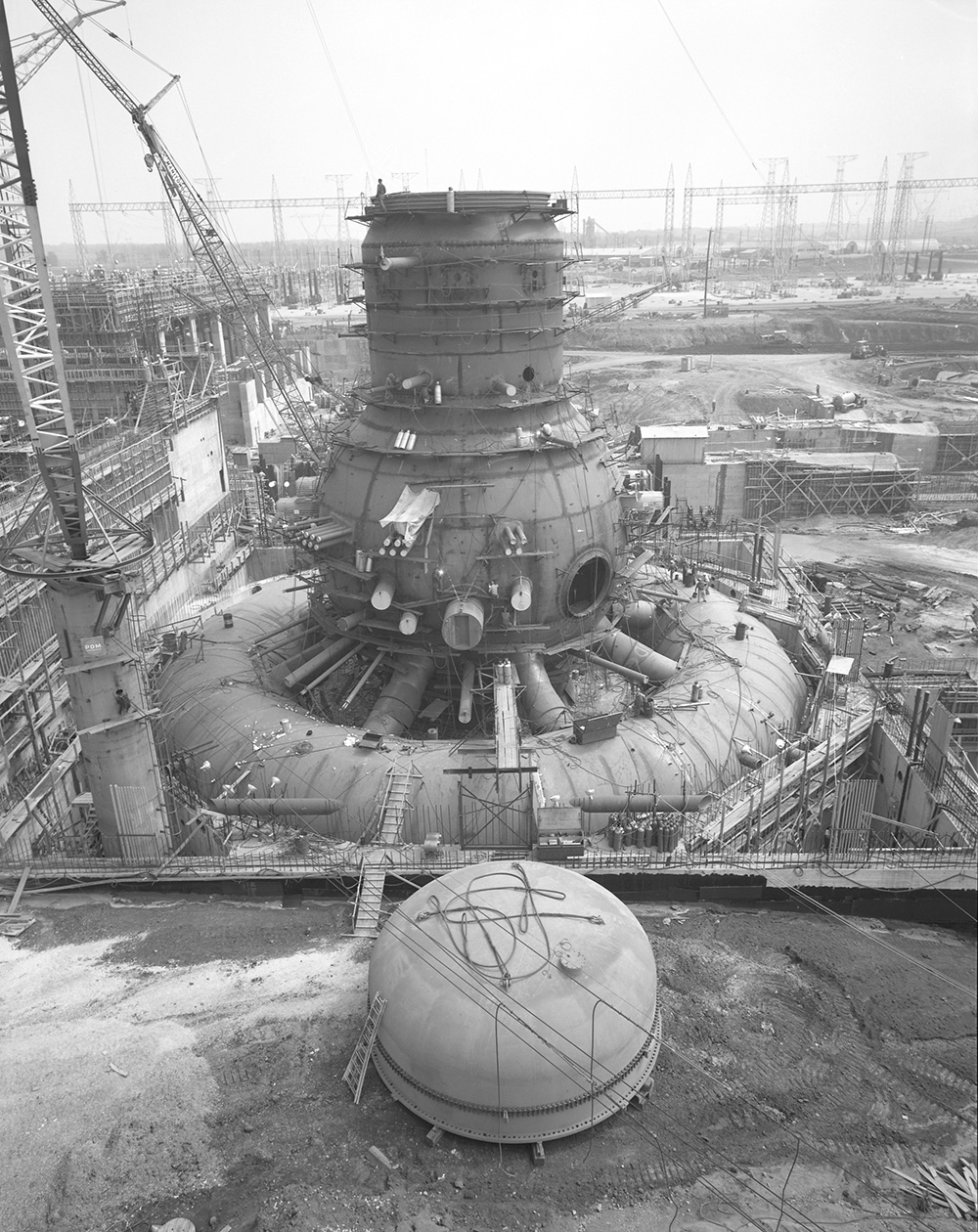
Unit 1 under construction

Unit 1 is a 1,256 MWe net BWR/4 built by General Electric. Construction started on Unit 1 on September 12, 1966, and first powered up for testing on December 20, 1973. Commercial operation began on August 1, 1974. It was licensed to operate through December 20, 2013. Unit 1 was shut down for a year after a fire in 1975 damaged the unit. The unit was subsequently repaired and operated from 1976 through March 3, 1985, when all three Browns Ferry units were shut down for operational and management issues.

Starting in 2002, TVA undertook an effort to restore Unit 1 to operational status, spending $1.8 billion USD to do so. The NRC approved the restart of Unit 1 on May 15, 2007, and the reactor was brought up to criticality on May 22. During initial testing after restart, on May 24, 2007, a leaky hydraulic control pipe in the turbine hall burst, spilling about 600 US gallons (2,300 L; 500 imp gal) of non-radioactive fluid, and the newly restarted reactor was temporarily powered down. Reactor power-up and tests resumed on May 27 and the unit started supplying power to the electric grid on June 2, 2007, reaching full power on June 8. The Browns Ferry restart was estimated to pay for itself in five years.

On May 4, 2006, NRC issued a renewed license, adding twenty years to operate through December 20, 2033.

Unit 1 generated 9,801 GWh of electricity in 2017, achieving a capacity factor of 101.62%.

=== Unit 1 fire ===
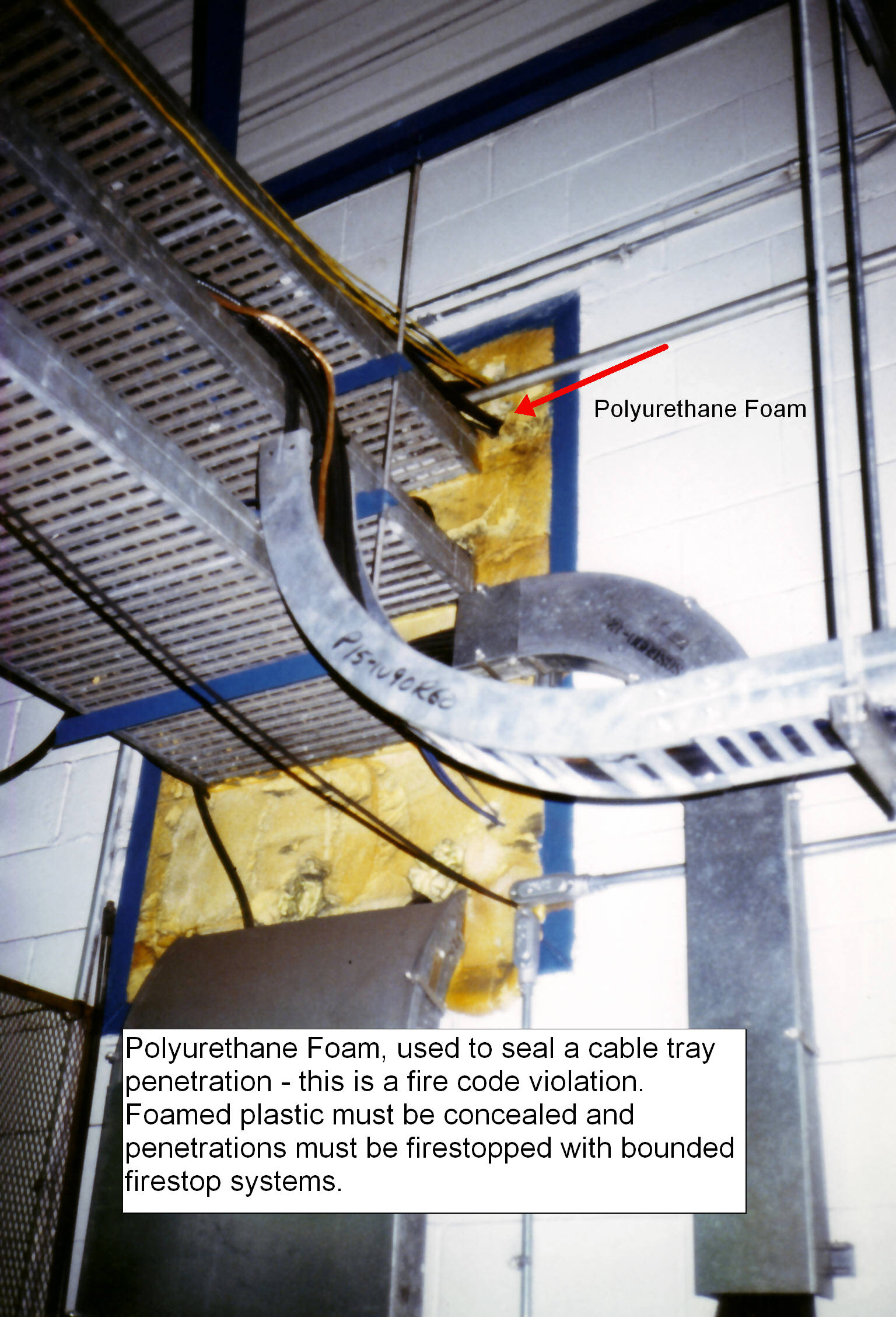
Polyurethane foam used to fill a cable tray penetration at a power plant in Nova Scotia (subsequently removed and replaced with firestop mortar).

On March 22, 1975, a fire started when a worker using a candle to search for air leaks accidentally set a temporary cable seal on fire. At Browns Ferry, foamed plastic, covered on both sides with two coats of a flame-retardant paint, was used as a firestop. The fire spread from the temporary seal into the foamed plastic, causing significant damage to the reactor-control cabling in the station.

An NRC bulletin explained the circumstances of the fire.

The fire started in the cable spreading room at a cable penetration through the wall between the cable spreading room and the reactor building for Unit 1. A slight differential pressure is maintained (by design) across this wall, with the higher pressure being on the cable spreading room side. The penetration seal originally present had been breached to install additional cables required by a design modification. Site personnel were resealing the penetration after cable installation and were checking the airflow through a temporary seal with a candle flame prior to installing the permanent sealing material. The temporary sealing material was highly combustible, and caught fire. Efforts were made by the workers to extinguish the fire at its origin, but they apparently did not recognize that the fire, under the influence of the draft through the penetration, was spreading on the reactor building side of the wall. The extent of the fire in the cable spreading room was limited to a few feet from the penetration; nonetheless, the presence of the fire on the other side of the wall from the point of ignition was not recognized until significant damage to cables related to the control of Units 1 and 2 had occurred.

This later resulted in the Nuclear Regulatory Commission making significant additions to the standards for fire protection through the publication of 10CFR50.48 and Appendix R. According to the Nuclear Information and Resource Service, the newly restarted Unit 1 does not comply with these standards. Unit 3 was not affected by the accident. This event was pivotal not just for firestopping in the nuclear field, but also in commercial and industrial construction. While the nuclear field went to installations of silicone foam, a wider array of firestops became prevalent in non-nuclear construction.

== Unit 2 ==
Unit 2 is a 1,259 MWe net BWR/4 built by General Electric that originally came online on August 2, 1974, and is licensed to operate through June 28, 2034. Unit 2 generated 8,396 GWh of electricity in 2017, achieving a capacity factor of 86.81%.

Unit 2 returned to service in 1991, after all three reactors were shut down in 1985. During a drought in August 2007, Unit 2 was shut down for one day because water temperature in the Tennessee River rose too high for the water to be used for cooling and then discharged back into the river.

Beginning in 2005 Unit 2 was loaded with BLEU (Blended Low Enriched Uranium) recovered by the DOE from weapons programs. This fuel contains quantities of U-236 and other contaminants because it was made from reprocessed fuel from weapons-program reactors and therefore has slightly different characteristics when used in a reactor as compared to fresh uranium fuel. By making use of this fuel, which would otherwise have been disposed of as waste, the TVA is saving millions of dollars in fuel costs and accumulating a database of recycled uranium reactions in LWR use.

== Unit 3 ==
Unit 3 is a 1,260 MWe net BWR/4 built by General Electric that originally came online on August 18, 1976, with a capacity of 1,105 MWe net, and is licensed to operate through July 2, 2036. Unit 3 returned to service in 1995 after all three units were shut down in 1985 for maintenance and repairs. Unit 3 generated 9,651 GWh in 2017, achieving a capacity factor of 99.70%. The power update of 155 MWe was completed in July 2018.

== Additional incidents ==
=== June 28, 1980 ===
During a routine shutdown of Unit 3, a manual scram at roughly 36% power failed to insert around 40% of the control rods. Operators scrammed the reactor manually twice, followed by an automatic scram, before all control rods were fully inserted.

An investigation by the plant, NRC, and General Electric determined that the cause of failure was an accumulation of water in the east-side SDV header during the first scram. The SDV receives "exhaust" water from control rod drives during a scram, to allow for the rods to fully insert.

=== March 19, 1985 ===
TVA decided to shut the entire plant down and keep it shut down indefinitely in order to focus on making improvements to all three units in order to bring it back into regulatory compliance following extremely negative assessments from the NRC. Unit 2 finally resumed operation on May 24, 1991, with Unit 3 following it on November 1, 1995, although Unit 1 did not resume operation until June 2, 2007.

=== May 10, 1986 ===
Cooling tower #4 (which was 90 feet (27 m) wide, 300 feet (91 m) long, and four stories tall) was destroyed in a fire caused by sparks from the electrical cooling fans in the tower hitting the abnormally dry redwood slats within the tower on May 10, 1986. During normal operation, water was kept flowing near-continuously over the redwood slats within the tower, but after close to two months of inactivity, the slats were very dry and extremely flammable. $5 million of damage was done.

=== May 23, 1996 ===
Cooling tower #3 (which was in the process of being refurbished at the time) was heavily damaged in a fire on May 23, 1996, with about 80% of the tower destroyed.

=== August 19, 2006 ===
At 11:05 AM on August 19, 2006, Unit 3 was manually scrammed due to loss of both the 3A and 3B Reactor Recirculation pumps. The initial investigation found the Variable Frequency Drive (VFD) microprocessors non-responsive. The root cause of the event was that the VFD controls malfunctioned due to excessive traffic on the connected plant Integrated Control System (ICS) network. Corrective actions included installing network firewalls that limit the connections and traffic to the VFD controllers.

=== April 27, 2011 ===
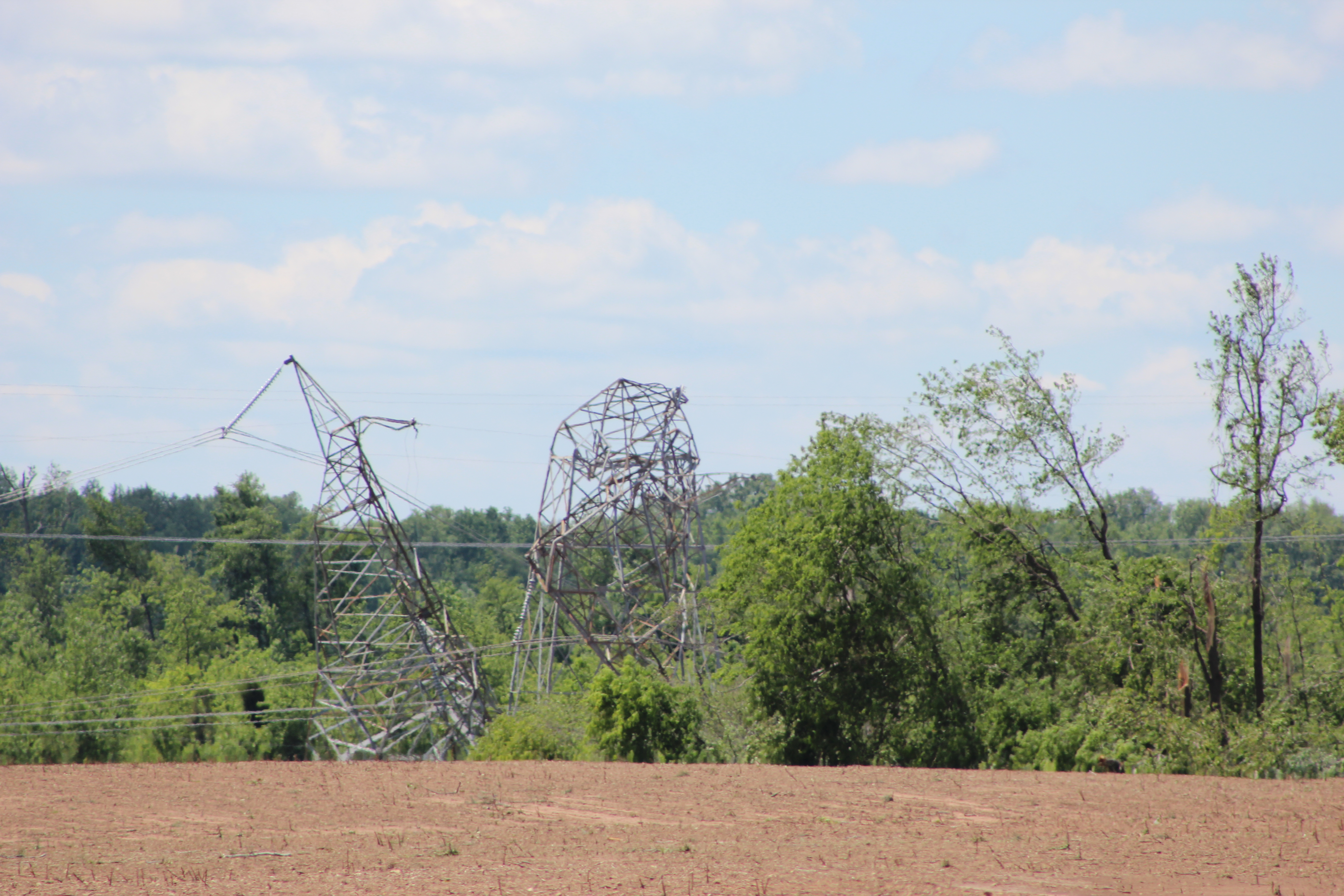
Towers crumpled by the tornado.

At 5:01 PM on April 27, 2011, all three reactors scrammed due to loss of external power caused by a tornado in the vicinity of the plant. Control-rod insertion and cooling procedures operated as designed with no physical damage or release of radiation. Diesel backup generators provided power after a brief period of outage. An NRC Unusual Event, the lowest level of emergency classification, was declared due to loss of power exceeding 15 minutes. Additionally, a small oil leak was found on one generator. Due to widespread transmission-grid damage from the storms, Browns Ferry was unable to produce power for the grid, and significant blackouts occurred throughout the Southeastern United States.

=== January 2015 ===
A drain line leaked 100–200 gallons of water containing tritium levels above acceptable EPA drinking water standards. The leak was fixed within three hours of when it was discovered and was largely contained within the plant area.

=== May 2015 ===
The Nuclear Regulatory Commission found that 5 contract workers failed to conduct roving fire-watch patrols as required by NRC. As a result, Tennessee Valley Authority was fined $140,000 for failing to maintain adequate fire watches in 2015 at Browns Ferry.

== Surrounding population ==
The 2010 U.S. population within 10 miles (16 km) of Browns Ferry was 39,930, an increase of 12.3 percent in a decade, according to an analysis of U.S. Census data for msnbc.com. In 2020, the population within 50 miles (80 km) was about 1.4 million, an increase of 43 percent since 2010. Cities within 50 miles include Huntsville (28 miles (45 km) to city center).

== Seismic risk ==
According to an NRC study using geological data from 1989 to 2008, which was published in August 2010, the estimated risk of an earthquake intense enough to cause core damage to reactor one was 1 in 270,270 per year, and for reactors two and three, the risk was 1 in 185,185 per year.

== See also ==
- List of largest power stations in the United States
- Largest nuclear power plants in the United States
- New Madrid Seismic Zone
- 1811–12 New Madrid earthquakes
