= Applied science technician =

Canadian certification

Applied science technician is a Canadian certification awarded on the basis of academic qualification and work experience.

In the province of British Columbia, this is a regulated occupation.

The province of Alberta has never used the term and has no analog for the term. In Saskatchewan, the term has been superseded by the term "certified technician".

In the province of Manitoba, the term "applied science engineering technician" is referenced, but is considered outdated. The current term used is certified engineering technician.

In the province of Ontario, the term "applied science technician" is used to describe some college courses, but the term has been superseded in legislation by the term "Certified Technician".

In the province of Nova Scotia, the term "certified applied science technician" is protected by the statue entitled "An Act Respecting the Certified Applied Science Technicians and Technologists."
