= Journal of Applied Biomedicine =

- Discipline: Biomedicine
- Language: English
- Edited by: Josef Berger

Publication details
- History: 2003–present
- Publisher: University of South Bohemia (Czech Republic)
- Frequency: Quarterly
- Open access: Yes
- Impact factor: 1.302 (2014)

Standard abbreviations
- ISO 4: J. Appl. Biomed.

Indexing
- CODEN: JABOBD
- ISSN: 1214-021X (print); 1214-0287 (web)
- OCLC no.: 60630371

Links
- Journal homepage

The Journal of Applied Biomedicine is a peer-reviewed medical journal published quarterly by the University of South Bohemia. It covers fundamental biomedical research, clinical investigation and practice, as well as public health. The editor-in-chief is Josef Berger.

== Abstracting and indexing ==
This journal is abstracted and indexed by:

- Science Citation Index Expanded
- EMBASE
- Elsevier BIOBASE
- Scopus
- Chemical Abstracts Service
- Academic Search Complete
- CAB Abstracts
- Global Health
