= Journal of Applied Gerontology =

- Discipline: Gerontology
- Language: English
- Edited by: Julie Robison

Publication details
- History: 1982-present
- Publisher: SAGE Publications
- Frequency: Monthly
- Impact factor: 1.638 (2016)

Standard abbreviations
- ISO 4: J. Appl. Gerontol.

Indexing
- ISSN: 0733-4648 (print); 1552-4523 (web)
- LCCN: 82645314
- OCLC no.: 8586390

Links
- Journal homepage; Online access; Online archive

Journal of Applied Gerontology is a peer-reviewed academic journal that publishes papers in the field of Applied Gerontology. The journal's editor as of August 1, 2017 is Julie Robison (University of Connecticut). It has been in publication since 1982 and is currently published by SAGE Publications in association with the Southern Gerontological Society.

== Scope ==
Journal of Applied Gerontology provides an international forum for information that is directly related to health, care and quality of life of the elderly. The journal aims to give comprehensive coverage of the areas of Gerontology practice and policy such as ethnicity and aging, technology and care and mental health.

== Abstracting and indexing ==
Journal of Applied Gerontology is abstracted and indexed in, among other databases: SCOPUS and the Social Sciences Citation Index. According to the Journal Citation Reports, its 2019 impact factor is 2.144, ranking it 11 out of 36 journals in the category ‘Gerontology’.
