= National Training Laboratories =

The National Training Laboratories Institute for Applied Behavioral Science, known as the NTL Institute, is an American non-profit behavioral psychology center founded by Kurt Lewin in 1947.

== Overview ==
NTL became a major influence in modern corporate training programs, and in particular, developed the T-groups methodology that remains in place today. Lewin died early on in the project and the work was continued by co-founders Ron Lippitt, Lee Bradford, and Ken Benne, among others. The NTL Institute produced or influenced other notable and influential contributors to the human relations movement in post-World War II management though, notably Douglas McGregor (who, like Lewin, also died young), Chris Argyris, Edgar H. Schein, and Warren Bennis.

NTL began publishing The Journal of Applied Behavioral Science in 1965, which focuses on research in applied behavioral science and organizational change.

The NTL Institute continues to work in the field of organization development. The original center in Bethel, Maine continues to operate, but the organization has moved its headquarters to Silver Spring, Maryland.

== See also ==
- Tavistock Institute
