= List of glaciologists =

Glaciology first emerged as a science in the Swiss Alps, where most of the first glaciologists lived. Since then glaciologists from several countries, particularly from the First World, have made notable contributions to the discipline. Many glaciologists have backgrounds in geology, physics and climatology.

List of notable glaciologists
Name	Birth	Death	Contributions
Louis Agassiz	1807	1873	First to scientifically propose the existence of past ice ages
Richard Alley	1957		Studied the effects of basal properties on glacier motion.
Jens Esmark	1763	1839	Extension of past glaciations
Jón Eyþórsson	1898	1968	Long-term observation and measurement of glacier margins in Iceland
Andrea Fischer	1973		Dynamics of climate change on the surface and subsurface of glaciers
James David Forbes	1809	1868	Concluded that glaciers were viscous bodies
Helen Fricker	1969		Discovered active subglacial lakes in Antarctica.
Chad Greene	1984		Produced the first global assessment of glacier seasonal dynamics.
Louis Lliboutry	1922	2007	Formation of penitentes, surveyed Andean glaciers
Mark Meier		2012	Expert on sea level rise due to melting glaciers; Director of the Institute of Arctic and Alpine Research (INSTAAR) from 1985 to 1994.
John H. Mercer	1922	1987	Linked the greenhouse effect to the potential for rapid sea level rise via marine ice sheet instability.
Ukichiro Nakaya	1900	1962	Studied Tyndall figures, created first artificial snowflakes
John Nye	1923	2019	Developed a fundamental flow law for glaciers.
Louis Rendu	1789	1859	Theorized on glacier motion
Eric Rignot	1961		Produced the first pan-Antarctic map of glacier velocity.
Valter Schytt	1919	1985	Studied Storglaciären in northern Sweden
Wilhelm Sievers	1860	1921	Documented South American ice ages
Sigurður Þórarinsson	1912	1983	significant contributions in many areas of geology, especially volcanology and glaciology, both in Iceland and abroad.
John Tyndall	1820	1893	Studied glacier motion
Ignaz Venetz	1788	1859	Suggested the existence of past ice ages
Mary Vaux Walcott	1860	1940	Amateur glaciologist who studied and documented changes to the Illecillewaet Glacier for 25 years
