= Alpine tundra =

Biome found at high altitudes

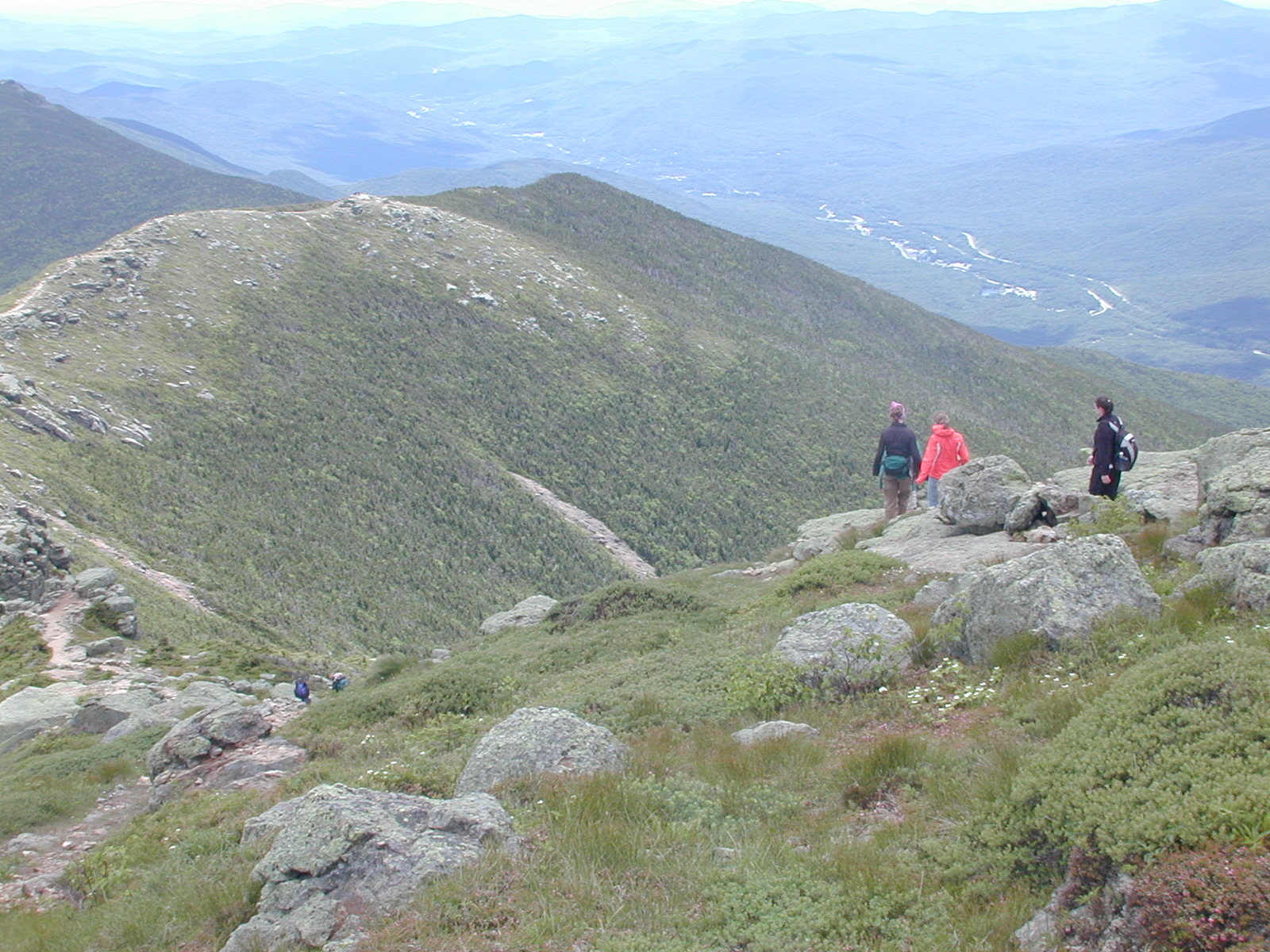
Hikers traversing the Franconia Ridge in the White Mountains of New Hampshire, much of which is in the alpine zone.

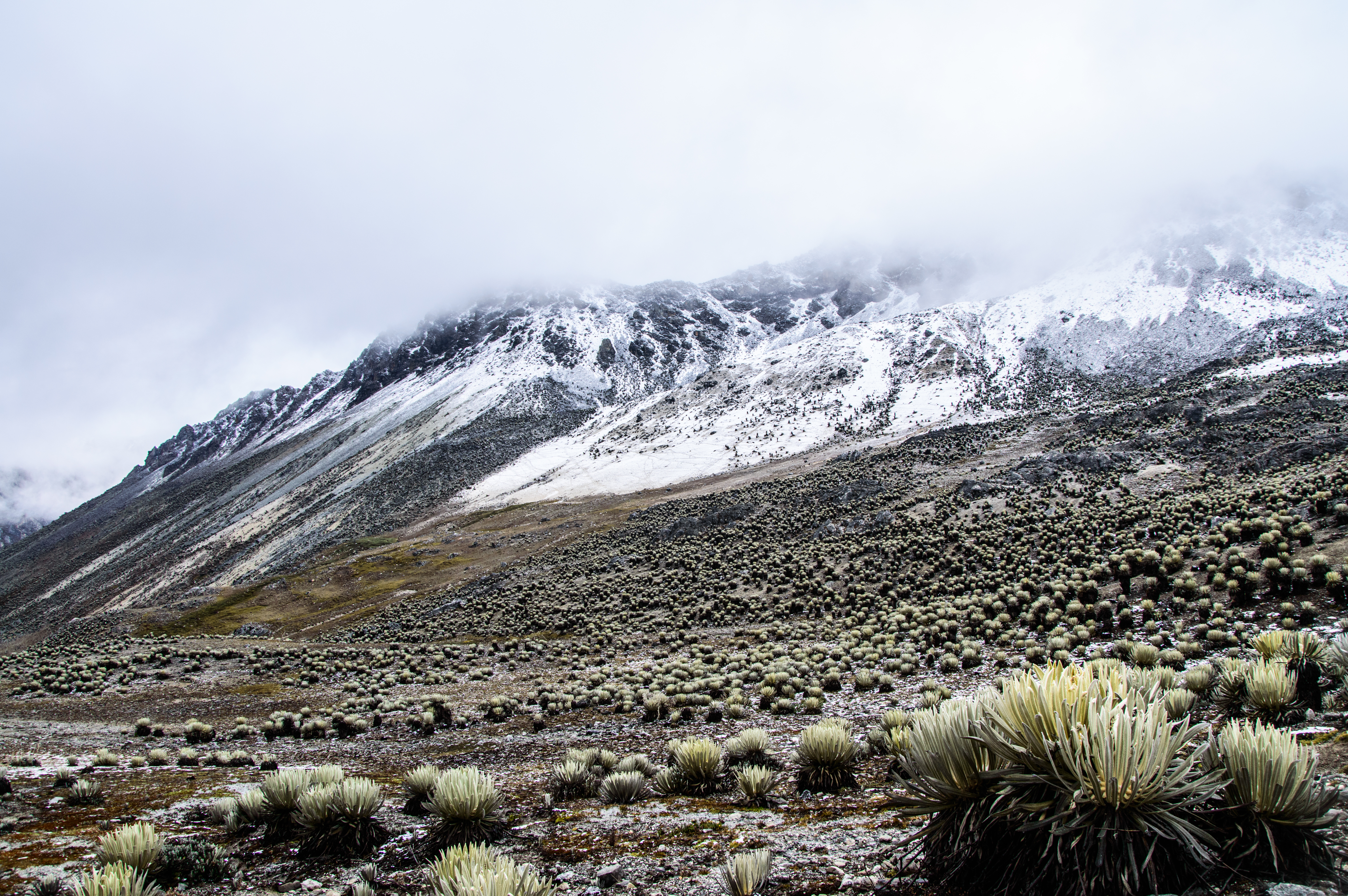
Alpine tundra in the Venezuelan Andes

Alpine tundra is a type of natural region or biome that does not contain trees because it is at high elevation, with an associated harsh climate. As the latitude of a location approaches the poles, the threshold elevation for alpine tundra gets lower until it reaches sea level and merges with polar tundra.

The high elevation causes an adverse climate, which is too cold and windy to support tree growth. Alpine tundra transitions to sub-alpine forests below the tree line; stunted forests occurring at the forest-tundra ecotone are known as krummholz. With increasing elevation it ends at the snow line where snow and ice persist through summer.

Alpine tundra occurs in mountains worldwide. The flora of the alpine tundra is characterized by dwarf shrubs close to the ground. The cold climate of the alpine tundra is caused by adiabatic cooling of air, and is similar to polar climate.

== Geography ==
Alpine tundra occurs at high enough altitude at any latitude. Portions of montane grasslands and shrublands ecoregions worldwide include alpine tundra. Large regions of alpine tundra occur in the North American Cordillera and parts of the northern Appalachian Mountains in North America, the Alps and Pyrenees of Europe, the Himalaya and Karakoram of Asia, the Andes of South America, the Eastern Rift mountains of Africa, the Snowy Mountains of Australia, the South Island of New Zealand, and the Scandinavian Mountains.

Alpine tundra occupies high-mountain summits, slopes, and ridges above timberline. Aspect plays a role as well; the treeline often occurs at higher elevations on warmer equator-facing slopes. Because the alpine zone is present only on mountains, much of the landscape is rugged and broken, with rocky, snowcapped peaks, cliffs, and talus slopes, but also contains areas of gently rolling to almost flat topography.

Averaging over many locations and local microclimates, the treeline rises 75 meters (245 ft) when moving 1 degree south from 70 to 50°N, and 130 meters (430 ft) per degree from 50 to 30°N. Between 30°N and 20°S, the treeline is roughly constant, between 3,500 and 4,000 meters (11,500 and 13,100 ft).

== Climate ==
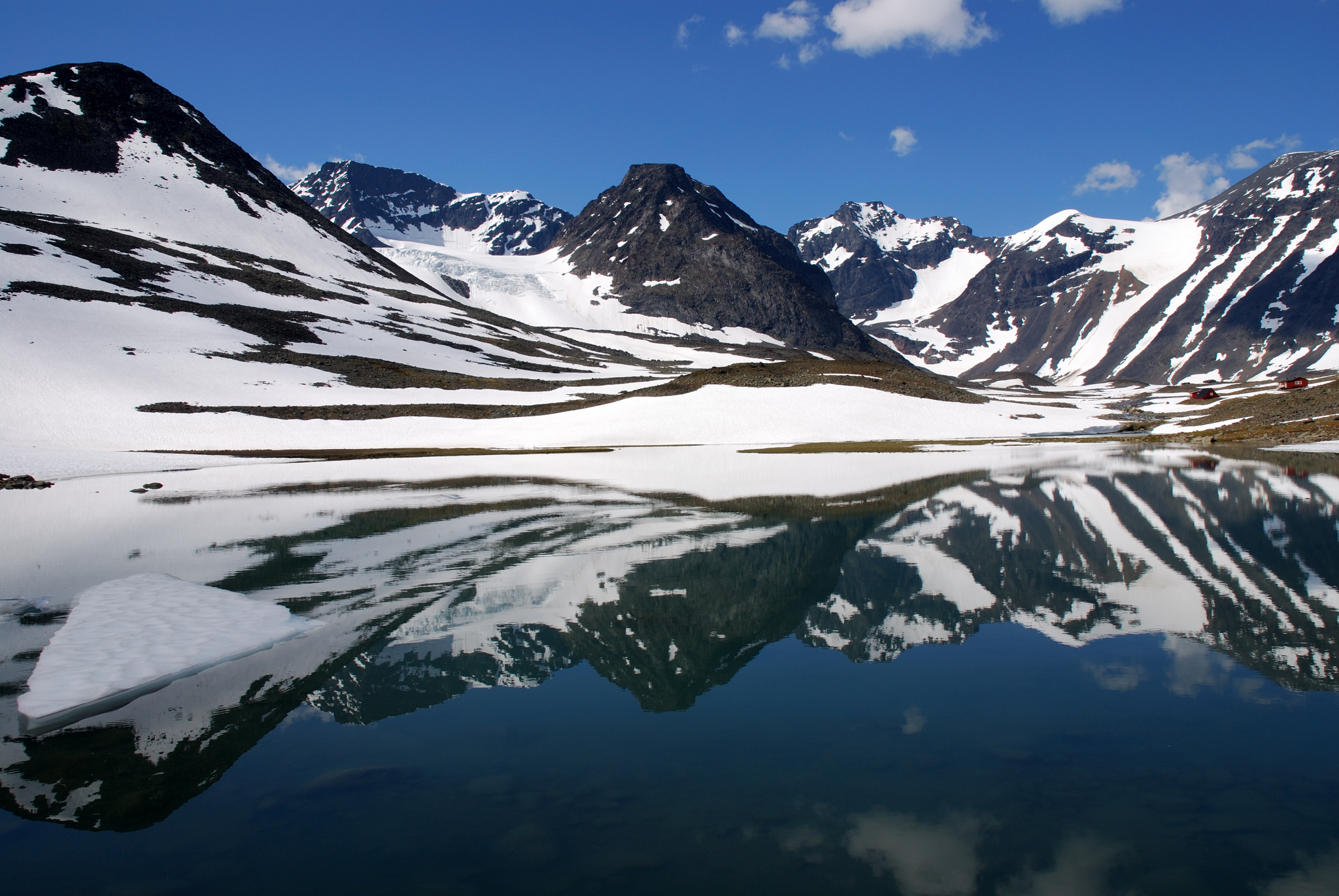
Summer in Northern Sweden's Tarfala Valley with its alpine climate

Alpine climate is the average weather (climate) for the alpine tundra. The climate becomes colder when reaching higher elevations—this characteristic is described by the lapse rate of air: air tends to get colder as it rises, since it expands. The dry adiabatic lapse rate is 10 °C per km (5.5 °F per 1000 ft) of elevation or altitude. Therefore, moving up 100 meters (330 ft) on a mountain is roughly equivalent to moving 80 kilometers (45 miles or 0.75° of latitude) towards the pole. This relationship is only approximate, however, since local factors such as proximity to oceans can drastically modify the climate.

In the alpine tundra, trees cannot tolerate the environmental conditions (usually cold temperatures, extreme snowpack, or associated lack of available moisture). Typical high-elevation growing seasons range from 45 to 90 days, with average summer temperatures near 10 °C (50 °F). Growing season temperatures frequently fall below freezing, and frost occurs throughout the growing season in many areas. Precipitation occurs mainly as winter snow, but soil water availability is highly variable with season, location, and topography. For example, snowfields commonly accumulate on the lee sides of ridges while ridgelines may remain nearly snow free due to redistribution by wind. Some alpine habitats may be up to 70% snow free in winter. High winds are common in alpine ecosystems, and can cause significant soil erosion and be physically and physiologically detrimental to plants. Also, wind coupled with high solar radiation can promote extremely high rates of evaporation and transpiration.

=== Quantifying the climate ===
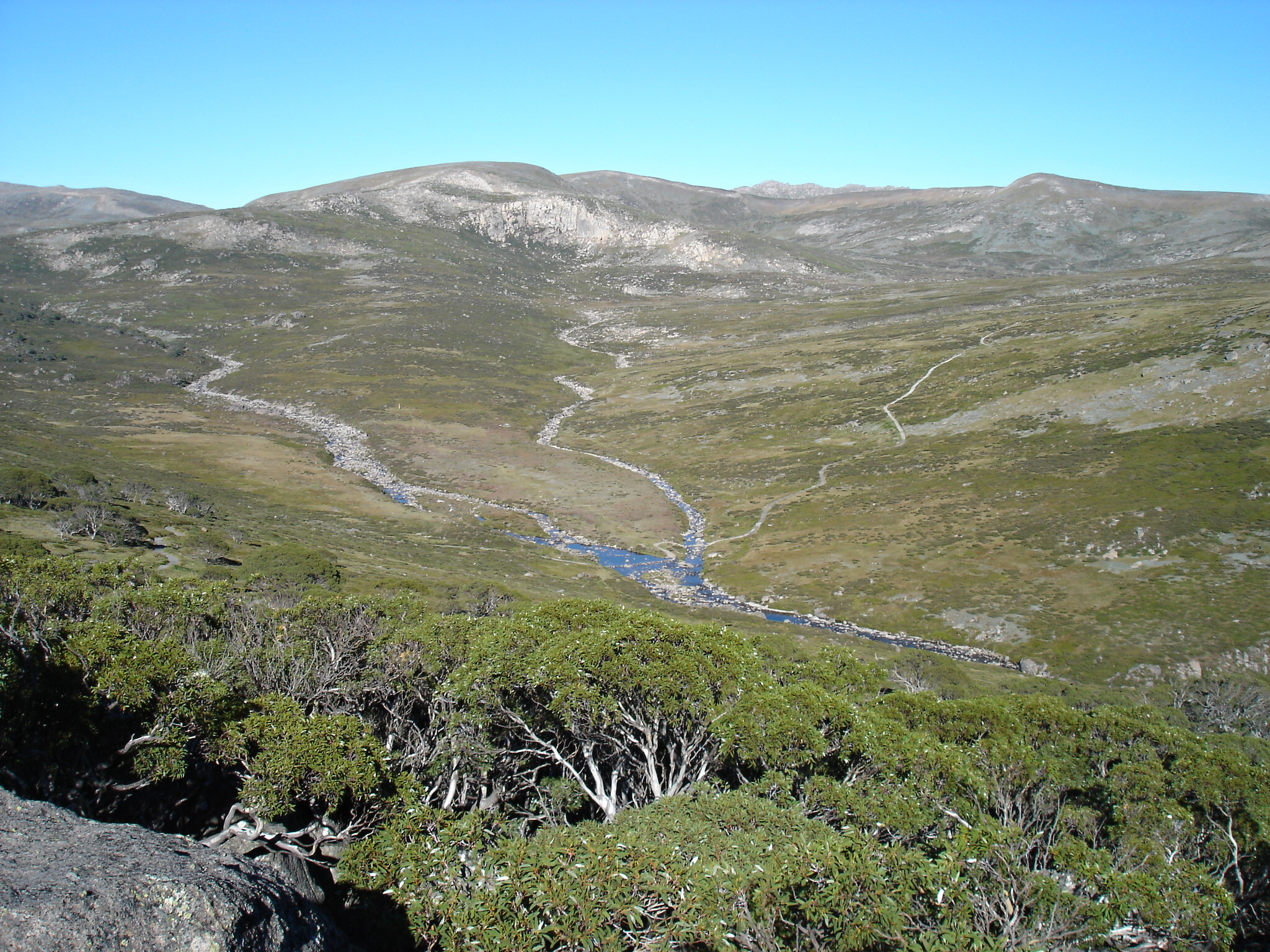
Alpine tundra just above the tree line in Kosciuszko National Park, Australia

There have been several attempts at quantifying what constitutes an alpine climate.

Climatologist Wladimir Köppen demonstrated a relationship between the Arctic and Antarctic tree lines and the 10 °C summer isotherm; i.e., places where the average temperature in the warmest calendar month of the year is below 10 °C cannot support forests. See Köppen climate classification for more information.

Otto Nordenskjöld theorized that winter conditions also play a role: His formula is W = 9 − 0.1 C, where W is the average temperature in the warmest month and C the average of the coldest month, both in degrees Celsius (this would mean, for example, that if a particular location had an average temperature of −20 °C (−4 °F) in its coldest month, the warmest month would need to average 11 °C (52 °F) or higher for trees to be able to survive there).

In 1947, Holdridge improved on these schemes, by defining biotemperature: the mean annual temperature, where all temperatures below 0 °C are treated as 0 °C (because it makes no difference to plant life, being dormant). If the mean biotemperature is between 1.5 and 3 °C (34.7 and 37.4 °F), Holdridge quantifies the climate as alpine.

== Flora ==
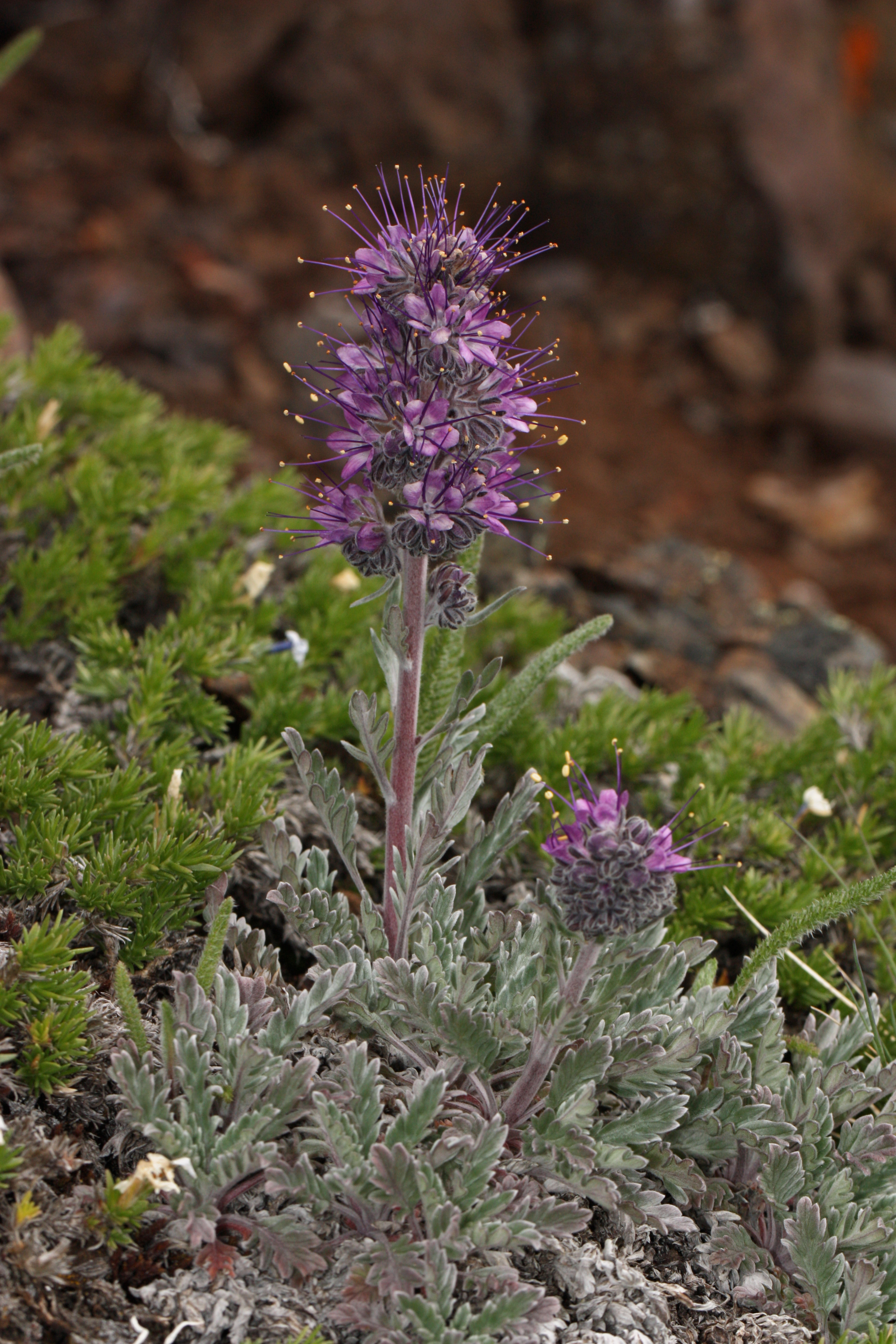
Silky phacelia (Phacelia sericea, blooming) and spreading phlox (Phlox diffusa) are species of alpine regions of western North America.

Since the habitat of alpine vegetation is subject to intense radiation, wind, cold, snow, and ice, it grows close to the ground and consists mainly of perennial grasses, sedges, and forbs. Perennial herbs (including grasses, sedges, and low woody or semi-woody shrubs) dominate the alpine landscape; they have much more root and rhizome biomass than that of shoots, leaves, and flowers. The roots and rhizomes not only function in water and nutrient absorption but also play a very important role in over-winter carbohydrate storage. Annual plants are rare in this ecosystem and usually are only a few inches tall, with weak root systems. Other common plant life-forms include prostrate shrubs; tussock-forming graminoids; cushion plants; and cryptogams, such as bryophytes and lichens.

Relative to lower elevation areas in the same region, alpine regions have a high rate of endemism and a high diversity of plant species. This taxonomic diversity can be attributed to geographical isolation, climate changes, glaciation, microhabitat differentiation, and different histories of migration or evolution or both. These phenomena contribute to plant diversity by introducing new flora and favoring adaptations, both of new species and the dispersal of pre-existing species.

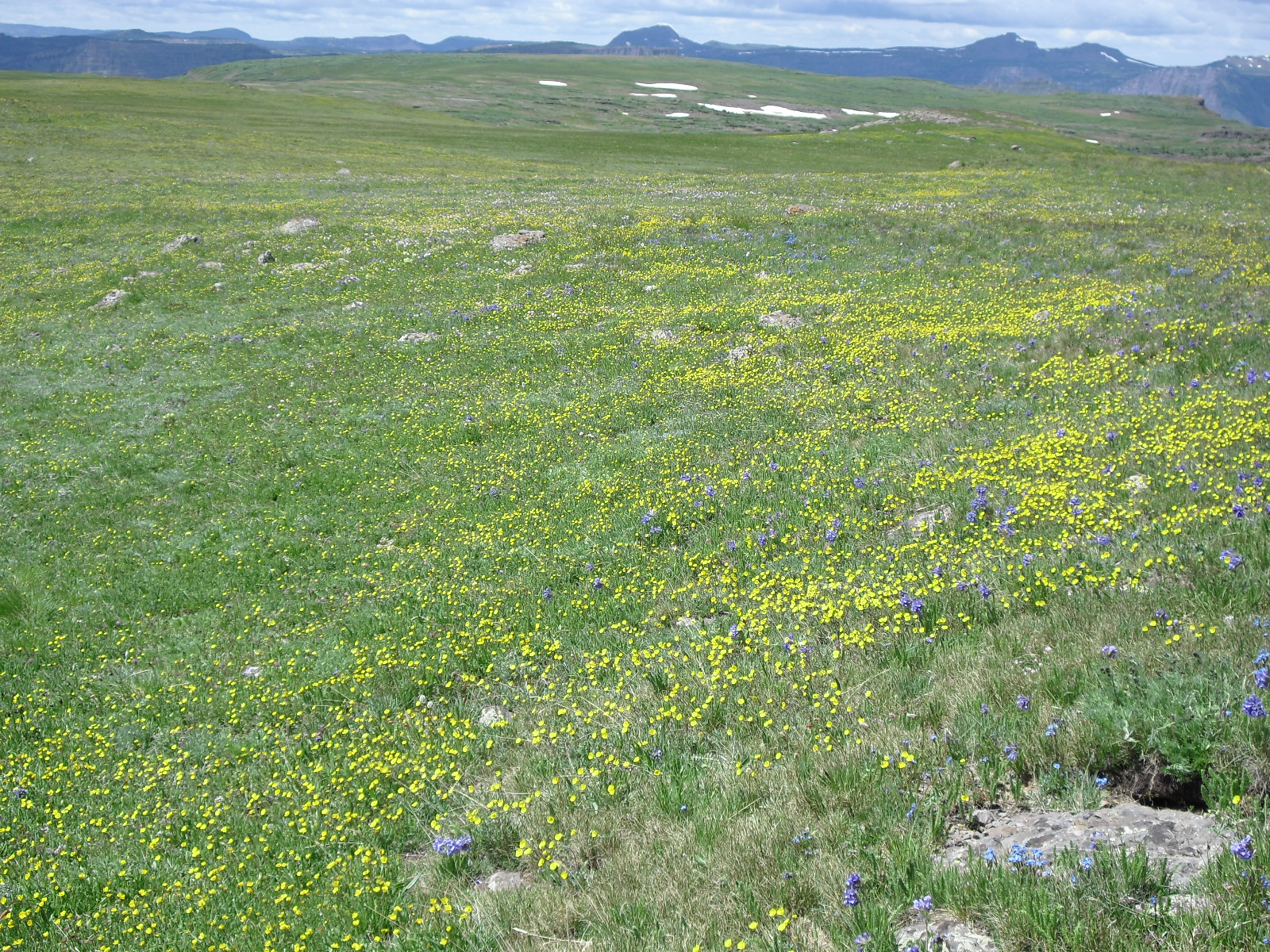
Alpine flora at 11,500 feet (3500 m) on the Flat Tops plateau in the Colorado Rocky Mountains U.S.A

Plants have adapted to the harsh alpine environment. Cushion plants, looking like ground-hugging clumps of moss, escape the strong winds blowing a few inches above them. Many flowering plants of the alpine tundra have dense hairs on stems and leaves to provide wind protection or red-colored pigments capable of converting the sun's light rays into heat. Some plants take two or more years to form flower buds, which survive the winter below the surface and then open and produce fruit with seeds in the few weeks of summer. In various areas of alpine tundra, woody plant encroachment is observed.

Alpine areas are unique because of the severity and complexity of their environmental conditions. Very small changes in topography – as small as 1 foot (0.3 m) or less – may mean the difference between a windswept area or an area of snow accumulation, changing the potential productivity and plant community drastically. Between these extremes of drought versus saturation, several intermediate environments may exist all within a few yards of each other, depending on topography, substrate, and climate. Alpine vegetation generally occurs in a mosaic of small patches with widely differing environmental conditions. Vegetation types vary from cushion and rosette plants on the ridges and in the rock crannies; to herbaceous and grassy vegetation along the slopes; dwarf shrubs with grasses and forbs below the melting snowdrifts; and sedges, grasses, low shrubs, and mosses in the bogs and along the brooks.

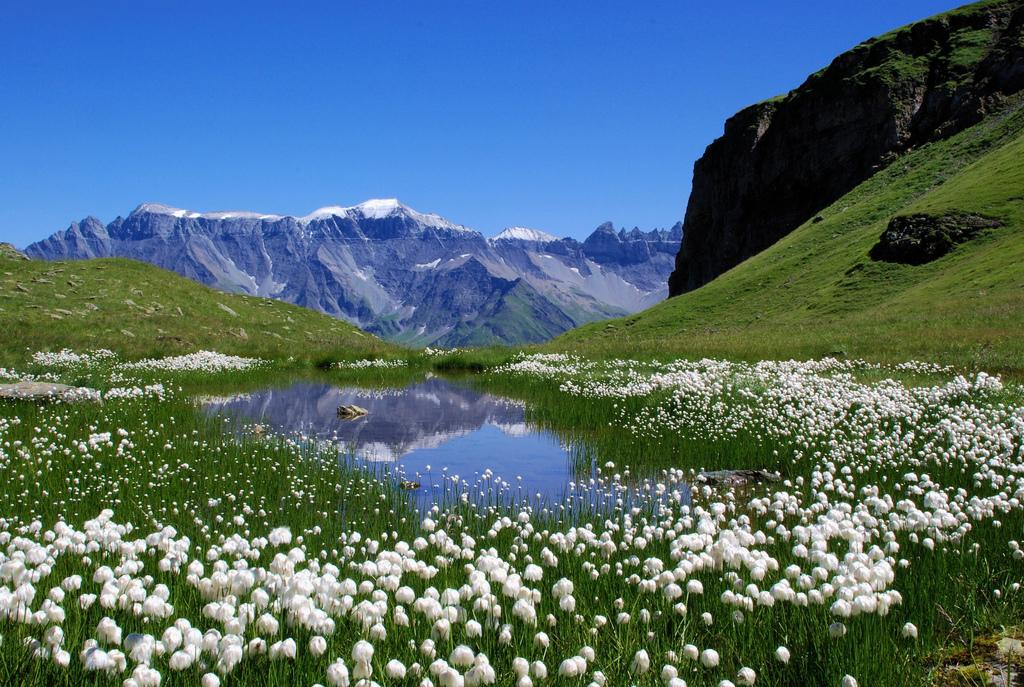
An alpine mire in the Swiss Alps

Alpine meadows form where sediments from the weathering of rocks has produced soils well-developed enough to support grasses and sedges. Non-flowering lichens cling to rocks and soil. Their enclosed algal cells can photosynthesize at any temperature above 0 °C (32 °F), and the outer fungal layers can absorb more than their own weight in water. The adaptations for survival of drying winds and cold may make tundra vegetation seem very hardy, but in some respects the tundra is very fragile. Repeated footsteps often destroy tundra plants, allowing exposed soil to blow away; recovery may take hundreds of years.

The characteristic aroma of many alpine meadows in the European Alps during summer is significantly influenced by the volatile organic compounds (VOCs) emitted by dominant plant species. For example, alpine clover (Trifolium alpinum), a key forage and soil-stabilizing plant, produces a strong, spicy-sweet fragrance from its flowers that permeates the environment: this scent, a complex blend of terpenes and other compounds, is an adaptation to the high-altitude environment, serving to attract scarce pollinators and deter herbivores.

== Fauna ==
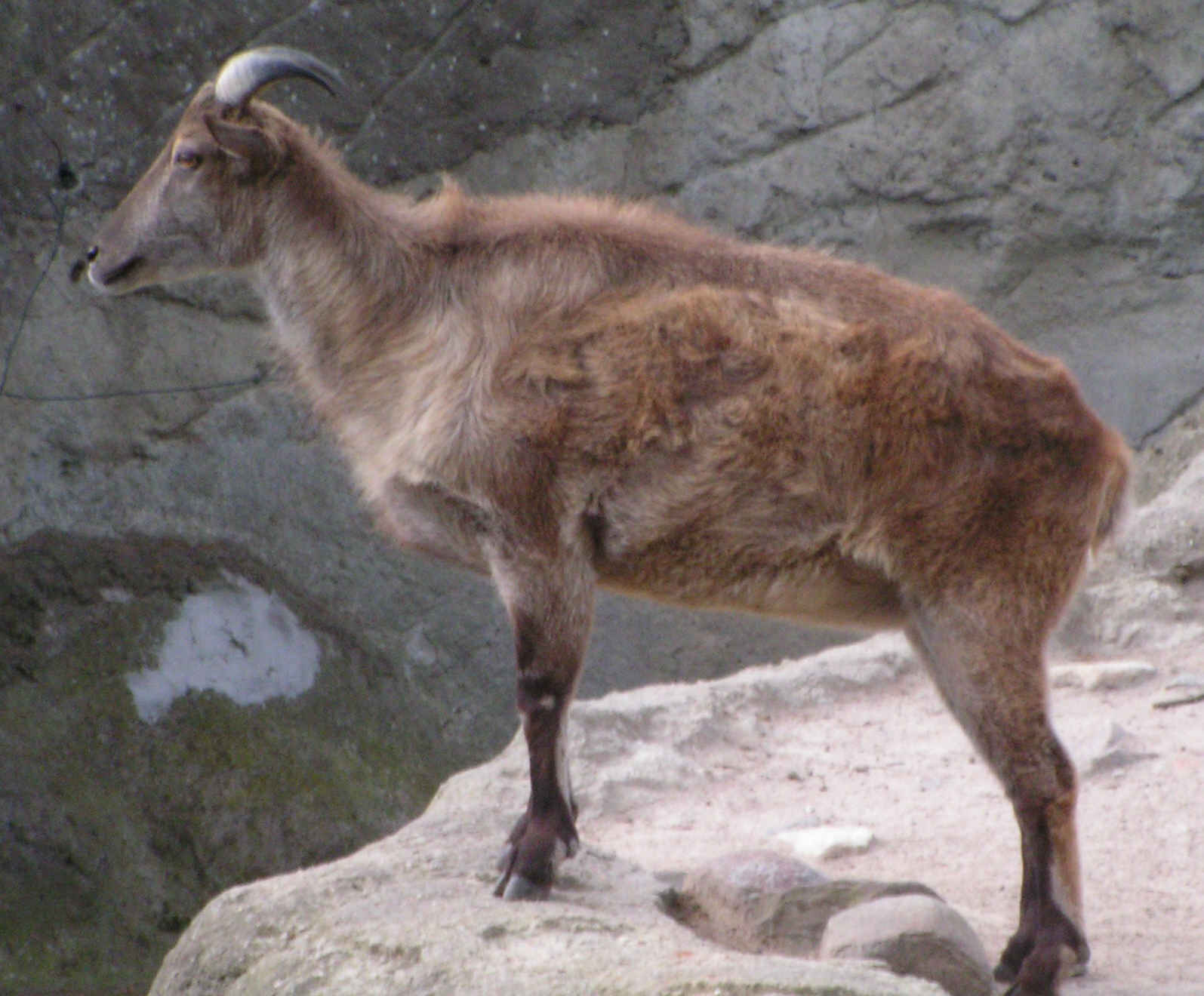
The Himalayan tahr

Because alpine tundra is located in various widely separated regions of the Earth, there is no animal species common to all areas of alpine tundra. Some animals of alpine tundra environments include the kea, marmot, mountain goat, bighorn sheep, chinchilla, Himalayan tahr, yak, snow leopard, and pika.

== See also ==
- Montane grasslands and shrublands
- Urals montane tundra and taiga
- Polonyna (montane meadow)
- Montane ecosystems
- Tundra
