= Scientific Committee on Antarctic Research =

British organization

- Abbreviation: SCAR
- Formation: 1958; 68 years ago
- Type: INGO
- Region served: Worldwide
- Official language: English
- Parent organization: International Science Council
- Website: scar.org

The Scientific Committee on Antarctic Research (SCAR) is an interdisciplinary body of the International Science Council (ISC). SCAR coordinates international scientific research efforts in Antarctica, including the Southern Ocean.

SCAR's scientific work is administered through several discipline-themed science groups. The organisation has observer status at, and provides independent advice to Antarctic Treaty Consultative Meetings, and also provides information to other international bodies such as the Intergovernmental Panel on Climate Change (IPCC) and the United Nations Framework Convention on Climate Change (UNFCCC).

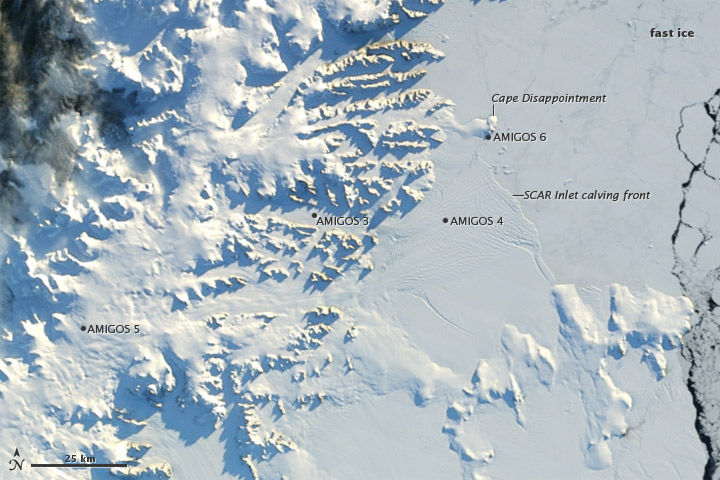
The calving front at the SCAR Inlet is named for the 'Scientific Committee on Antarctic Research. It is the remaining fragment of the much larger Larsen B ice shelf which disintegrated in 2002.

== History ==
At the International Council of Scientific Unions (ICSU)'s Antarctic meeting held in Stockholm from 9–11 September 1957, it was agreed that a committee should be created to oversee scientific research in Antarctica. At the time there were 12 nations actively conducting Antarctic research and they were each invited to nominate one delegate to join a Special Committee on Antarctic Research. The 12 nations were Argentina, Australia, Belgium, Chile, France, Japan, New Zealand, Norway, South Africa, United Kingdom, United States, and USSR.

The Special Committee held its first meeting in the Hague from 3–6 February 1958 and elected its first Executive Committee - Ing. Gen. Georges Laclavère (French) as president, Professor Keith Edward Bullen (British) as vice president, and Valter Schytt (Swedish) as secretary. A Finance Committee and three working groups were also formed at this meeting.

The organisation's name was later changed to the Scientific Committee on Antarctic Research.

== Structure ==
SCAR is currently made up of 35 full member countries, 11 associate member countries and 9 unions. Each full member country appoints a permanent delegate and an alternate delegate; associate member countries appoint just one delegate. The delegates meet every two years to decide on SCAR's strategic direction and which delegates to elect to the Executive Committee.

The role of the Executive Committee is to work with the SCAR Secretariat (based at the Scott Polar Research Institute in Cambridge, England) to carry out decisions made by the Delegates. The Executive Committee is made up of a president, an immediate past-president, four vice-presidents and the executive director of SCAR.

== Activities ==
=== Meetings ===
One of the ways that SCAR brings researchers together is through meetings. These include biennial Open Science Conferences (OSCs), Delegate Meetings, the SCAR Biology Symposium (every 4 years), the International Symposium on Antarctic Earth Sciences, and the Humanities and Social Science Symposium.

==== Open Science Conferences ====
SCAR has been organising biennial Open Science Conferences (OSCs) in various member countries including Germany, Australia, Russia, Argentina, US, New Zealand, Malaysia, Switzerland, Australia, India and Chile since 2004. The OSCs give Antarctic scientists opportunities to draw attention to Antarctic issues, hold scientific group meetings, share their work, and network.

=== Science ===
Over 30 groups coordinate Antarctic research across a variety of disciplines and themes through SCAR. SCAR has three permanent science groups:

- Geosciences
- Life Sciences
- Physical Sciences

Each science group encompasses scientific research programmes (SRPs) in priority areas. SRPs have a lifetime of about eight years and new programmes can be suggested and developed through programme planning groups (PPGs).

In 2018, a permanent Standing Committee on the Humanities and Social Sciences was set up to recognise the important and growing contribution of the humanities and social sciences communities to Antarctic research. Antarctica's human history is relatively recent and this important area of study explores how humans interact with the region.

Each science group also has action groups (AGs), which have a lifetime of two to four years and are intended to solve short-term issues, and wider-focus expert groups (EGs), which last between six and eight years. Examples include the AntArchitecture Action Group, the Antarctic Wildlife Health Network Action Group, the Earth Observation Action Group, and the Antarctic Tourism Action Group.

=== Policy ===
One aspect of SCAR's work is identifying emerging issues from Antarctic and Southern Ocean research and bringing them to the attention of policymakers, including the Antarctic Treaty, the UNFCCC and IPCC. Environmental and conservation related science is a large and growing part of SCAR's policy work.

In 2002 SCAR received the prestigious Prince of Asturias Award for International Cooperation.

SCAR provides independent scientific advice to the Antarctic Treaty Consultative Meetings via its Standing Committee on the Antarctic Treaty System (SCATS). SCATS brings together global scientists to create papers on the status of particular areas of research, to present at the Antarctic Treaty Consultative Meetings. SCAR is also tasked with providing advice to a number of other bodies, including the Commission for the Conservation of Antarctic Marine Living Resources.

In 2019, SCAR's long-standing contribution to the Antarctic Treaty System was recognised by the passing of a resolution calling for the representative countries' Governments to enhance support, collaboration and cooperation in scientific research and protective measures for Antarctica.

In 2022 the "Antarctic Climate Change and the Environment" report was published for the Antarctic Treaty Consultative Meeting in Berlin. The report summarises a decade of research on the impact of climate change on Antarctica and the Southern Ocean, and the global effects of these changes. The report's findings were summarised in an animation titled "Our Future Depends on Us".

=== Capacity building ===
The SCAR Capacity Building, Education and Training Advisory Group (SCAR CBET) was established to support national scientific capabilities, especially in developing countries, and to promote the incorporation of Antarctic science into education at all levels.

==== Medals ====
SCAR awards four medals at its biennial Open Science Conferences, in recognition of excellence in Antarctic and Southern Ocean research and outstanding service to the international Antarctic community, these are:

- The Medal for Excellence in Antarctic Research
- The Medal for International Coordination
- The Medal for Education and Communication
- A fourth medal - the President's Medal for Outstanding Achievement - is chosen by the outgoing SCAR President, who awards it on stepping down from office.

==== Visiting scholarships ====
SCAR offers Visiting Scholar Awards, which enable researchers and academics to conduct research stays in other SCAR member countries to promote collaborative exchange and capacity building.

==== Fellowships ====
SCAR provides fellowships to early-career researchers to carry out research in different SCAR member countries.

==== Diversity in Antarctic science ====
As one of the principles of its parent organisation, the International Science Council (ISC), SCAR "promotes equitable opportunities for access to science and its benefits, and opposes discrimination based on such factors as ethnic origin, religion, citizenship, language, political or other opinion, sex, gender identity, sexual orientation, disability, or age."

As part of the push to improve the representation of women on Wikipedia, the SCAR community has already included more than 70 new biographies for notable women in Antarctic research.

The SCAR Action Group on Equality, Diversity, and Inclusion (EDI) was established in 2022 to promote EDI principles within SCAR and the wider community. Activities of the group include analysis of demographic patterns of engagement in SCAR groups and conferences, creating resources, and removing barriers to participation in SCAR and Antarctic research generally (e.g., through translation of key SCAR materials into languages other than English).
