= Chad Greene =

American climate scientist

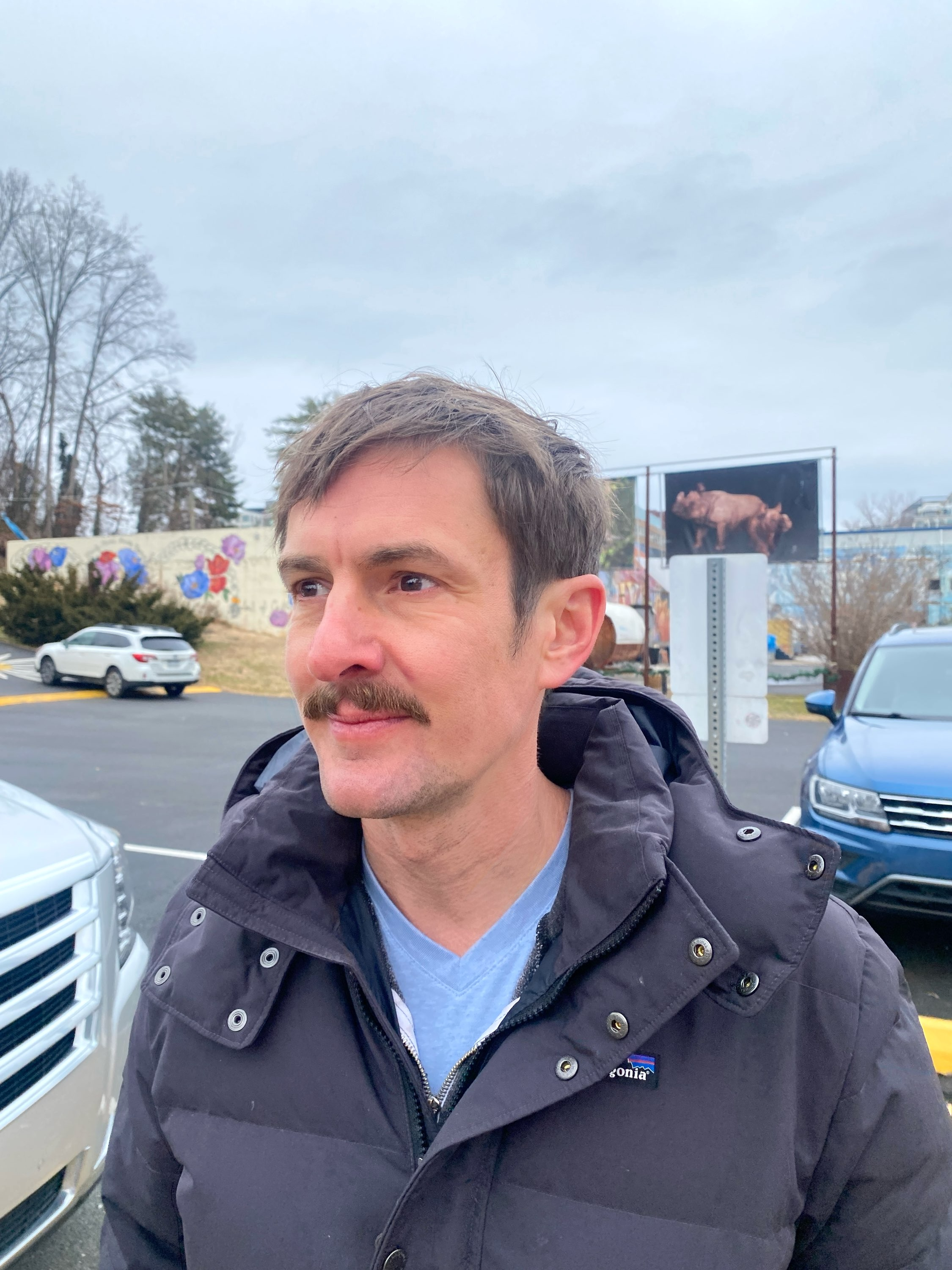
Chad Greene at an event in 2025

Chad Greene is an American scientist at NASA's Jet Propulsion Laboratory, where he specializes in climate science and remote sensing of Earth's glaciers. He is known for leading large-scale assessments of ice sheet response to global warming, leading a NASA campaign in Greenland that mapped Camp Century, Greene is also a musician notable for musical collaborations with singer-songwriter Anna Nalick.

== Early life and education ==
Greene attended public school in rural Powhatan, Virginia, where he played drums in jazz and rock bands with James Wallace, who he would continue to collaborate with musically for decades. He attended Virginia Commonwealth University, where he played drums in a jazz quartet called the Hot Tubs and received a bachelor's degree in mechanical engineering in 2007 with a minor in mathematics. While in college, Greene once cycled over 4200 miles from Florence, Oregon to Kill Devil Hills, North Carolina.

After graduating college, he moved to Austin, Texas, where he studied underwater acoustics and earned a master's degree in mechanical engineering at The University of Texas at Austin in 2010. On an expedition aboard the USCG Polar Sea icebreaker ship in the Beaufort Sea while conducting his masters research in 2009, he developed an interest in arctic fieldwork. In 2011 he began graduate studies in geological sciences and worked at the University of Texas Institute for Geophysics, where he conducted multiple field campaigns in Antarctica and wrote a doctoral thesis on the stability of ice shelves in East Antarctica. In 2017 he received a Ph.D. in geological sciences from The University of Texas at Austin. He completed a postdoctoral research fellowship at Jet Propulsion Laboratory in 2023.

== Scientific works ==
=== Glaciology ===
Chad Greene's scientific research relies on satellite and airborne measurements to assess the magnitude and causes of changes in Earth's glaciers and ice sheets. He led a 2017 study of Antarctica's Totten Glacier that found that its ice-shelf melt rate is influenced by wind-driven ocean dynamics that bring warm ocean waters in contact with the ice shelf. In a follow-on study he discovered the importance of seasonal landfast sea ice in governing the flow of Totten's ice shelf, suggesting that the decline of Antarctica's sea ice could result in acceleration of Totten Glacier and an increased rate of sea level rise. Greene's research on Totten Glacier would later be cited by the Intergovernmental Panel on Climate Change's Special Report on the Ocean and Cryosphere in a Changing Climate and the IPCC Assessment Report 6 Physical Science Basis.

A 2022 report on Antarctica's ice shelves led by Greene was published in the journal Nature and gained traction in popular media due in part to its coincident timing with the passing of the US Inflation Reduction Act of 2022, which allocated major government spending on climate action. Greene's study found that Antarctica's ice shelves lost 36,701 ± 1,465 square kilometres of ice shelf area between 1997 and 2021, that overall Antarctica's ice-shelf area would not recover to pre-2000 extents before another projected round of major calving events produce additional losses, and that ice shelf loss could result in rapid dynamic response of Antarctica's grounded glaciers. The study was widely publicized at the time and Greene discussed the findings on CNN Newsroom With Pamela Brown on August 14, 2022.

In 2024, the journal Nature published another study led by Greene, which found that frontal retreat of Greenland's glaciers has equated to a net loss of 1000 Gt of ice, which had not been not been accounted for or included in community consensus estimates of Greenland's mass loss reported by IMBIE. The findings adjusted previous estimates of Greenland's mass loss by roughly 20% relative to previous estimates of 4892 Gt net loss from 1992 to 2020. The ice lost to glacier retreat in Greenland had not been captured by any of the three methods of observation employed by IMBIE, so the loss reported by Greene represent an additional loss. Curiously, ice lost to retreat in Greenland produces minimal direct net impact on sea level because marine-terminating glaciers typically exist near hydrostatic equilibrium, and most of the volume lost to calving is replaced by seawater. Although the ice sheet loss reported by Greene produced little impact on sea level rise, the findings caused some concern that the additional freshwater input to the ocean could weaken the Atlantic meridional overturning circulation and disrupt global weather patterns. Greene was interviewed by Fredricka Whitfield live on CNN on January 20, 2024 to discuss the potential impacts of his findings.

In April 2024, Greene was the lead scientist aboard a NASA airborne campaign in northern Greenland to map the abandoned Camp Century secret nuclear US Army base buried beneath the surface of the ice. The campaign produced an unprecedented high-resolution radar image of the secret city and garnered significant media attention including radio and television appearances a live interview with Dr. Greene on BBC News. Greene's rediscovery of Camp Century has since become a political issue in Donald Trump's bid to acquire Greenland as a territory of the United States.

In 2025, a study led by Greene was published in the journal Science. The study reported a discovery that Earth's glaciers accelerate each year as a consequence of surface meltwater, and that global warming could cause glaciers to become increasingly sensitive to small changes in temperature.

Greene is currently a research scientist at NASA's Jet Propulsion Laboratory, where he contributes to NASA's ITS_LIVE glacier monitoring project, which uses satellite data to map changes in Earth's glaciers and ice sheets. As polar remote sensing specialist, he monitors ice shelf stability and studies the impacts of climate change on polar bear habitats.

=== Acoustics ===
Chad Greene worked for several years as an acoustician at Applied Research Laboratories. There, he researched underwater acoustics, focusing on methane hydrates, bubble resonance, and the acoustic environments of seagrass meadows. His published works in acoustics include an investigation of passive acoustic monitoring as a method of measuring underwater methane seep ebullition and an introductory course on Helmholtz resonators

=== Software development ===
Chad Greene is a prominent user of MATLAB and has been a major contributor to the MathWorks File Exchange. A repeat winner of the File Exchange Pick-of-the-Week award, in 2016 he received the MathWorks award for Outstanding Contributions. He served on the MathWorks Community Advisory Board from 2016 until stepping down in 2022 to focus on other endeavors. He has spearheaded the creation of several popular MATLAB packages including the Climate Data Toolbox for MATLAB, Antarctic Mapping Tools for MATLAB, the Tide Model Driver for MATLAB, and an ITS_LIVE utility package for MATLAB.

== Music ==
In February 2024, Chad Greene released an indie folk EP titled The Iceman Strummeth, featuring vocal performances by American singer-songwriter Anna Nalick. The album was produced by James Wallace, who also played keyboards and guitars on several tracks.
