= Valter Schytt =

Swedish glaciologist

- Born: 17 October 1919; Solna, Sweden
- Died: 30 March 1985 (aged 65); Sollentuna, Sweden
- Citizenship: Sweden
- Education: Stockholm University
- Awards: Patron's Medal (1981); Vega Medal (1981)
- Scientific career
- Fields: Glaciology
- Workplaces: Stockholm University; Northwestern University; Naturvetenskapliga forskningsrådet

Stig Valter Schytt (17 October 1919 – 30 March 1985) was a Swedish glaciologist.

== Biography ==
Schytt was born at Solna in Stockholm, Sweden. He studied physics and mathematics at Stockholm University and was awarded Master of Philosophy in 1946, Licentiate in 1947 and PhD in 1958. He became a lector in geography at Stockholm University in 1943, glaciologist with the Swedish Antarctic Committee in 1948, research associate at Northwestern University in Evanston, Illinois in 1953 and assistant teacher in geography at Stockholm University in 1955. He became associated with the Swedish Research Council (Naturvetenskapliga forskningsrådet) in 1963, an assistant professor in 1969 and was a professor from 1970. In 1974 he was elected into the Royal Swedish Academy of Sciences.

He participated in the Norwegian-British-Swedish Antarctic Expedition polar expedition to the Antarctic 1949–52. He also participated in important expeditions to Canada in 1954, to Greenland in 1954, to Spitsbergen in 1956, 1957, 1958 and Deception Island in 1977. Schytt is mainly associated with the Ymer-80 expedition carried out by the icebreaker Ymer during the summer of 1980.

Schytt initiated the glacier mass balance studies at Storglaciären in the Tarfala Valley. Started in 1945/46, it is the longest continuous study of this type in the world. He was promoting the Tarfala research station since its start. He died at the research station during a winter visit in March 1985.

== Awards and Recognitions ==
For his outstanding work on the Ymer-80 Expedition, Valter Schytt was awarded the Vega Medal, the highest award of the Swedish Society for Anthropology and Geography, in 1981. Also in 1981, Valter was awarded the Patron's Medal from the Royal Geographical Society.

Schytt Glacier in Antarctica was named in honour of Stig Valter Schytt.

== Related reading ==
- Valter Schytt, Kurt Boström & Christian Hjort (1981) Geoscience during the Ymer-80 expedition to the Arctic (Geologiska Föreningen i Stockholm Förhandlingar. Volume 103, Issue 1)
