= Tarfala research station =

Glacial and climatological station in northern Sweden

Coordinates: 67°54′40″N 18°36′40″E

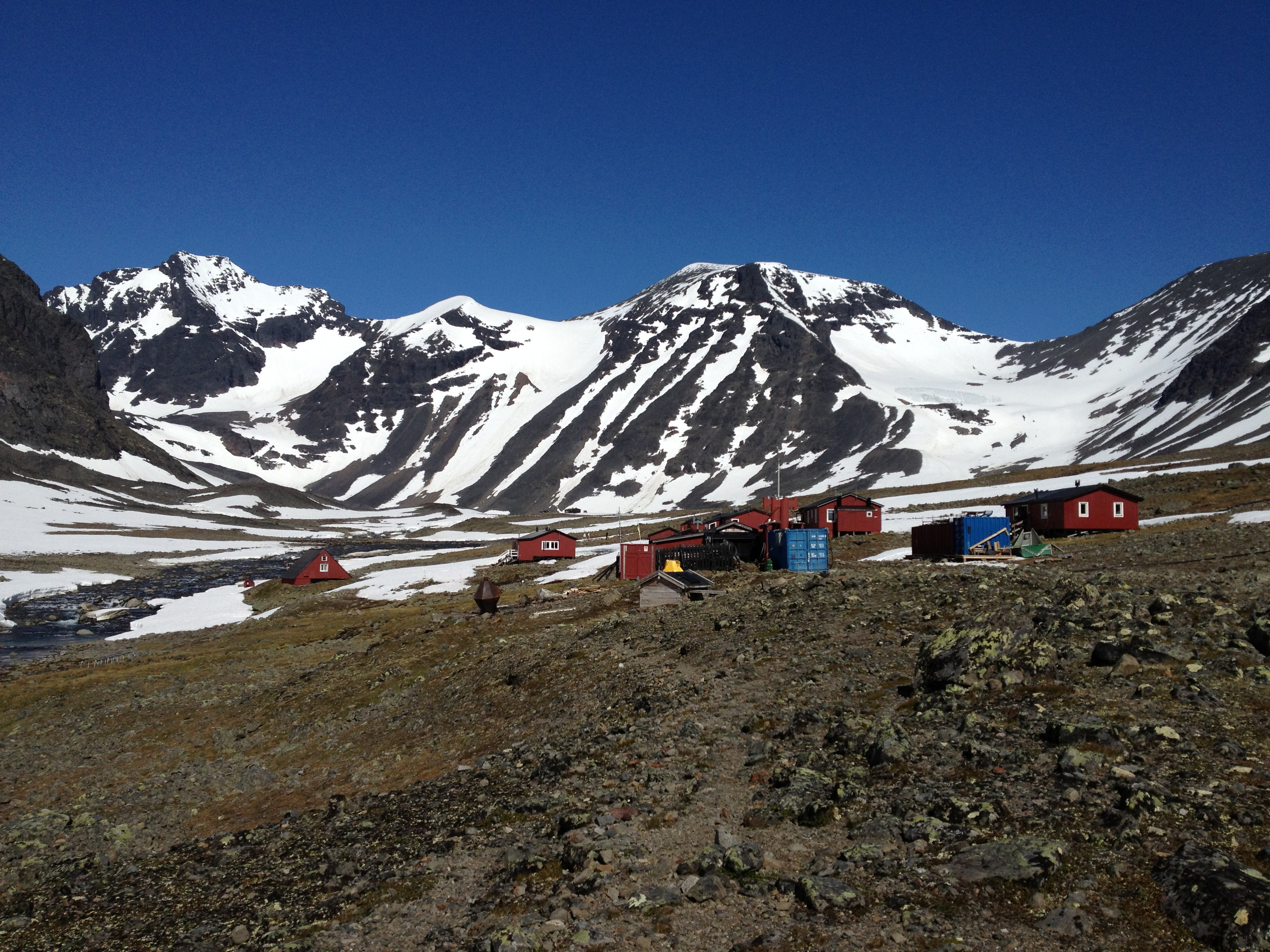
Tarfala research station

The Tarfala research station (Swedish: Tarfala forskningstation) is a field station of Stockholm University. The station is situated in the Tarfala Valley in northern Sweden. It specializes in glacial, periglacial and climatological research.

It was here at Storglaciären that the first glacier mass balance program was initiated immediately after World War II. This glaciological program is continued to present day and thus constitutes the longest continuous study of this type in the world. In 1976, the first systematic studies on mountain permafrost in Scandinavia were started using Tarfala research station as main research base. Several years of field measurements proved, that Tarfala research station is located in a zone of widespread discontinuous permafrost. Today, Tarfala research station is a well known research place for studies on glaciers, mountain climate, periglacial geomorphology and alpine vegetation.

== Geography ==
The station is situated in the Tarfala Valley in Swedish Lapland at an elevation of 1135 meters, and about 150 kilometres north of the Arctic Circle. The station is ideally located at the foot of Kebnekaise, the highest mountain in Sweden. The station is surrounded by several glaciers. The largest are Storglaciären, Isfallsglaciären, Kebnepakteglaciären and Tarfalaglaciären.

== Tarfala research station ==
Hans Wilhelmsson Ahlmann, a well-known Swedish geographer and glaciologist, was a leading personality with expeditions to Svalbard, Iceland and Greenland already in the 1930s. After World War II, he suggested regular studies also of the glaciers in the Kebnekaise area. Valter Schytt and other glaciologists proposed Storglaciären at Tarfala as ideal location for long-term glacier mass balance studies. Regular glaciological measurements started already in 1946, with a gauging station downstream of Storglaciären.

Valter Schytt remained the leading personality and promoted the development of the research station until his death in 1985. The number of station buildings gradually increased and annual university courses at Tarfala Research Station could start in 1959. Tarfala Research station was officially opened as a research station of Stockholms University in 1961 and expanded by four buildings through a grant from the Wallenberg Foundation. A sauna, a laboratory, a lecture hall and additional living quarters were added in the following years. Winter storm destroyed some buildings in 1975, 1985 and 1993; spring slush avalanches damaged the laboratory hut in 1982 and again in 1991. The damaged buildings were repaired or reconstructed during the following summers.

Research was focused on glaciology, hydrology and climate. The good location inmidst of glaciers and lakes, and the increasingly good infrastructure of the research station attracted scientists from other Swedish universities. The long-term station director Valter Schytt always welcomed scientists and students from abroad, too. In 1985, Valter Schytt died in Tarfala valley during a winter visit. In 1995/96, fifty years of research activities in Tarfala were celebrated and Per Holmlund is appointed as director for Tarfala Research Station.

== Climate and Climate change ==
=== Climate ===
Systematic climatological measurements at Tarfala station exist since 1961 and are continued till today.

Climate data for Tarfala 1991–2020 (1144 m)
Month	Jan	Feb	Mar	Apr	May	Jun	Jul	Aug	Sep	Oct	Nov	Dec	Year
Record high °C (°F)	8.2 (46.8)	6.0 (42.8)	9.1 (48.4)	10.8 (51.4)	15.7 (60.3)	18.8 (65.8)	23.6 (74.5)	21.2 (70.2)	17.7 (63.9)	13.7 (56.7)	10.3 (50.5)	8.0 (46.4)	23.6 (74.5)
Mean daily maximum °C (°F)	−6.8 (19.8)	−7.2 (19.0)	−6.3 (20.7)	−2.5 (27.5)	1.9 (35.4)	6.9 (44.4)	11.2 (52.2)	9.5 (49.1)	5.0 (41.0)	−0.6 (30.9)	−3.5 (25.7)	−5.5 (22.1)	0.2 (32.3)
Daily mean °C (°F)	−10.2 (13.6)	−10.5 (13.1)	−9.2 (15.4)	−6.0 (21.2)	−1.3 (29.7)	3.8 (38.8)	8.0 (46.4)	6.7 (44.1)	2.3 (36.1)	−3.3 (26.1)	−6.7 (19.9)	−8.7 (16.3)	−2.9 (26.7)
Mean daily minimum °C (°F)	−14.0 (6.8)	−14.3 (6.3)	−12.9 (8.8)	−9.5 (14.9)	−4.4 (24.1)	1.0 (33.8)	4.9 (40.8)	4.3 (39.7)	0.2 (32.4)	−5.9 (21.4)	−10.0 (14.0)	−12.2 (10.0)	−6.1 (21.1)
Record low °C (°F)	−31.9 (−25.4)	−32.8 (−27.0)	−25.0 (−13.0)	−20.7 (−5.3)	−18.4 (−1.1)	−9.2 (15.4)	−2.8 (27.0)	−5.2 (22.6)	−11.0 (12.2)	−19.0 (−2.2)	−25.0 (−13.0)	−25.4 (−13.7)	−32.8 (−27.0)
Source 1: SMHI
Source 2: NOAA

Climate data for Tarfala, 1961–2011
Month	Jan	Feb	Mar	Apr	May	Jun	Jul	Aug	Sep	Oct	Nov	Dec	Year
Mean daily maximum °C (°F)	−8.3 (17.1)	−8.0 (17.6)	−7.5 (18.5)	−3.9 (25.0)	1.1 (34.0)	6.5 (43.7)	9.9 (49.8)	8.5 (47.3)	3.8 (38.8)	−1.4 (29.5)	−5.4 (22.3)	−7.4 (18.7)	−1.0 (30.2)
Daily mean °C (°F)	−11.8 (10.8)	−11.3 (11.7)	−10.6 (12.9)	−7.5 (18.5)	−1.9 (28.6)	3.2 (37.8)	6.4 (43.5)	5.3 (41.5)	0.8 (33.4)	−3.9 (25.0)	−7.9 (17.8)	−10.7 (12.7)	−4.6 (23.7)
Mean daily minimum °C (°F)	−15.3 (4.5)	−14.6 (5.7)	−13.7 (7.3)	−11.1 (12.0)	−5.0 (23.0)	−0.1 (31.8)	2.9 (37.2)	2.1 (35.8)	−2.2 (28.0)	−6.4 (20.5)	−10.3 (13.5)	−14.0 (6.8)	−8.2 (17.2)

The valley is sometimes hit by katabatic winds, which can generate very high wind speeds. The Swedish record of measured wind speed is from Tarfala research station with 81 m/s (290 km/h) on 20 December 1992.

=== Glaciology and climate change ===
The mass balance of a glacier is the difference between accumulation and ablation (sublimation and melting). A glacier with a sustained negative balance is out of equilibrium and will retreat, while one with a sustained positive balance is out of equilibrium and will advance. The determination of the mass balance requires time consuming field work. The winter mass balance is taken in the end of winter by measuring and probing snowpack depth in snow pits at the accumulation zone. Thus the past winters residual snowpack is analysed by its depth and density. In the ablation zone, ablation measurements are made using stakes inserted vertically into the glacier, usually at the end of the previous melt season. At the end of the melt (ablation) season, the length of stake exposed by melting ice is measured. Most stakes must be replaced each year. Mass balance results have been regularly published by Schytt and Holmlund.

The climate in the Tarfala valley is quite continental, compared with the regions west of the Kebnekaise; the climate in western Norway is maritime. This steep climatic gradient influences also both the net balance gradients on glaciers and the glaciation level. The average annual precipitation is about 1000 mm at Tarfala Research Station. This is less than half of the precipitation in the Norwegian mountains to the west. The mean annual air temperature at the equilibrium line at about 1500 m a.s.l. is about -6 °C.

Regular glaciological measurements at Storglaciären were started in 1946. In 1968, a new gauging station was built, and the International Hydrological Decade (IHD) spawned its hydrological activities also in the Tarfala valley. Today, the glacier mass balance program at Storglaciären is globally known as one of the most important glaciological records and supplies important data to climate change questions in subarctic mountain regions.

=== Permafrost and climate change ===
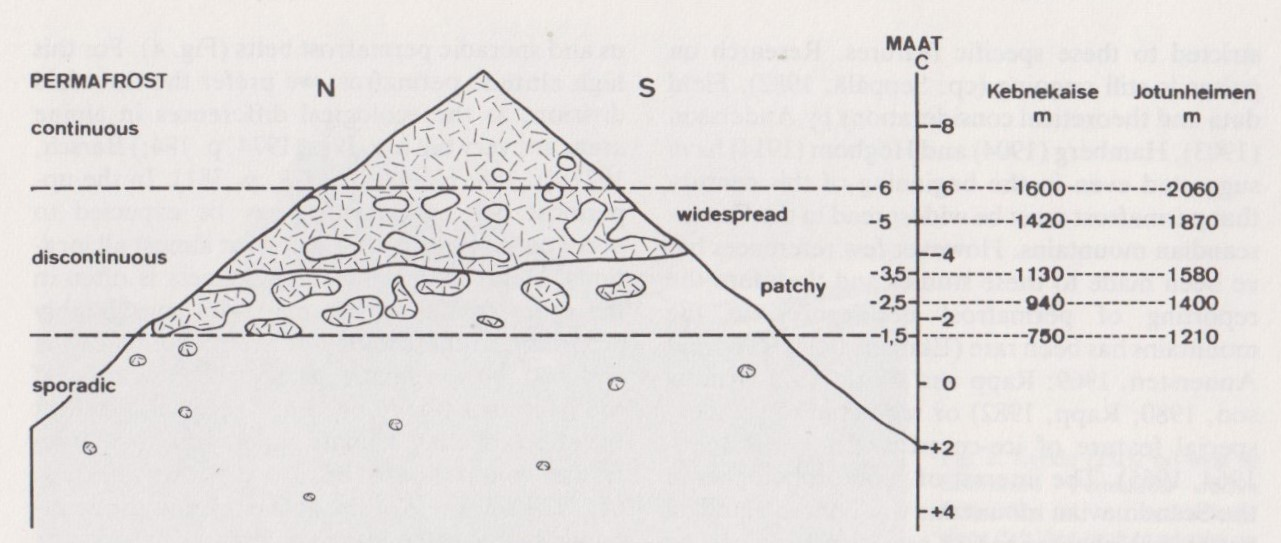
Altitudinal zonation of mountain permafrost for Tarfala (Kebnekaise) and Jotunheimen (Norway) with corresponding mean annual air temperatures (MAAT)

Whereas permafrost occurrences in palsa bogs were well known already in the beginning of the 20th century and many permafrost studies were done on Spitzbergen, it was doubted until the early 1980s that mountain permafrost is present in the Scandinavian mountains. Its widespread existence at Tarfala could be proved in 1976 with refraction seismic soundings. It was demonstrated clearly, that Tarfala valley belongs to the region of discontinuous mountain permafrost. The active layer thickness on protalus ramparts and other wind exposed ridges was up to two meters. Four years of systematic permafrost research in the Tarfala valley followed during the years 1977 till 1980, applying different geophysical methods (seismic and DC-geoelectrical soundings in summer, continuous measurements of the ground temperatures in boreholes to get the mean annual ground temperature). In March 1980, measurement of the basal temperature of the snow cover and snow distribution were used to secure the findings. The field studies allowed to sketch a reliable picture of the permafrost distribution in the Kebnekaise region. Detailed results were published in 1982 and later on.

The studies were enlarged to the areas north of Tarfala (Abisko region, Lyngen Peninsula in Norway). Additional studies covered the mountain ranges in the south of the Scandinavian mountain range (Jotunheimen, Rondane, Dovrefjell). The resulting habilitation thesis was dedicated to the memory of Valter Schytt. A summary of the results was printed in Geografiska Annaler. Thus, Tarfala station is located inmidst of the discontinuous permafrost zone, with a MAAT of −3.5 °C (25.7 °F) at an elevation of 1,130 metres (3,710 ft). At 1,600 metres (5,200 ft) above sea level, the continuous permafrost zone will be reached.

Within the EU-sponsored project PACE (Permafrost and Climate in Europe), two boreholes in bedrock, 100 m and 15 m deep were drilled in March 2000. The location is above the research station at an altitude of 1540 meters and near Tarfalaglaciären. The thermistor chain in the 100 m hole includes 30 thermistors. The depth of the Zero Annual Amplitude (ZAA) is 15 to 20 meters with a temperature of -3.2 °C in the year 2000. The ground temperature at a depth of 100 meters is -2.75 °C. The geothermal gradient of 1.17 °C /100 m allows to extrapolate a permafrost thickness of 330 meters, and thus confirms suggestions done with the results of earlier geoelectric soundings.

Warming trend of the air temperatures due to climate change is reflected also in the ground temperatures. The geothermal gradient in the uppermost 50 meters hint to a significant temperature increase during at least 50 years.

== Gallery ==
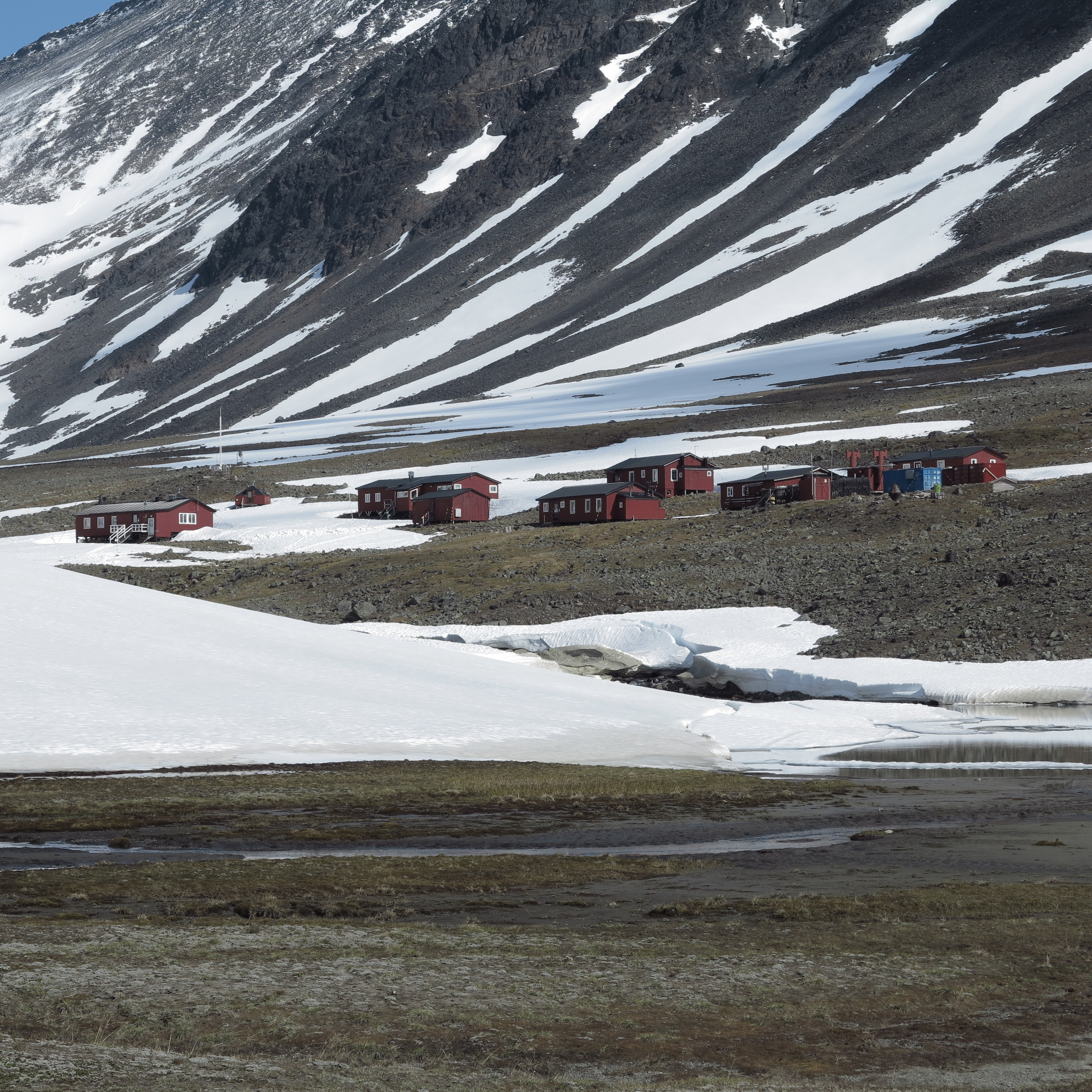

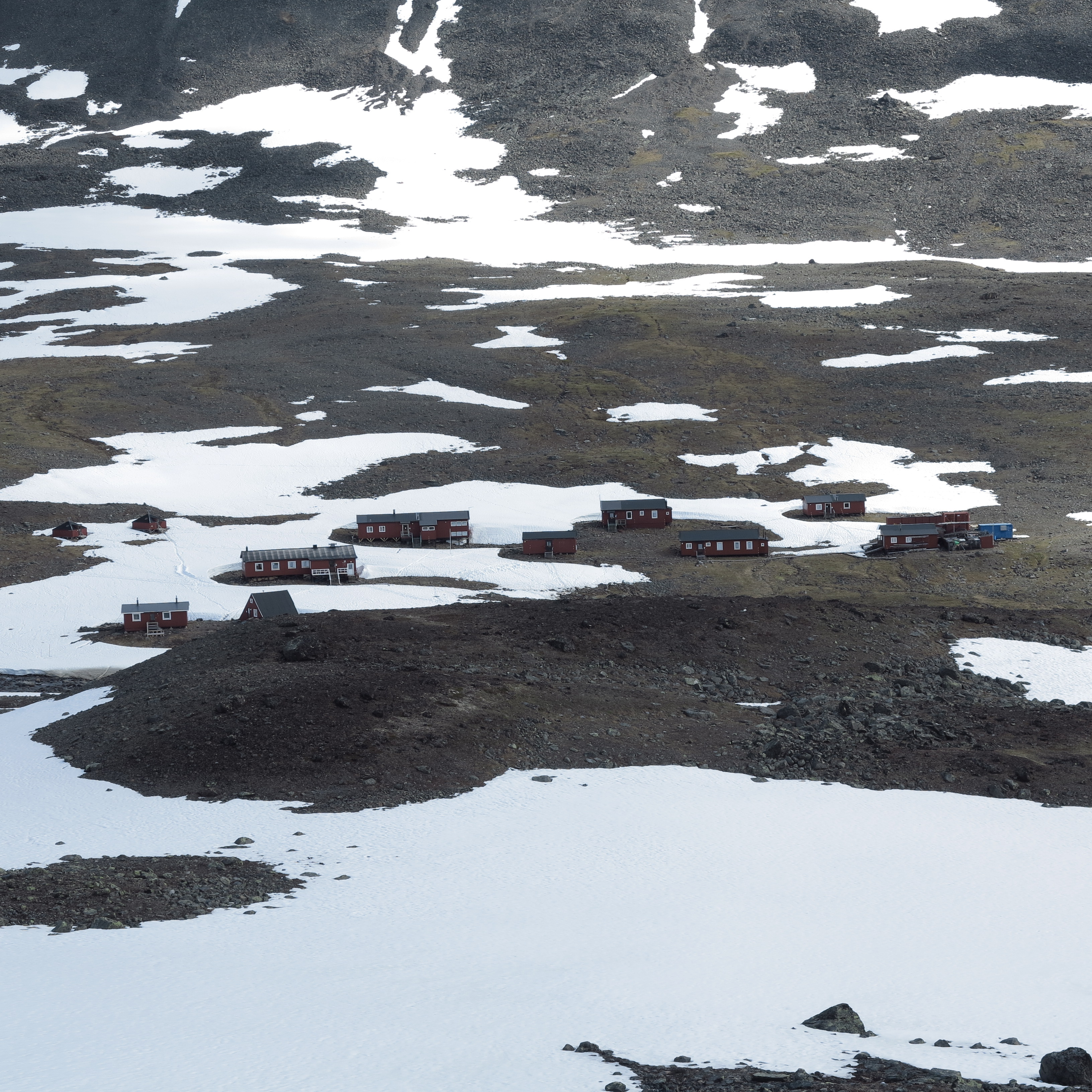

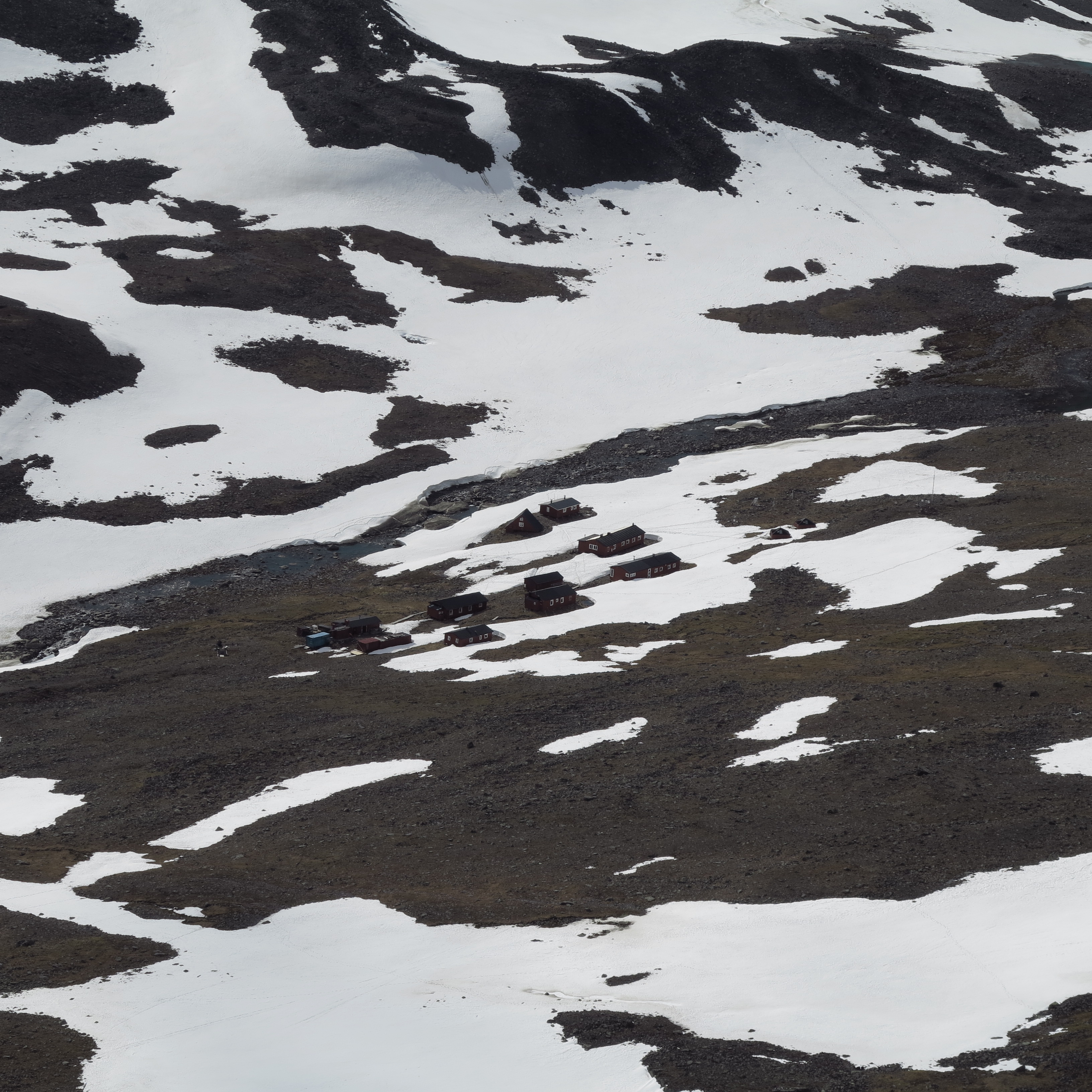

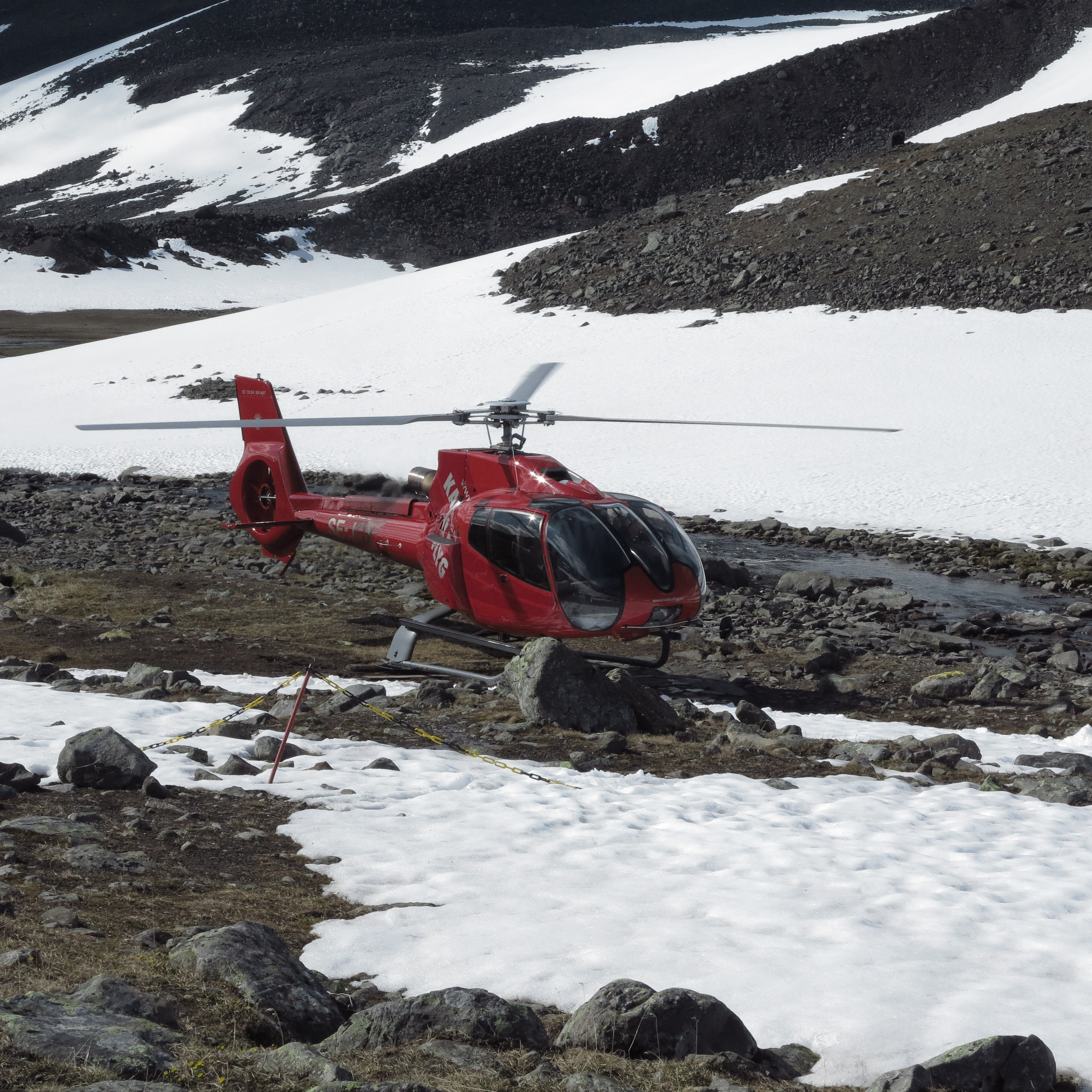

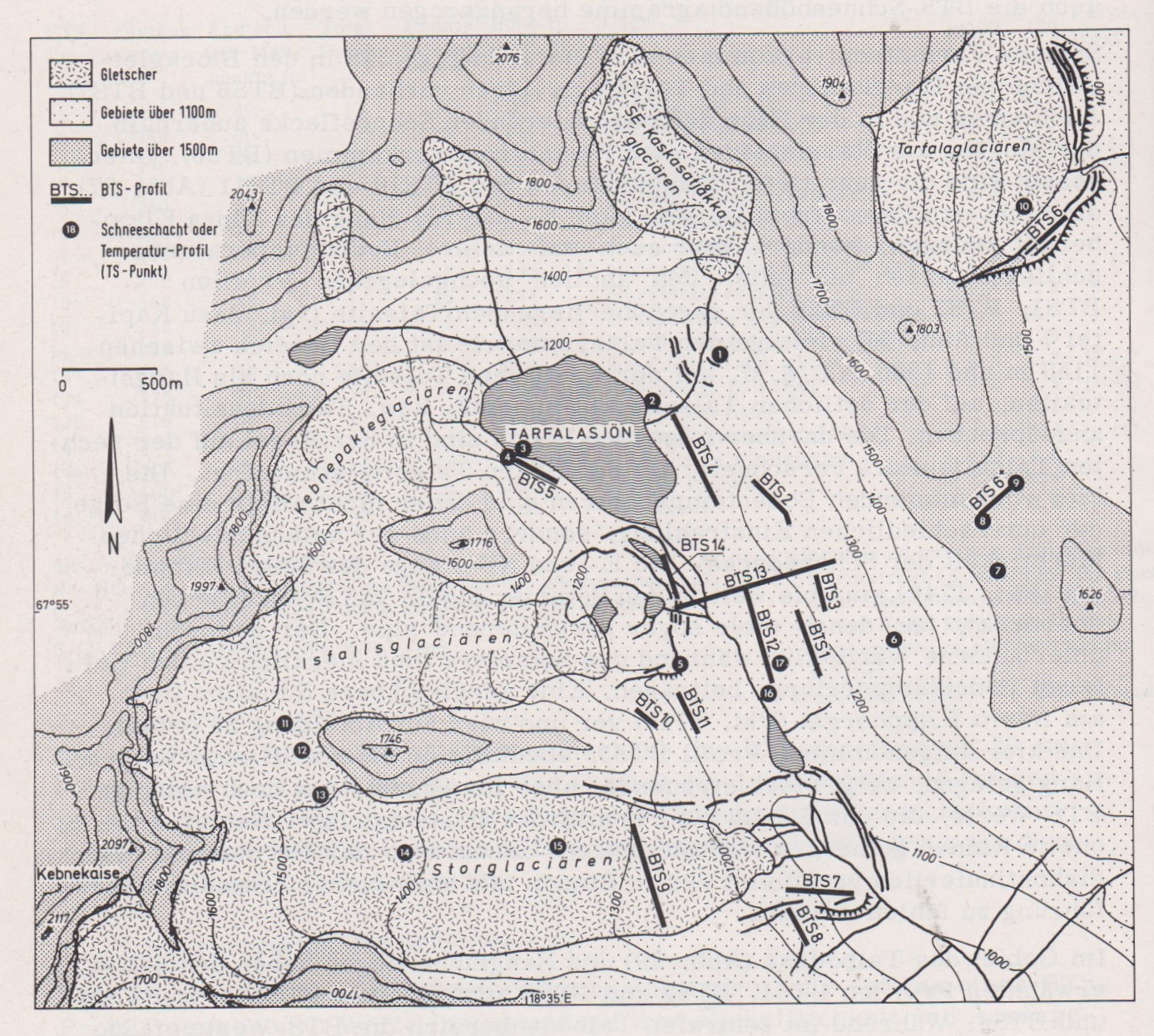
Measurements of the basal temperature of the snow cover end of winter. Several hundred measurements give an indication to probable permafrost sites, Tarfala, Kebnekaise.

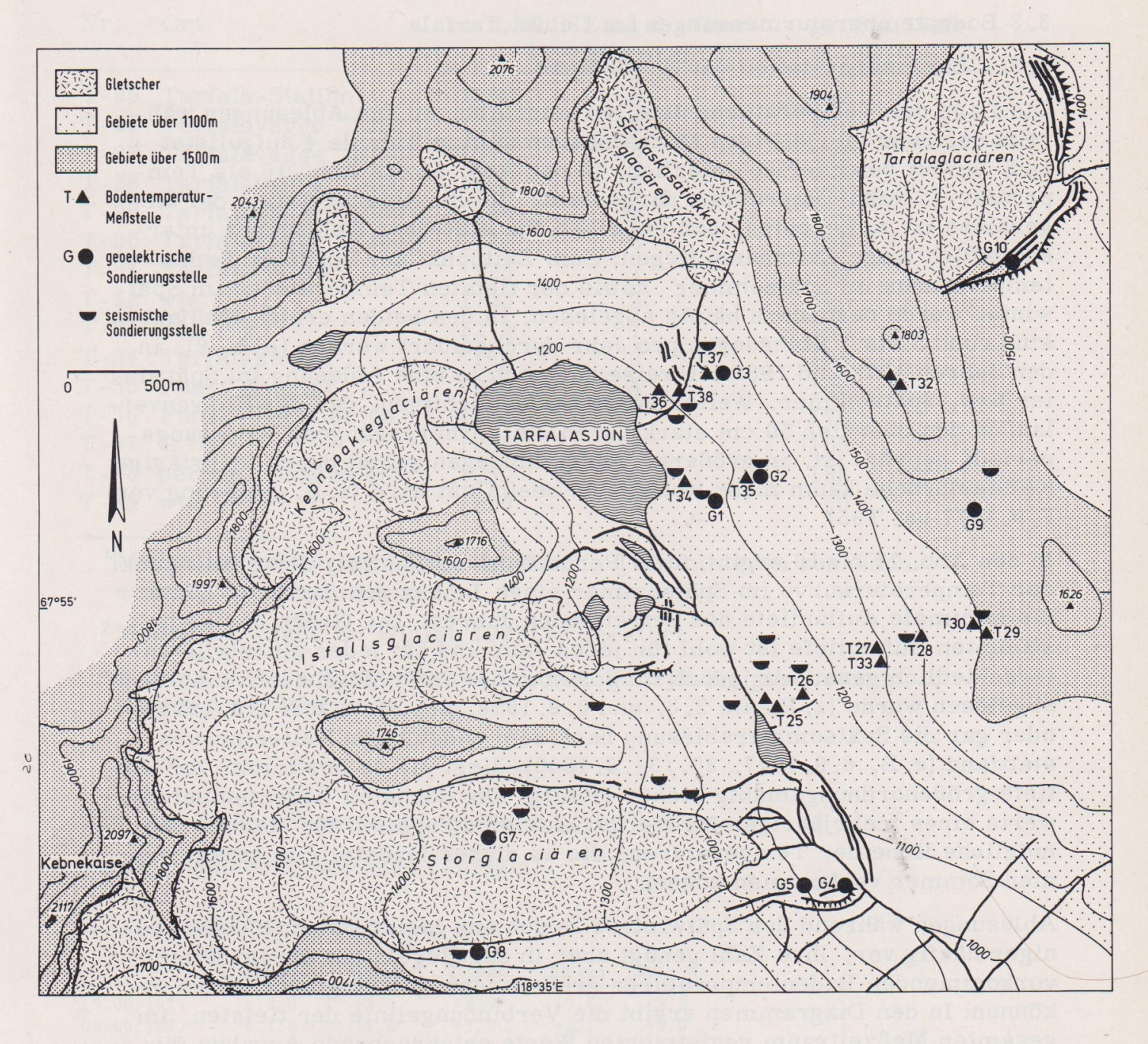
Soil temperature recordings, refraction seismic and DC-geoelectric soundings confirm that Tarfala area shows widespread permafrost occurrences above 1100 m a.s.l.

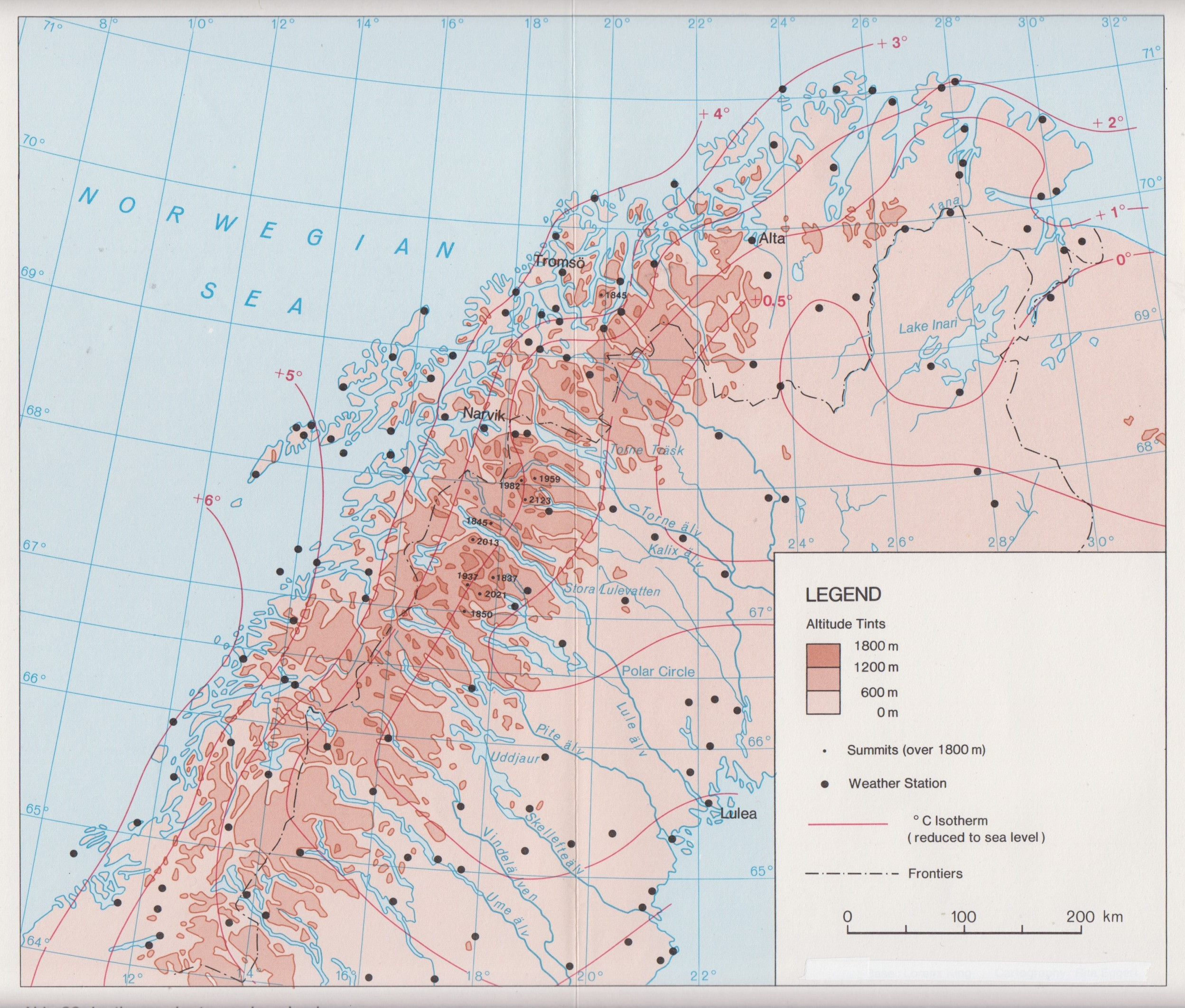
Isotherm map of Lapland showing a strong maritime/continental contrast from west to east. A MAAT of +2 °C (reduced to sea level altitude) corresponds to a MAAT of about -4 °C at 1200 m a.s.l., a region where permafrost patches may be expected in all favored, wind exposed sites. In areas above 1600 meters and at a MAAT of -6 °C continuous permafrost probably exists (King, 1984).
