= James Wallace & the Naked Light =

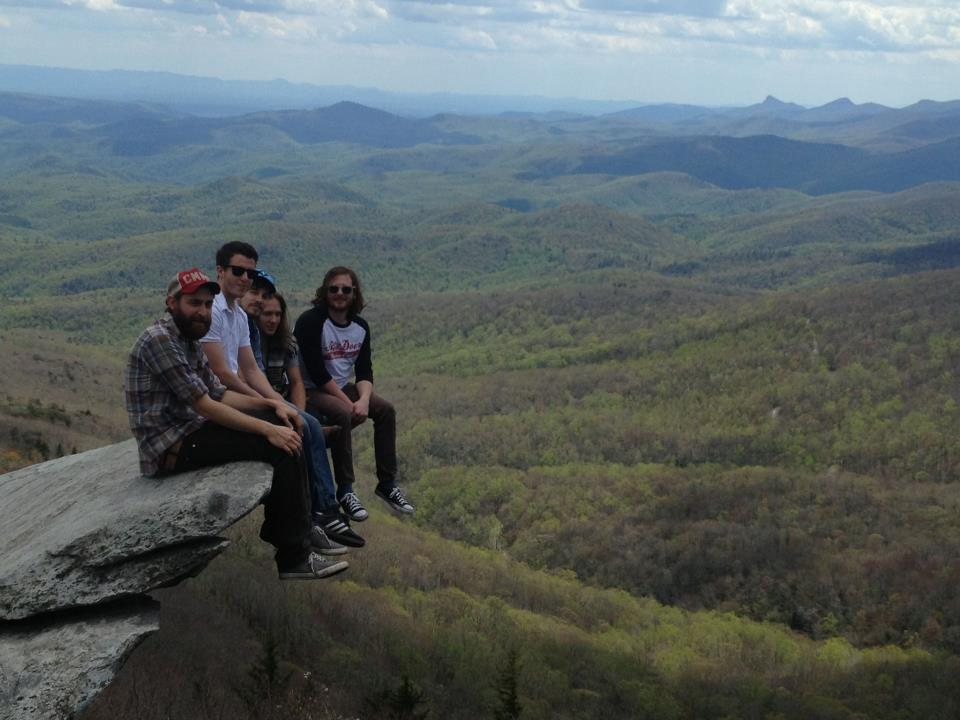

Background information
- Origin: Boone, North Carolina, United States
- Genres: Indie rock, folk rock, psychedelic folk
- Years active: 2009–present
- Label: Dialog Records
- Members: James Wallace; Pinson Chanselle; Matt White; Nate Mathews; Scott Clark; Aaron Williams; John Lilley
- Website: www.jwatnl.com

James Wallace & the Naked Light is an American folk/rock band based in Nashville, Tennessee. The band's influences include American gospel music, Paul Simon, and The Kinks. They have performed at the Bonnaroo Music Festival and the Summer Camp Music Festival. The group's leader, James Wallace, has toured and co-written songs with banjo player Abigail Washburn. Brittany Howard of Alabama Shakes lists them as one of her favorite live acts. In 2013, they recorded a Daytrotter Session and their video "To The River" was chosen as a Vimeo "Staff Pick." Since 2016, Wallace has performed under the moniker Skyway Man.

== Discography ==
=== Studio albums ===
- I Smile All Day I Smile All Night (2009)
- More Strange News from Another Star (2013)
