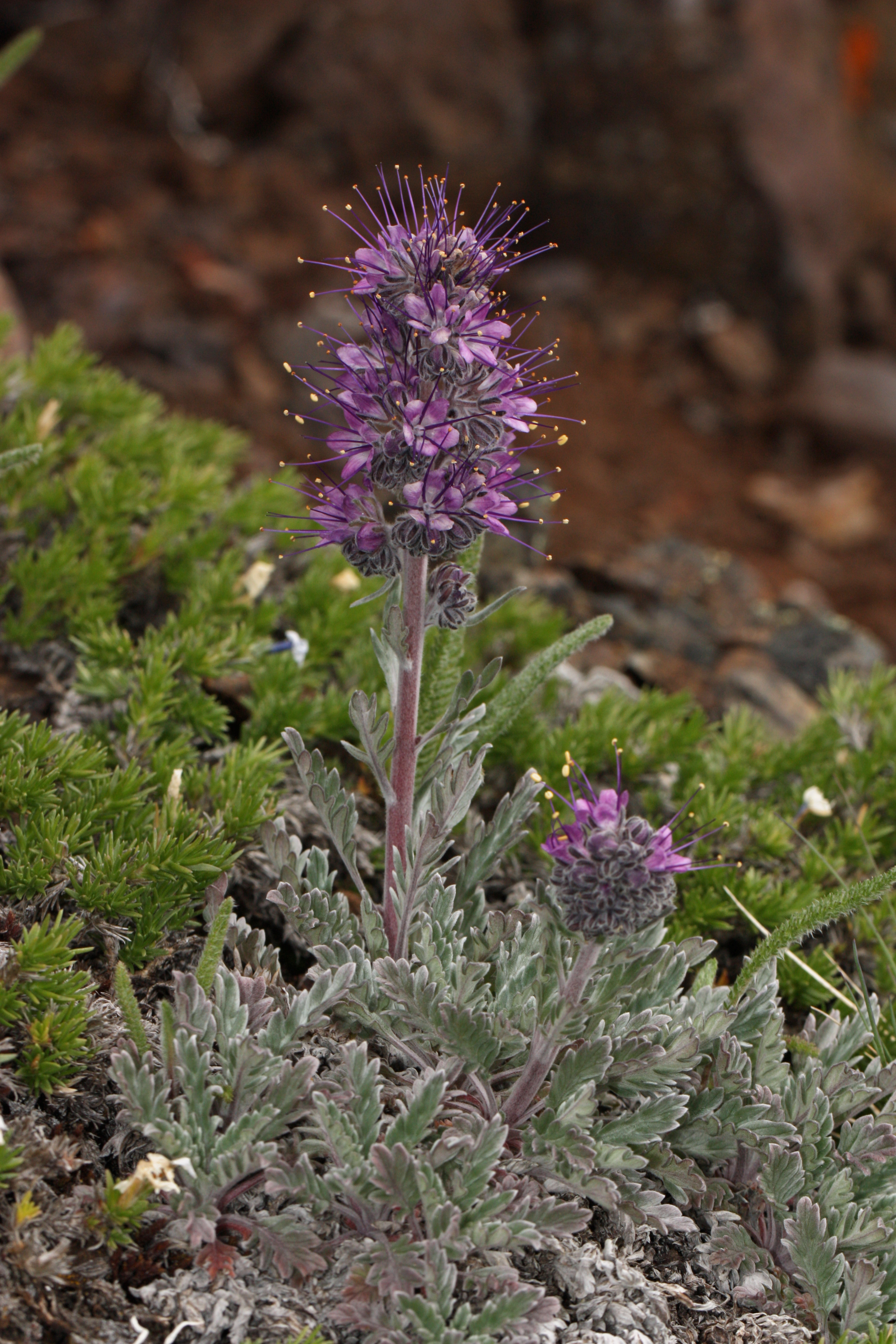
- P. sericea ssp. sericea

Conservation status
- Secure (NatureServe)

Scientific classification
- Kingdom: Plantae
- Clade: Tracheophytes
- Clade: Angiosperms
- Clade: Eudicots
- Clade: Asterids
- Order: Boraginales
- Family: Boraginaceae
- Genus: Phacelia
- Species: P. sericea

Binomial name
- Phacelia sericea (Graham) A. Gray

Subspecies
- P. sericea ssp. ciliosa (Rydb.) Gillett; P. sericea ssp. sericea (Graham) A. Gray

= Phacelia sericea =

Species of plant

Phacelia sericea, the silky phacelia, blue alpine phacelia, or purple fringe, is a showy perennial species of Phacelia endemic to western North America. It grows mainly at subalpine to alpine elevations in forest openings or above treeline among rocks and sand. Sericea comes from the Latin sericeus, or silky, referring to the fine hairs on the leaves and stem.

== Description ==
Phacelia sericea consists of several upright or ascending stems to 0.6 metres (2 ft 0 in) from a tap-rooted, branched woody base. Its leaves are pinnatifid with cleft or entire segments. The basal leaves are somewhat larger than the upper cauline leaves and are more persistent and petiolate. The leaves and stems are generally covered with silvery silky hairs but are scarcely glandular.

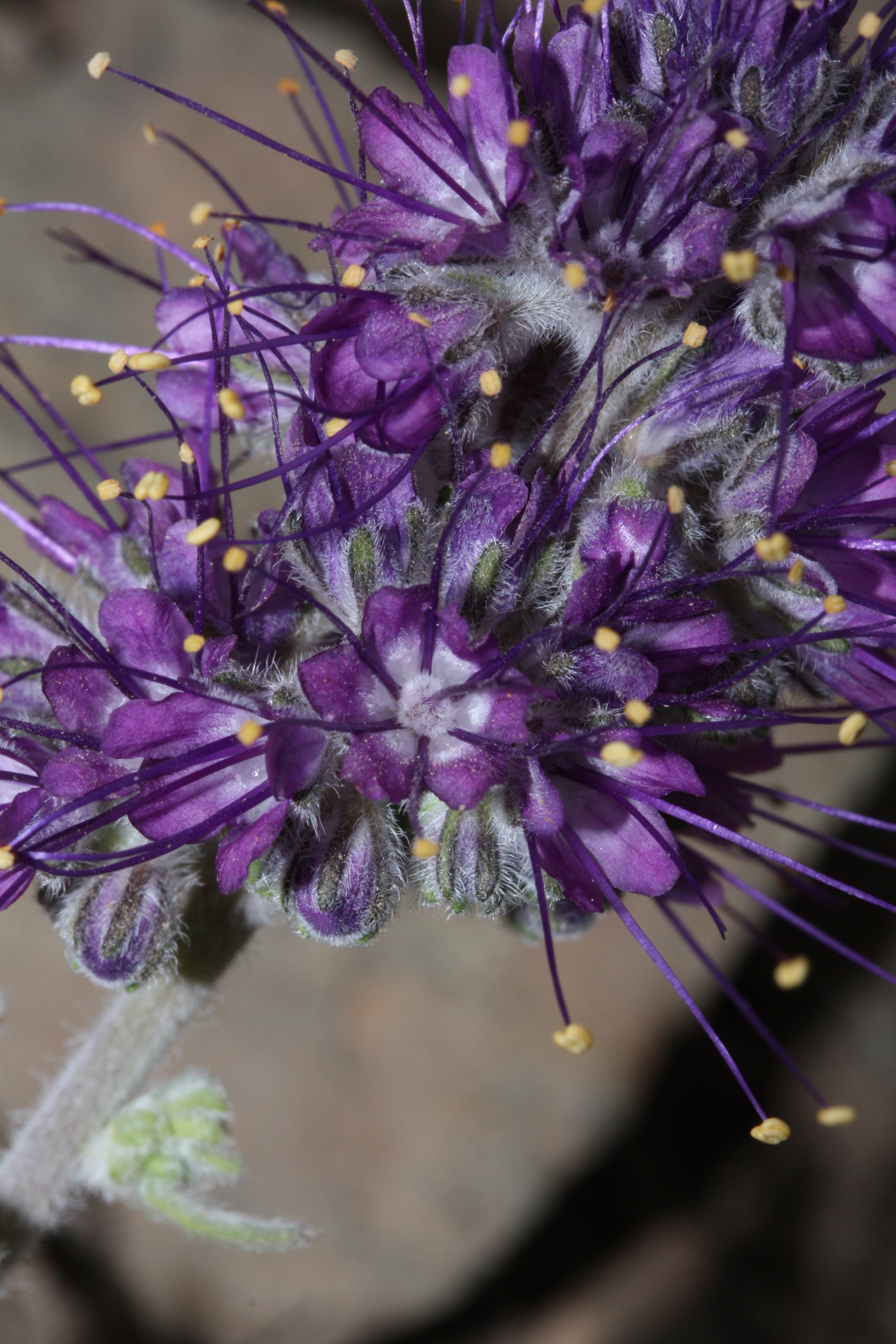
P. sericea ssp. sericea flower

The inflorescence consists of several short panicles, tightly packed, at the end of the stem, resembling a bottle-brush. The dark blue to purple bell-shaped corolla is 4–6 millimetres (0.16–0.24 in) across. It is hairy inside and out but not glandular. The filaments are two to three times as long as the corolla and give the inflorescence a fuzzy appearance. The anthers are bright yellow or orange and the style is shortly cleft. The fruit consists of two-chambered capsules with 8 to 18 seeds.

== Range and Habitat ==
Phacelia sericea is a subalpine to alpine species of open well-drained slopes, usually above 1,500 metres (4,900 ft) elevation, it is found in the mountains of Vancouver Island, the southern British Columbia Pacific Ranges, the Rocky Mountains from Banff National Park to southern Colorado, Olympic National Park, the Cascade Range of Washington, the mountains of eastern Oregon and the northernmost counties of California, and the mountains of Idaho, Nevada and Utah. It generally blooms from near the end of May through the end of August.

== Subspecies ==
Two subspecies are recognized.

- Phacelia sericea subsp. ciliosa is distributed from Oregon and California east to Wyoming and Colorado.
- Phacelia sericea subsp. sericea is restricted to the Rocky Mountains, Alaska, British Columbia and Washington. The latter is smaller, more densely hairy, shorter, i.e., less than 0.3 m (1 ft), with relatively narrow and blunt leaf segments.

Where the ranges overlap, P. sericea ssp. ciliosa occurs at a lower elevation than ssp. sericea. These are listed as subspecies by the USDA PLANTS database and ITIS, and as varieties by Jepson and Hitchcock.

== Uses ==
Phacelia sericea is listed by the Federal Highway Administration as a native species suitable for landscaping along roadsides in Colorado. It should be handled with care as the long flower hairs have been reported to irritate skin.
