= Tarfala Valley =

Valley in Kiruna Municipality, Sweden

- Tarfaladalen, Tarfalavagge, Darfalvággi
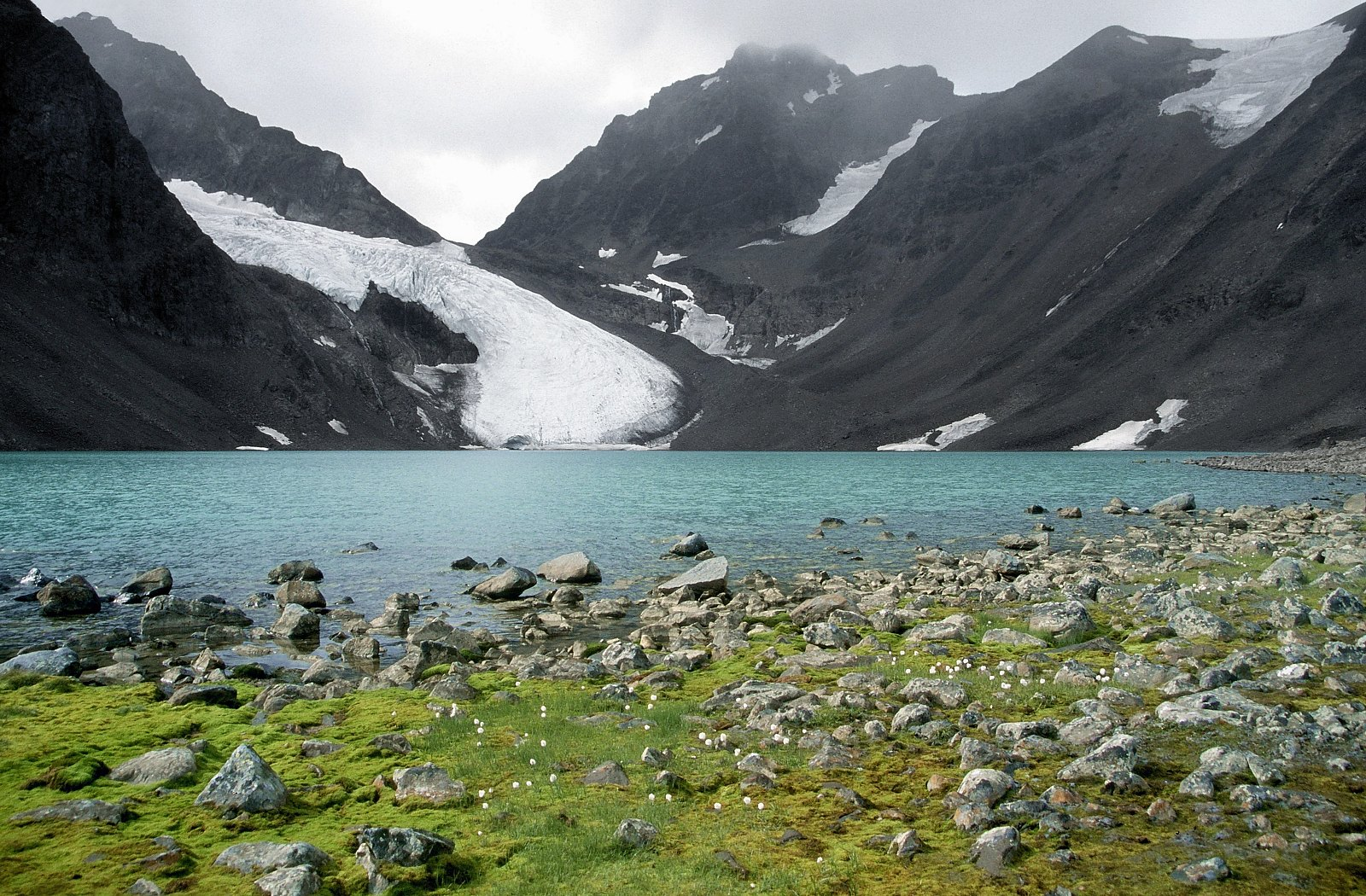

- Location within Sweden

Geography
- Location: Sweden, Norrbotten, Kiruna
- Coordinates: 67°55′N 18°36′E
- Interactive map of Tarfala Valley

Tarfala Valley (Swedish: Tarfaladalen or Tarfalavagge, Northern Sami: Darfalvággi) is a valley in Kiruna Municipality, Sweden. Several glaciers flow into the valley and glaciological research has been conducted since 1946 at the Tarfala scientific station.

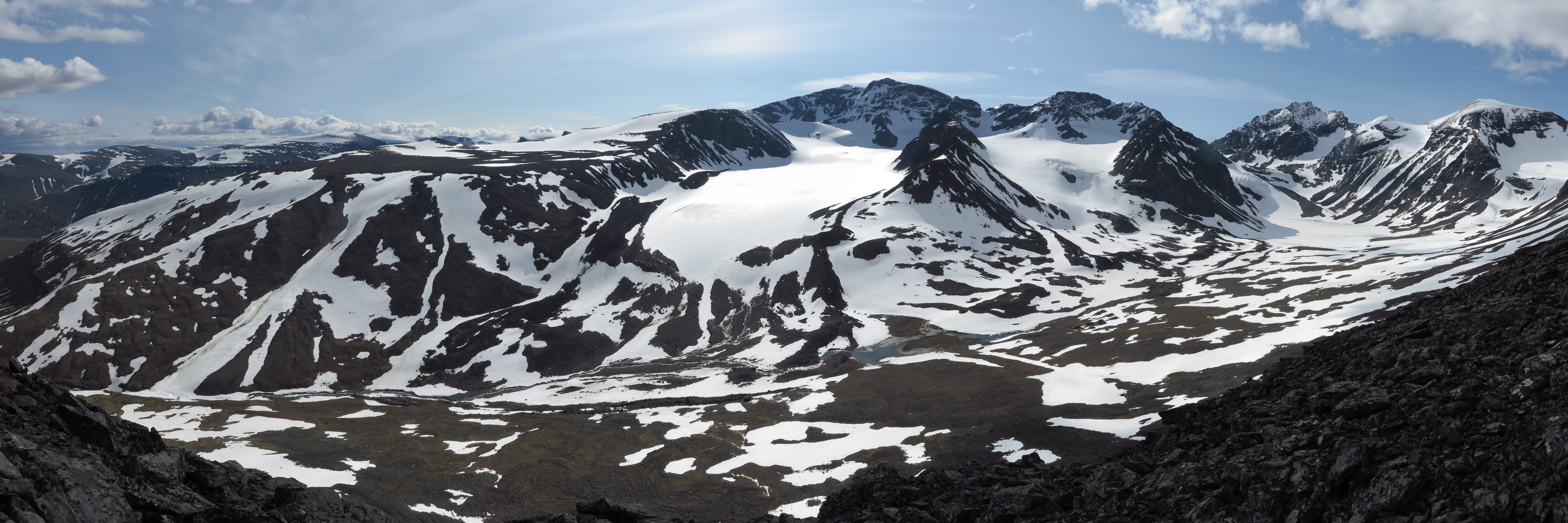

== See also ==
- Kebnekaise
- Tarfala research station
- Storglaciären
- Isfallsglaciären
- Kebnepakteglaciären
