= Storglaciären =

Glacier in Sweden

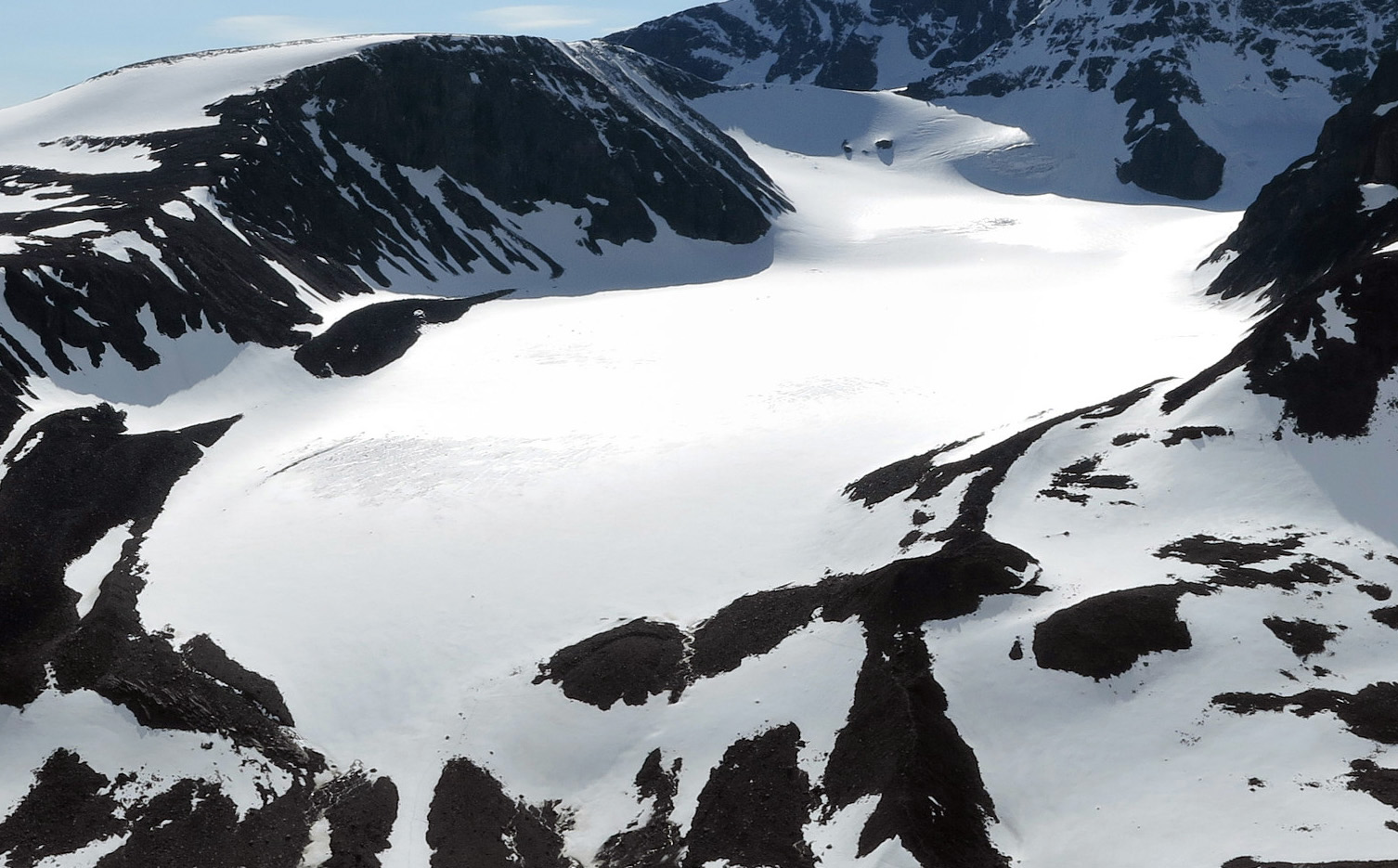
- Overview of Storglaciären, June 2014
- Interactive map of Storglaciären
- Type: Polythermal subarctic-alpine valley glacier
- Location: Kiruna Municipality, Sweden
- Coordinates: 67°54′10″N 18°34′00″E
- Area: 3.1 km^{2} (1.2 mi^{2})
- Length: 3.5 km (2.2 mi)
- Thickness: Average: 93 m (305 ft); Maximum: 255 m (837 ft)
- Status: Retreating since 1910

Storglaciären (Swedish for The Great Glacier) is a glacier in Tarfala Valley in the Scandinavian Mountains of Kiruna Municipality, Sweden. The glacier is classified as polythermal having both cold and warm bottom temperatures. It was on Storglaciären that the first glacier mass balance research program began (immediately after World War II), which continues to the present day; this is the longest continuous study of its type in the world. Storglaciären has had a cumulative negative mass balance of -17 m between 1946 and 2006. The program began monitoring the Rabots Glaciär in 1982, Riukojietna in 1985, and Mårmaglaciären in 1988. All three of these glaciers have had a strong negative mass balance since monitoring began.

For the purpose of studying Storglaciären and nearby glaciers, Stockholm University operates the Tarfala research station in the Kebnekaise region of northern Sweden.

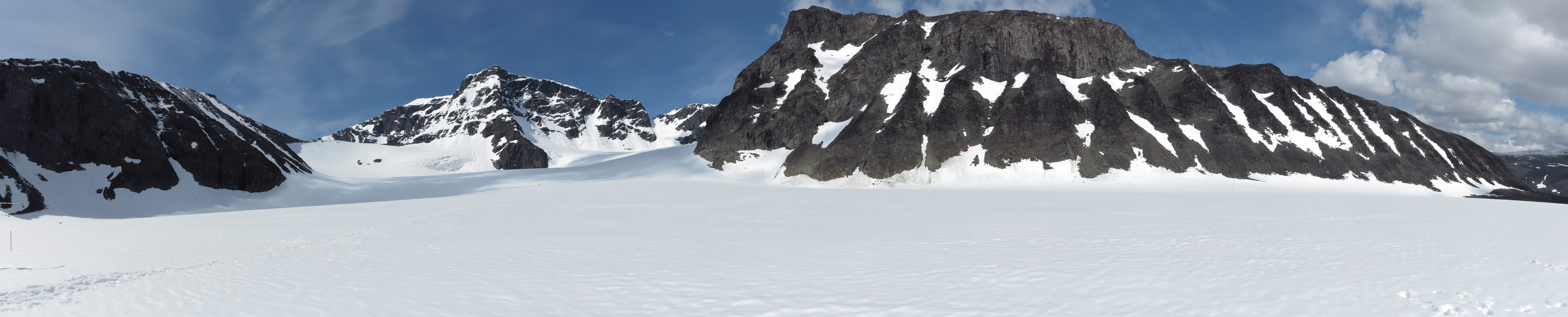
Panorama taken from ca. 1300-1400 meters above the sea level.

== See also ==
- Ice sheet dynamics
