= Library classification =

Systems of coding and organizing documents or library materials

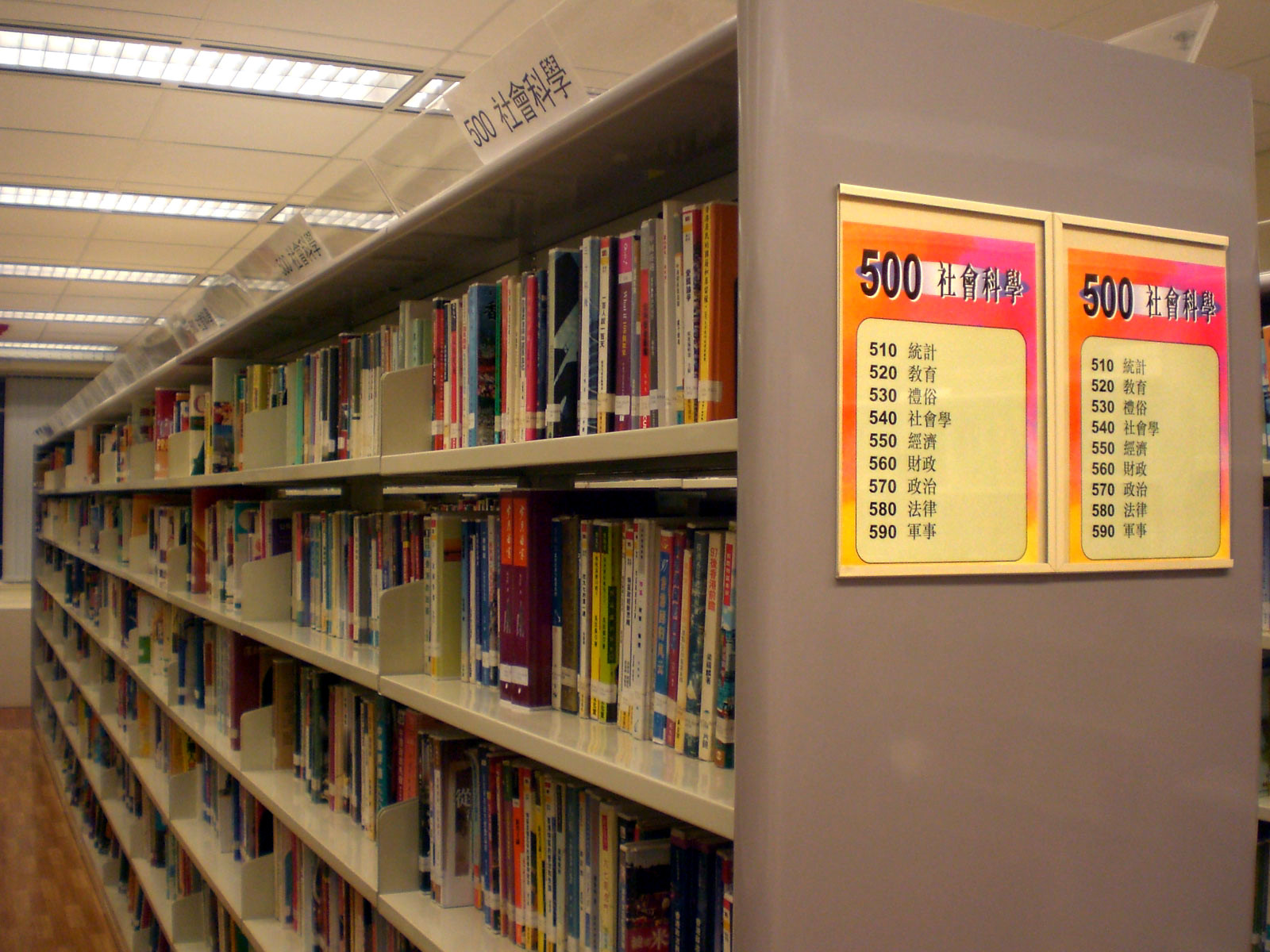
A library book shelf in Hong Kong arranged using the Dewey classification

A library classification is a system used within a library to organize materials, including books, sound and video recordings, electronic materials, etc., both on shelves and in catalogs and indexes. Each item is typically assigned a call number, which identifies the location of the item within the system. Materials can be arranged by many different factors, typically in either a hierarchical tree structure based on the subject or using a faceted classification system, which allows the assignment of multiple classifications to an object, enabling the classifications to be ordered in many ways.

== Description ==
Library classification is an important and crucial aspect in library and information science. It is distinct from scientific classification in that it has as its goal to provide a useful ordering of documents rather than a theoretical organization of knowledge. Although it has the practical purpose of creating a physical ordering of documents, it does generally attempt to adhere to accepted scientific knowledge. Library classification helps to accommodate all the newly published literature in an already created order of arrangement in a filial sequence.

Library classification can be defined as the arrangement of books on shelves, or description of them, in the manner which is most useful to those who read with the ultimate aim of grouping similar things together. Library classification is meant to achieve these four purposes: ordering the fields of knowledge in a systematic way, bring related items together in the most helpful sequence, provide orderly access on the shelf, and provide a location for an item on the shelf.

Library classification is distinct from the application of subject headings in that classification organizes knowledge into a systematic order, while subject headings provide access to intellectual materials through vocabulary terms that may or may not be organized as a knowledge system. The characteristics that a bibliographic classification demands for the sake of reaching these purposes are: a useful sequence of subjects at all levels, a concise memorable notation, and a host of techniques and devices of number synthesis.

== History ==
Library classifications were preceded by classifications used by bibliographers such as Conrad Gessner. The earliest library classification schemes organized books in broad subject categories. The earliest known library classification scheme is the Pinakes by Callimachus, a scholar at the Library of Alexandria during the third century BC. During the Renaissance and Reformation era, "Libraries were organized according to the whims or knowledge of individuals in charge." This changed the format in which various materials were classified. Some collections were classified by language and others by how they were printed.

After the printing revolution in the sixteenth century, the increase in available printed materials made such broad classification unworkable, and more granular classifications for library materials had to be developed in the nineteenth century.

In 1627 Gabriel Naudé published a book called Advice on Establishing a Library. At the time, he was working in the private library of Président à mortier Henri de Mesmes II. Mesmes had around 8,000 printed books and many more Greek, Latin and French written manuscripts. Although it was a private library, scholars with references could access it. The purpose of Advice on Establishing a Library was to identify rules for private book collectors to organize their collections in a more orderly way to increase the collection's usefulness and beauty. Naudé developed a classification system based on seven different classes: theology, medicine, jurisprudence, history, philosophy, mathematics, and the humanities. These seven classes would later be increased to twelve. Advice on Establishing a Library was about a private library, but within the same book, Naudé encouraged the idea of public libraries open to all people regardless of their ability to pay for access to the collection. One of the most famous libraries that Naudé helped improve was the Bibliothèque Mazarine in Paris. Naudé spent ten years there as a librarian. Because of Naudé's strong belief in free access to libraries to all people, the Bibliothèque Mazarine became the first public library in France around 1644.

Although libraries created order within their collections from as early as the fifth century BC, the Paris Bookseller's classification, developed in 1842 by Jacques Charles Brunet, is generally seen as the first of the modern book classifications. Brunet provided five major classes: theology, jurisprudence, sciences and arts, belles-lettres, and history. Classification can now be seen as a provider of subject access to information in a networked environment.

== Types ==
There are many standard systems of library classification in use, and many more have been proposed over the years. However, in general, classification systems can be divided into three types depending on how they are used:

Universal schemes
Covers all subjects, e.g. the Dewey Decimal Classification (DDC), Universal Decimal Classification (UDC), and Colon Classification (CC).

Specific classification schemes
Covers particular subjects or types of materials, e.g. Iconclass (art), British Catalogue of Music Classification, and Dickinson classification (music), or the NLM Classification (medicine).

National schemes
Specially created for certain countries, e.g. Swedish library classification system, SAB (Sveriges Allmänna Biblioteksförening). The Library of Congress Classification was designed around the collection of the US Library of Congress and has an American, European, and Christian bias. Nevertheless, it is used widely in large academic and research libraries.

In terms of functionality, classification systems are often described as:

Enumerative
Subject headings are listed alphabetically, with numbers assigned to each heading in alphabetical order.

Hierarchical
Subjects are divided hierarchically, from most general to most specific.

Faceted
Subjects are divided into mutually exclusive orthogonal facets.

There are few completely enumerative systems or faceted systems; most systems are a blend but favouring one type or the other. The most common classification systems, LCC and DDC, are essentially enumerative, though with some hierarchical and faceted elements (more so for DDC), especially at the broadest and most general level. The first true faceted system was the colon classification of S. R. Ranganathan.

== Methods or systems ==
Classification types denote the classification or categorization according to the form or characteristics or qualities of a classification scheme or schemes. Method and system has similar meaning. Method or methods or system means the classification schemes like Dewey Decimal Classification or Universal Decimal Classification. The types of classification is for identifying and understanding or education or research purposes while classification method means those classification schemes like DDC, UDC.

=== English language universal classification systems ===
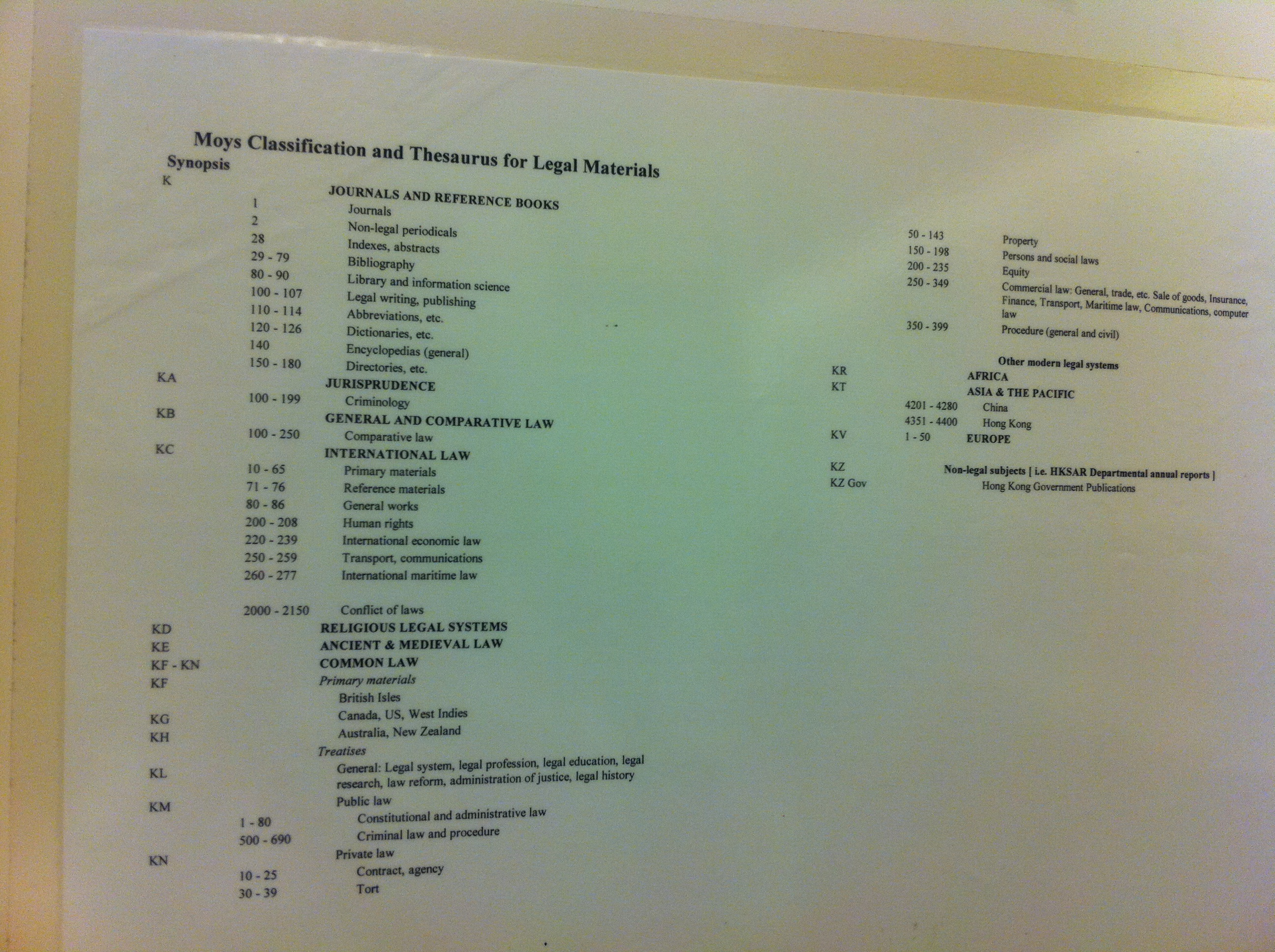
The Moys Classification Scheme as used by the law library of the Hong Kong High Court

The most common systems in English-speaking countries are:

- Dewey Decimal Classification (DDC)
- Library of Congress Classification (LCC)
- Universal Decimal Classification (UDC)

Other systems include:

- Book Industry Standards and Communications (BISAC), originally developed for use by U.S. booksellers, has become increasingly popular in libraries.
- Bliss bibliographic classification used in some British libraries
- Colon classification (CC)
- Garside classification used in most libraries of University College London
- Gladstone Library Classification, devised by W.E. Gladstone and used exclusively at Gladstone's Library
- Harvard-Yenching Classification, an English classification system for Chinese language materials

=== Non-English universal classification systems ===
- German Regensburger Verbundklassifikation (RVK)
- A system of book classification for Chinese libraries (Liu's Classification) library classification for user
  - New Classification Scheme for Chinese Libraries
- Nippon Decimal Classification (NDC)
- Chinese Library Classification (CLC)
- Korean Decimal Classification (KDC)
- Russian Library-Bibliographical Classification (BBK)
- Swedish library classification system (SAB)

=== Universal classification systems that rely on synthesis (faceted systems) ===
- Bliss bibliographic classification
- Colon classification
- Cutter Expansive Classification
- Universal Decimal Classification

Newer classification systems tend to use the principle of synthesis (combining codes from different lists to represent the different attributes of a work) heavily, which is comparatively lacking in LCC or DDC.

== Practice ==
Library classification is associated with library (descriptive) cataloging under the rubric of cataloging and classification, sometimes grouped together as technical services. The library professional who engages in the process of cataloging and classifying library materials is called a cataloger or catalog librarian. Library classification systems are one of the two tools used to facilitate subject access. The other consists of alphabetical indexing languages such as Thesauri and Subject Headings systems.

The practice of library classification is a form of the more general task of classification. The work consists of two steps. Firstly, the subject or topic of the material is ascertained. Next, a call number (essentially a book's address) based on the classification system in use at the particular library will be assigned to the work using the notation of the system.

Unlike subject heading or thesauri where multiple terms can be assigned to the same work, in library classification systems, each work can only be placed in one class. This is due to shelving purposes: A book can have only one physical place. However, in classified catalogs one may have main entries as well as added entries. Most classification systems like the Dewey Decimal Classification (DDC) and Library of Congress Classification also add a cutter number to each work which adds a code for the main entry (primary access point) of the work (e.g. author).

Classification systems in libraries generally play two roles. Firstly, they facilitate subject access by allowing the user to find out what works or documents the library has on a certain subject. Secondly, they provide a known location for the information source to be located (e.g. where it is shelved).

Until the 19th century, most libraries had closed stacks, so the library classification only served to organize the subject catalog. In the 20th century, libraries opened their stacks to the public and started to shelve library material itself according to some library classification to simplify subject browsing.

Some classification systems are more suitable for aiding subject access, rather than for shelf location. For example, Universal Decimal Classification, which uses a complicated notation of pluses and colons, is more difficult to use for the purpose of shelf arrangement but is more expressive compared to DDC in terms of showing relationships between subjects. Similarly faceted classification schemes are more difficult to use for shelf arrangement, unless the user has knowledge of the citation order.

Depending on the size of the library collection, some libraries might use classification systems solely for one purpose or the other. In extreme cases, a public library with a small collection might just use a classification system for location of resources but might not use a complicated subject classification system. Instead all resources might just be put into a couple of wide classes (travel, crime, magazines etc.). This is known as a "mark and park" classification method, more formally called "reader interest classification".

== Comparing library classification systems ==
As a result of differences in notation, history, use of enumeration, hierarchy, and facets, classification systems can differ in the following ways:

- Type of Notation: Notation can be pure (consisting of only numerals, for example) or mixed (consisting of letters and numerals, or letters, numerals, and other symbols).
- Expressiveness: This is the degree to which the notation can express relationship between concepts or structure.
- Whether they support mnemonics: For example, the number 44 in DDC notation often means it concerns some aspect of France. For example, in the Dewey classification 598.0944 concerns "Birds in France", the 09 signifies geographic division, and 44 represents France.
- Hospitality: The degree to which the system is able to accommodate new subjects.
- Brevity: The length of the notation to express the same concept.
- Speed of updates and degree of support: The better classification systems are frequently being reviewed.
- Consistency
- Simplicity
- Usability

== See also ==
- Attribute-value system
- Categorization
- Classification (general theory)
- Decimal classification
- Document classification
- Information retrieval
- Knowledge organization
- Library management
- Library of Congress Subject Headings
- W. C. Berwick Sayers
- Subject indexing
