= Bliss bibliographic classification =

Library cataloguing system

The Bliss bibliographic classification (BC) is a library classification system that was created by Henry E. Bliss (1870–1955) and published in four volumes between 1940 and 1953. Although originally devised in the United States, it was more commonly adopted by British libraries. A second edition of the system (BC2) has been in ongoing development in Britain since 1977.

== Origins ==
Henry E. Bliss began working on the Bliss Classification system while working at the City College of New York Library as Assistant Librarian. He was a critic of Melvil Dewey's work with the Dewey Decimal System and believed that organization of titles needed to be done with an intellectual mind frame. Being overly pragmatic or simply alphabetical, would be inadequate. In fact, Bliss is the only theorist who created an organizational scheme based on societal needs. Bliss wanted a classification system that would provide distinct rules yet still be adaptable to whatever kind of collection a library might have, as different libraries have different needs. His solution was the concept of "alternative location," in which a particular subject could be put in more than one place, as long as the library made a specific choice and used it consistently.

Bliss discusses his theories and basis of organization for the Bliss Classification for the first time in his 1910 article, "A Modern Classification for Libraries, with Simple Notation, Mnemonics, and Alternatives". This publication followed his 1908 reclassification of the City College collection. His work, Organization of Knowledge and the System of the Sciences was published in four volumes between 1940 and 1953.

The four broad underlying policies of the BC system are:

- alternative location
- brief, concise notation
- organizing knowledge according to academic expertise
- subjects moving gradually from topic to topic as they naturally related to one another.

Bliss deliberately avoided the use of the decimal point because of his objection to Dewey's system. Instead he used capital and lower-case letters, numerals, and every typographical symbol available on his extensive and somewhat eccentric typewriter.

Single letter codes refer to broad subject areas and further letters are added to refer to increasingly specific subdisciplines. For example, at Lancaster University:

- T Economics
- TD Business Economics
- TDG Management of Industry

== Adoption and change to second edition ==
In 1967 the Bliss Classification Association was formed. Its first publication was the Abridged Bliss Classification (ABC), intended for school libraries. In 1977 it began to publish and maintain a revised version of Bliss's system, the Bliss Bibliographic Classification (Second Edition) or BC2. This retains only the broad outlines of Bliss's scheme, replacing most of the detailed notation with a new scheme based on the principles of faceted classification. 15 of approximately 28 volumes of schedules have so far been published. A revision of this nature has been considered by some to be a completely new system.

The City College library in New York continued to use Bliss's system until 1967, when it switched to the Library of Congress system. It had become too expensive to train new staff members to use BC, and too expensive to maintain in general. Much of the Bliss stacks remain, however, as no-one has re-cataloged the books.

The case was different, however, in Britain. BC proved more popular there and also spread to other English-speaking countries. Part of the reason for its success was that libraries in teachers’ colleges liked the way Bliss had organized the subject areas on teaching and education. By the mid-1950s the system was being used in at least sixty British libraries and in a hundred by the 1970s. The Bliss Classification system has been found to be successful in academic, specialty, government, and law libraries. It has also found success in libraries outside of the United States of America, as many of these libraries do not have a history of using either the Dewey Decimal, or the Library of Congress classification system.

The general organizational pattern for classifying titles in the BC2 method are:

- Agents
- Operations
- Properties
- Materials
- Processes
- Parts
- Types
- Thing itself

== Classifications ==
The Class Schedule in BC2 is:

- 2/9 - Generalia, Phenomena, Knowledge, Information science & technology
- A/AL - Philosophy & Logic
- AM/AX - Mathematics, Probability, Statistics
- AY/B - General science, Physics
- C - Chemistry
- D - Space and Earth sciences
  - DG/DY - Earth sciences (includes Geology & Geography)
- E/GQ - Biological sciences
- GR/GZ - Applied biological sciences: agriculture and ecology
- H - Physical Anthropology, Human biology, Health sciences
- I - Psychology & Psychiatry
- J - Education
- K - Society (includes Social sciences, sociology & social anthropology)
- L/O - History (including area studies, travel and topography, and biography)
  - LA - Archaeology
- P - Religion, Occult, Morals and ethics
- Q - Social welfare & Criminology
- R - Politics & Public administration
- S - Law
- T - Economics & Management of economic enterprises
- U/V - Technology and useful arts (including household management and services)
- W - The Arts
  - WV/WX - Music
- X/Y - Language and literature
- ZA/ZW - Museology

== See also ==
- Colon classification
- Dewey Decimal Classification
- Library of Congress Classification
- Universal Decimal Classification

== Bibliography ==
- Bliss, Henry E. (1910). "A modern classification for libraries, with simple notation, mnemonics, and alternatives". Library Journal (35): 351–358.
- Bliss, Henry E. (1935). A system of bibliographic classification. New York: H. W. Wilson.
- Bliss, Henry E. (1940–1953). A bibliographic classification, extended by systematic auxiliary schedules for composite specification (4 volumes). New York: H. W. Wilson.
- Maltby, Arthur; Gill, Lindy (1979). The case for Bliss. London: Clive Bingley. ISBN 0-85157-290-1.
- Mills, Jack; Broughton, Vanda (1977–1999). Bliss bibliographic classification. 2nd ed. [BC2]. London: Butterworth.
- Thomas, Alan R (1997). "Bibliographical classification: the ideas and achievements of Henry E. Bliss". Cataloging & Classification Quarterly. 25 (1): 51–104. doi:10.1300/J104v25n01_05.
