= National Library of Medicine classification =

Medical library classification schem

The National Library of Medicine (NLM) classification system is a library indexing system covering the fields of medicine and preclinical basic sciences. Operated and maintained by the U.S. National Library of Medicine, the NLM classification is patterned after the Library of Congress (LC) Classification system: alphabetical letters denote broad subject categories which are subdivided by numbers. For example, QW 279 would indicate a book on an aspect of microbiology or immunology.

The one- or two-letter alphabetical codes in the NLM classification use a limited range of letters: only QS–QZ and W–WZ. This allows the NLM system to co-exist with the larger LC coding scheme as neither of these ranges are used in the LC system. There are, however, three pre-existing codes in the LC system which overlap with the NLM: Human Anatomy (QM), Microbiology (QR), and Medicine (R). To avoid further confusion, these three codes are not used in the NLM.

The headings for the individual schedules (letters or letter pairs) are given in brief form (e.g., QW - Microbiology and Immunology; WG - Cardiovascular System) and together they provide an outline of the subjects covered by the NLM classification. Headings are interpreted broadly and include the physiological system, the specialties connected with them, the regions of the body chiefly concerned and subordinate related fields. The NLM system is hierarchical, and within each schedule, division by organ usually has priority. Each main schedule, as well as some sub-sections, begins with a group of form numbers ranging generally from 1–49 which classify materials by publication type, e.g., dictionaries, atlases, laboratory manuals, etc.

The main schedules QS-QZ, W-WY, and WZ (excluding the range WZ 220–270) classify works published after 1913; the 19th century schedule is used for works published 1801–1913; and WZ 220-270 is used to provide century groupings for works published before 1801.

== Classification categories ==
=== Preclinical Sciences ===
- QS Human Anatomy
- QT Physiology
- QU Biochemistry
- QV Pharmacology
- QW Microbiology & Immunology
- QX Parasitology
- QY Clinical Pathology
- QZ Pathology

=== Medicine and Related Subjects ===
- W Health Professions
- WA Public Health
- WB Practice of Medicine
- WC Communicable Diseases
- WD Disorders of Systemic, Metabolic, or Environmental Origin, etc.
- WE Musculoskeletal System
- WF Respiratory System
- WG Cardiovascular System
- WH Hemic and Lymphatic Systems
- WI Digestive System
- WJ Urogenital System
- WK Endocrine System
- WL Nervous System
- WM Psychiatry
- WN Radiology. Diagnostic Imaging
- WO Surgery
- WP Gynecology
- WQ Obstetrics
- WR Dermatology
- WS Pediatrics
- WT Geriatrics. Chronic Disease
- WU Dentistry. Oral Surgery
- WV Otolaryngology
- WW Ophthalmology
- WX Hospitals & Other Health Facilities
- WY Nursing
- WZ History of Medicine
- 19th Century Schedule

== See also ==
- Dewey Decimal Classification
- Colon classification
- Library of Congress Classification
- Universal Decimal Classification
