= British Catalogue of Music Classification =

The British Catalogue of Music Classification (BCM Classification) is a faceted classification that was commissioned from E. J. Coates by the Council of the British National Bibliography to organize the content of the British Catalogue of Music. The published schedule (1960) was considerably expanded by Patrick Mills of the British Library up until its use was abandoned in 1998. Entries in the catalogue were organized by BCM classmark from the catalogue's inception in 1957 until 1982. From that year the British Catalogue of Music (which from 1974 onward was published by The British Library) was organized instead by Dewey Decimal Classification number, though BCM classmarks continued to be added to entries up to the 1998 annual cumulation.

The schedule is divided into two main parts: A–B representing Musical literature and C–Z representing Music – Scores and Parts. There are also seven auxiliary tables dealing with various sub-arrangements, sets of ethnic/locality subdivisions and chronological reference points.

The notation is retroactive using uppercase alphabetic characters omitting I and O, with the addition of slash / and parentheses ( ) which have specific anteriorizing functions. Retroactive notation requires that the classifier combines terms in reverse schedule order. This has the benefit of producing a compact notation by removing the need for facet indicators.

The schedule at A (Music Literature) parallels that from the Scores and Parts schedules thus Choral Music is at D while books about Choral Music are at AD; Harp Music is at TQ so books on harp music are at ATQ. The schedule at B accommodates books about specific composers and music in non-European traditions.

As a fully faceted scheme after the ideas of S. R. Ranganathan, BCM class numbers are capable of being chain-indexed, allowing index access to each step of the hierarchy.

BCM classification had a strong influence on the so-called Phoenix Dewey 780 schedule compiled by Russell Sweeney (1933-2020) and John Clews, which in turn influenced the 780 Music schedule in the 20th edition of Dewey Decimal Classification. The music schedule of the second edition (BC2) of the Bliss bibliographic classification is also strongly influenced by BCM classification.

This classification system is still in use at a number of libraries, including the State Library of Western Australia and the Library at Edith Cowan University.
