= New Classification Scheme for Chinese Libraries =

System of library classification

The New Classification Scheme for Chinese Libraries is a system of library classification developed by Lai Yung-hsiang since 1956. It is modified from "A System of Book Classification for Chinese Libraries" of Liu Guojun, which is based on the Dewey Decimal System.

The scheme is developed for Chinese books and commonly used in Taiwan, Hong Kong and Macau.

== Main classes ==
- 000 Generalities
- 100 Philosophy
- 200 Religion
- 300 Sciences
- 400 Applied sciences
- 500 Social sciences
- 600 History of China and Geography of China
- 700 World history and Geography
- 800 Linguistics and Literature
- 900 Arts

== Outline of the classification tables ==
- 000 Generalities
  - 000 Special collections
  - 010 Bibliography; Literacy (Documentation)
  - 020 Library and information science; Archive management
  - 030 Sinology
  - 040 General encyclopedia
  - 050 Serial publications; Periodicals
  - 060 General organization; Museology
  - 070 General collected essays
  - 080 General series
  - 090 Collected Chinese classics
- 100 Philosophy
  - 100 Philosophy: general
  - 110 Thought; Learning
  - 120 Chinese philosophy
  - 130 Oriental philosophy
  - 140 Western philosophy
  - 150 Logic
  - 160 Metaphysics
  - 170 Psychology
  - 180 Esthetics (Aesthetics)
  - 190 Ethics
- 200 Religion
  - 200 Religion: general
  - 210 Science of religion
  - 220 Buddhism
  - 230 Taoism
  - 240 Christianity
  - 250 Islam (Mohammedanism)
  - 260 Judaism
  - 270 Other religions
  - 280 Mythology
  - 290 Astrology; Superstition
- 300 Sciences
  - 300 Sciences: general
  - 310 Mathematics
  - 320 Astronomy
  - 330 Physics
  - 340 Chemistry
  - 350 Earth science; Geology
  - 360 Biological science
  - 370 Botany
  - 380 Zoology
  - 390 Anthropology
- 400 Applied sciences
  - 400 Applied sciences: general
  - 410 Medical sciences
  - 420 Home economics
  - 430 Agriculture
  - 440 Engineering
  - 450 Mining and metallurgy
  - 460 Chemical engineering
  - 470 Manufacture
  - 480 Commerce: various business
  - 490 Commerce: administration and management
- 500 Social sciences
  - 500 Social sciences: general
  - 510 Statistics
  - 520 Education
  - 530 Rite and custom
  - 540 Sociology
  - 550 Economy
  - 560 Finance
  - 570 Political science
  - 580 Law; Jurisprudence
  - 590 Military science
- 600-700 History and geography
  - 600 History and geography: General
- History and geography of China
  - 610 General history of China
  - 620 Chinese history by period
  - 630 History of Chinese civilization
  - 640 Diplomatic history of China
  - 650 Historical sources
  - 660 Geography of China
  - 670 Local history
  - 680 Topical topography
  - 690 Chinese travels
- World history and geography
  - 710 World: general history and geography
  - 720 Oceans and seas
  - 730 Asia: history and geography
  - 740 Europe: history and geography
  - 750 America: history and geography
  - 760 Africa: history and geography
  - 770 Oceania: history and geography
  - 780 Biography
  - 790 Antiquities and archaeology
- 800 Linguistics and literature
  - 800 Linguistics: general
  - 810 Literature: general
  - 820 Chinese literature
  - 830 Chinese literature: general collections
  - 840 Chinese literature: individual works
  - 850 Various Chinese literature
  - 860 Oriental literature
  - 870 Western literature
  - 880 Other countries literatures
  - 890 Journalism
- 900 Arts
  - 900 Arts: general
  - 910 Music
  - 920 Architecture
  - 930 Sculpture
  - 940 Drawing and painting; Calligraphy
  - 950 Photography; Computer art
  - 960 Decorative arts
  - 970 Arts and Crafts movement
  - 980 Theatre
  - 990 Recreation and leisure

== See also ==
=== Decimal systems ===
- Dewey Decimal Classification
- Korean decimal classification
- Nippon Decimal Classification

=== Non-decimal systems ===
- Chinese Library Classification
- Library of Congress Classification
