= Decimal system =

Decimal system may refer to:

- Decimal (base ten) number system, used in mathematics for writing numbers and performing arithmetic
- Dewey Decimal System, a subject classification system used in libraries
- Decimal currency system, where each unit of currency can be divided into 100 (or 10 or 1000) sub-units
- Decimal measurement system, see decimalization

== See also ==
- Metric system
- Decimal point
- Positional notation with decimal points
- Decimal (disambiguation)
