= W. C. Berwick Sayers =

British librarian and teacher

William Charles Berwick Sayers (1881–1960) was a British librarian and teacher. He was one of a "small but remarkable" group of librarians involved in public libraries in the early 20th century and was President of the Library Association in the United Kingdom in the year 1938.

== Early life ==
Sayers was born in Mitcham, Surrey on 23 December 1881.

== Career ==
In 1896 Sayers began as a junior assistant at the Bournemouth Public Library and in 1904 he was appointed as deputy librarian, working under principal librarian Stanley Jast, at the Public Library in Croydon which then a small country town near south London.

In 1915, he became the chief librarian of the Croydon Public Library and under his leadership he introduced a library service for children and during the 1930s he opened several branch libraries. He made every library an arts centre with a "programme of lectures, recitals and exhibitions". He also set up libraries in hospitals and schools in the country. He was successful in convincing the local council to provide a generous budget and his libraries gained an international reputation for their high standards.

After the Second World War, during which he had been badly injured while serving as a Civil Defence controller, he retired from the Croydon Public Libraries.

== Legacy ==
Sayers contributed in several areas of librarianship: he served in the Library Assistants' Association, contributed to children's librarianship, was a respected teacher and "an outstanding authority" on library classification, and served as a long-term editor of the journal Library World.

He was also a personal friend of musician Samuel Coleridge-Taylor, and after Coleridge-Taylor's untimely death in 1912, Coleridge-Taylor's widow asked Sayers to become his biographer.

== Bibliography ==
=== As author ===
- The Grammar of Classification, Croydon, Central Library, 1912.
- Samuel Coleridge-Taylor, Musician. His Life and Letters, Cassell & Co., 1916, 2nd ed. 1927.
- A Manual of Classification for Librarians & Bibliographers, London: Grafton & Co., 1926, 2nd ed. 1944.
- A Manual of Children's Libraries, Allen & Unwin, 1932.
- An Introduction to Library Classification, London, Grafton & Co., 1935.
- Library Local Collections, Allen & Unwin, 1938.
- Croydon and the Second World War - the official history of the warwork of the borough and its citizens from 1939 to 1945; together with The Croydon roll of honour. by W. C. Berwick Sayers

=== As editor ===
- James Duff Brown, Manual of Library Economy, 5th ed. Revised by W. C. Berwick Sayers. London, Grafton, 1931.
- Books for Youth: A Classified and Annotated Guide for Young Readers, London, Library Association, 1936.

=== Further reading ===
- D.J. Foskett and B.I. Palmer, eds., The Sayers Memorial Volume, London: Library Association, 1961; ISBN 9780598068927
- Munford, W. A., A History of The Library Association, 1877-1977, London: The Library Association, 1976; ISBN 9780853654889
- Ranganathan, S.R., "Sayers and Donker Duyvis: Theory and Manner of Library Classification", Annals of Library Science, 8(3) September 1961, 85-99.
