= Lars Krantz =

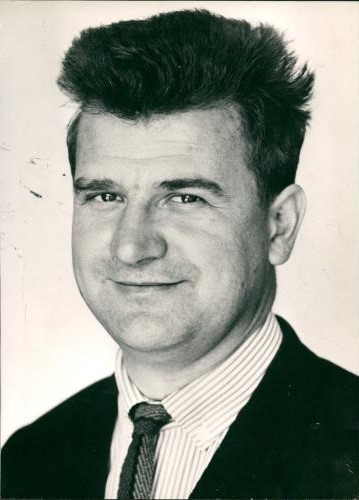
Image of Lars Krantz

Lars Krantz (May 25, 1926 – December 17, 2010) was a Swedish TV producer, author and private investigator involved in the Palme assassination. He came involved in the debate around the murder of Olof Palme by coincident, because he happened to be on a bus a few blocks from the murder scene, the same night as the murder took place, where he saw some people which he thought behaved a bit strange. From that moment he got heavily involved in the debate, a debate which also included theories that some police men might have been involved.

== Early years and media career ==
Krantz was born in Gothenburg, the son of the author and journalist Claes Krantz. In the 1950s and 60s he worked as a television producer in the 1950s and 60s, both in Stockholm and Gothenburg, with documentary works such as Vikingar i Österled and the short film Bronsålder (1952). The latter was shown at the Cannes Film Festival.

== Private investigator ==
The murder of Olof Palme, the Swedish prime minister, 28 February 1986, around 11:30 pm local time, came as a shock for Sweden and the world. Lars Krantz happened to be on board on bus no. 43 near the corner Sveavägen-Tunnelgatan, where the murder took place. For that reason he contacted the police investigation to tell them about his observations, namely about some of the passengers with a somewhat strange and suspicious behaviour. His information has since become part of the so-called Police Track, the theories that some police men might have something to do with the murder. He later started the website nationalmordet.nu, where he presented numerous conspiracy theories about the people involved.

== Bibliography ==
- Ja vi elskar: illustrerad svensk bok om Norge (in Swedish). Göteborg: Zinderman. 1970. LIBRIS: 2293149.
- Så ser vi på TV. Hur använder du TV? Hur använder TV dej?: en rapport från svenska hem (in Swedish). Stockholm: Tiden. 1974. ISBN 9155017894. LIBRIS: 7420286.
- När tyskarna flög i luften (in Swedish). Stockholm: Sveriges radio. 1977. ISBN 9152215016. LIBRIS: 7409546.
- Mordet på Olof Palme: ett verkligt drama (in Swedish). Hagfors: Krelib. 1987. ISBN 9186876031. LIBRIS: 7761026.
- Dö i rättan tid (in Swedish). Stockholm: Författares bokmaskin. 1996. ISBN 9179100171. LIBRIS: 8377330.
- Fem noveller om Palmemordet (in Swedish). Sydkoster: L. Krantz. 2000. LIBRIS: 3327001.
