= Musical composition =

Original musical piece, or the process of creating such

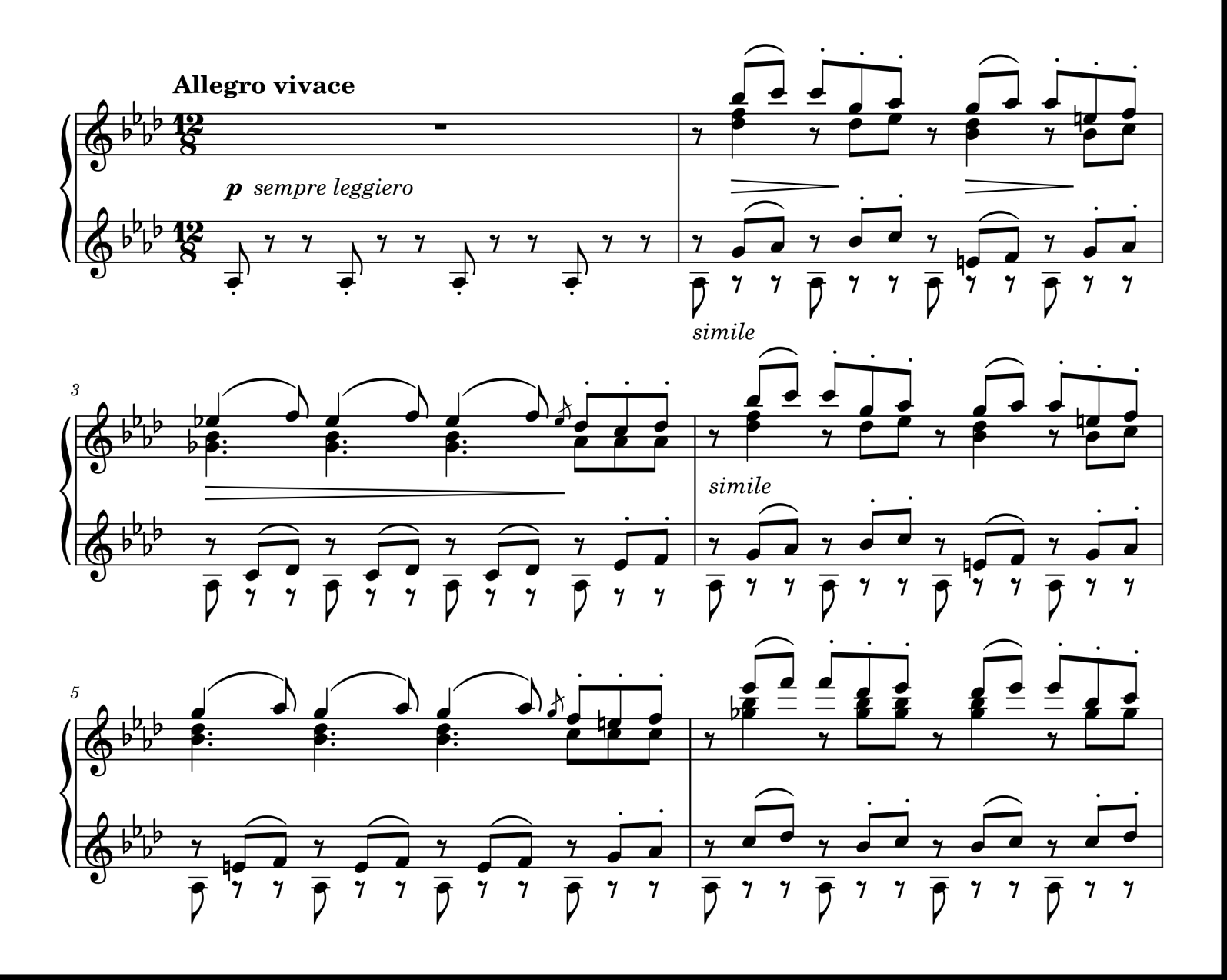
Scherzo in A flat by the Russian Romantic era composer Alexander Borodin (1833–1887)

Jazz, rock and pop songwriters typically write out newly composed songs in a lead sheet, which notates the melody, the chord progression and the tempo or style of the song (e.g., "slow blues").

Jazz and rock genre musicians may memorize the melodies for a new song, which means that they only need to provide a chord chart to guide improvising musicians.

Musical composition can refer to an original piece or work of music, either vocal or instrumental, the structure of a musical piece or to the process of creating or writing music. People who create compositions are called composers. Composers of primarily songs are usually called songwriters; with songs, the person who writes lyrics for a song is the lyricist. In classical music, orchestration (choosing the instruments of a large music ensemble such as an orchestra which will play the different parts of music, such as the melody, accompaniment, countermelody, bassline and so on) is typically done by the composer, but in musical theatre and in pop music, songwriters may hire an arranger to do the orchestration. In some cases, a pop or traditional songwriter may not use written notation at all and instead compose the song in their mind and then play, sing or record it from memory. In jazz and popular music, notable sound recordings by influential performers are given the weight that written or printed scores play in classical music.

A piece of music can also be composed with words, images or, since the 20th century, with computer programs that explain or notate how the singer or musician should create musical sounds. Examples range from 20th century avant-garde music that uses graphic notation, to text compositions such as Karlheinz Stockhausen's Aus den sieben Tagen, to computer programs that select sounds for musical pieces. Music that makes heavy use of randomness and chance is called aleatoric music and is associated with contemporary composers active in the 20th century, such as John Cage, Morton Feldman and Witold Lutosławski. A more commonly known example of chance-based, or indeterminate, music is the sound of wind chimes jingling in a breeze. The study of composition has traditionally been dominated by examination of methods and practice of Western classical music, but the definition of composition is broad enough to include the creation of popular music and traditional music songs and instrumental pieces, and to include spontaneously improvised works like those of free jazz performers and African percussionists such as Ewe drummers.

In the 2000s, composition is considered to consist of the manipulation of each aspect of music (harmony, melody, form, rhythm and timbre), according to Jean-Benjamin de Laborde (1780, 2:12):

Composition consists in two things only. The first is the ordering and disposing of several sounds...in such a manner that their succession pleases the ear. This is what the Ancients called melody. The second is the rendering audible of two or more simultaneous sounds in such a manner that their combination is pleasant. This is what we call harmony and it alone merits the name of composition.

== Terminology ==
Since the invention of sound recording, a classical piece or popular song may exist as a recording. If music is composed before being performed, music can be performed from memory (the norm for instrumental soloists in concerto performances and singers in opera shows and art song recitals), by reading written musical notation (the norm in large ensembles, such as orchestras, concert bands and choirs), or through a combination of both methods. For example, the principal cello player in an orchestra may read most of the accompaniment parts in a symphony, where she is playing tutti parts, but then memorize an exposed solo, in order to be able to watch the conductor. Compositions comprise a huge variety of musical elements, which vary widely from between genres and cultures. Popular music genres after about 1960 make extensive use of electric and electronic instruments, such as electric guitar and electric bass. Electric and electronic instruments are used in contemporary classical music compositions and concerts, albeit to a lesser degree than in popular music. Music from the Baroque music era (1600–1750), for example, used only acoustic and mechanical instruments such as strings, brass, woodwinds, timpani and keyboard instruments such as harpsichord and pipe organ. A 2000s-era pop band may use an electric guitar played with electronic effects through a guitar amplifier, a digital synthesizer keyboard and electronic drums.

=== Piece ===
Piece is a "general, non-technical term [that began to be] applied mainly to instrumental compositions from the 17th century onwards....other than when they are taken individually 'piece' and its equivalents are rarely used of movements in sonatas or symphonies....composers have used all these terms [in their different languages] frequently in compound forms [e.g. Klavierstück]....In vocal music...the term is most frequently used for operatic ensembles..."

== As a musical form ==
Composition techniques draw parallels from visual art's formal elements. Sometimes, the entire form of a piece is through-composed, meaning that each part is different, with no repetition of sections; other forms include strophic, rondo, verse-chorus, and others. Some pieces are composed around a set scale, where the compositional technique might be considered the usage of a particular scale. Others are composed during performance (see improvisation), where a variety of techniques are also sometimes used. Some are used from particular songs which are familiar.

The scale for the notes used, including the mode and tonic note, is important in tonal musical composition. Similarly, music of the Middle East employs compositions that are rigidly based on a specific mode (maqam) often within improvisational contexts, as does Indian classical music in both the Hindustani and the Carnatic system.

== Methods ==
=== Computer methods ===
As technology has developed in the 20th and 21st century, new methods of music composition have come about. EEG headsets have also been used to create music by interpreting the brainwaves of musicians. This method has been used for Project Mindtunes, which involved collaborating disabled musicians with DJ Fresh, and also by artists Lisa Park and Masaki Batoh.

== Compositional instrumentation ==
The task of adapting a composition for different musical ensembles is called arranging or orchestration, may be undertaken by the composer or separately by an arranger based on the composer's core composition. Based on such factors, composers, orchestrators, and arrangers must decide upon the instrumentation of the original work. In the 2020s, the contemporary composer can virtually write for almost any combination of instruments, ranging from a string section, wind and brass sections used in a standard orchestras to electronic instruments such as synthesizers. Some common group settings include music for full orchestra (consisting of strings, woodwinds, brass, and percussion), concert band (which consists of larger sections and greater diversity of woodwind, brass, and percussion instruments than are usually found in the orchestra), or a chamber group (a small number of instruments, but at least two). The composer may also choose to write for only one instrument, in which case this is called a solo. Solos may be unaccompanied, as with works for solo piano or solo cello, or solos may be accompanied by another instrument or by an ensemble.

Composers are not limited to writing only for instruments, they may also decide to write for voice (including choral works, some symphonies, operas, and musicals). Composers can also write for percussion instruments or electronic instruments. Alternatively, as is the case with musique concrète, the composer can work with many sounds often not associated with the creation of music, such as typewriters, sirens, and so forth. In Elizabeth Swados' Listening Out Loud, she explains how a composer must know the full capabilities of each instrument and how they must complement each other, not compete. She gives an example of how in an earlier composition of hers, she had the tuba playing with the piccolo. This would clearly drown the piccolo out. Each instrument chosen to be in a piece must have a reason for being there that adds to what the composer is trying to convey within the work.

== Arranging ==
Arranging is composition which employs prior material so as to comment upon it such as in mash-ups and various contemporary classical works.

== Interpretation ==
Even when music is notated relatively precisely, as in Western classical music from the 1750s onwards, there are many decisions that a performer or conductor has to make, because notation does not specify all of the elements of musical performance. The process of deciding how to perform music that has been previously composed and notated is termed "interpretation". Different performers' or conductor's interpretations of the same work of music can vary widely, in terms of the tempos that are chosen and the playing or singing style or phrasing of the melodies. Composers and songwriters who present their own music in a concert are interpreting their songs, just as much as those who perform the music of others. The standard body of choices and techniques present at a given time and a given place is referred to as performance practice, whereas interpretation is generally used to mean the individual choices of a performer.

== Copyright and legal status ==
Copyright is a government-granted monopoly which, for a limited time, gives a composition's owner—such as a composer or a composer's employer, in the case of work for hire—a set of exclusive rights to the composition, such as the exclusive right to publish sheet music describing the composition and how it should be performed. Copyright requires anyone else wanting to use the composition in the same ways to obtain a license (permission) from the owner. In some jurisdictions, the composer can assign copyright, in part, to another party. Often, composers who are not doing business as publishing companies themselves will temporarily assign their copyright interests to formal publishing companies, granting those companies a license to control both the publication and the further licensing of the composer's work. Contract law, not copyright law, governs these composer–publisher contracts, which ordinarily involve an agreement on how profits from the publisher's activities related to the work will be shared with the composer in the form of royalties.

The scope of copyright in general is defined by various international treaties and their implementations, which take the form of national statutes, and in common law jurisdictions, case law. These agreements and corresponding body of law distinguish between the rights applicable to sound recordings and the rights applicable to compositions. For example, Beethoven's 9th Symphony is in the public domain, but in most of the world, recordings of particular performances of that composition usually are not. For copyright purposes, song lyrics and other performed words are considered part of the composition, even though they may have different authors and copyright owners than the non-lyrical elements. Many jurisdictions allow for compulsory licensing of certain uses of compositions. For example, copyright law may allow a record company to pay a modest fee to a copyright collective to which the composer or publisher belongs, in exchange for the right to make and distribute CDs containing a cover band's performance of the composer or publisher's compositions. The license is "compulsory" because the copyright owner cannot refuse or set terms for the license. Copyright collectives also typically manage the licensing of public performances of compositions, whether by live musicians or by transmitting sound recordings over radio or the Internet.

=== In the U.S. ===
Even though the first US copyright laws did not include musical compositions, they were added as part of the Copyright Act of 1831. According to a circular issued by the United States Copyright Office on Copyright Registration of Musical Compositions and Sound Recordings, a musical composition is defined as "A musical composition consists of music, including any accompanying words, and is normally registered as a work of the performing arts. The author of a musical composition is generally the composer, and the lyricists if any. A musical composition may be in the form of a notated copy (for example sheet music) or in the form of a phonorecord (for example cassette tape, LP, or CD). Sending a musical composition in the form of a phonorecord does not necessarily mean that there is a claim to copyright in the sound recording."

=== In the UK ===
Copyright, Designs and Patents Act 1988 defines a musical work to mean "a work consisting of music, exclusive of any words or action intended to be sung, spoken or performed with the music."

=== In India ===
In India The Copy Right Act, 1957 prevailed for original literary, dramatic, musical and artistic work until the Copyright (Amendment) Act, 1984 was introduced. Under the amended act, a new definition has been provided for musical work which states "musical works means a work consisting of music and included any graphical notation of such work but does not included any words or any action intended to be sung, spoken or performed with the music."

There are several platforms offering music composition services online.

== See also ==
- BCM Classification
- Developing variation
- Dickinson classification
- MIDI composition
- Music manuscript
- Music publisher (popular music)
- Répertoire International des Sources Musicales (RISM)

== Sources ==
- Laborde, Jean-Benjamin de. 1780. Essai sur la musique Ancienne et moderne, 4 vols. Paris: Ph.D. Pierres & Eugène Onfroy.
