= Jonas Hinnfors =

Swedish political science professor

Ivar Per Jonas Hinnfors (born 27 June 1956 in Ystad), is a Swedish professor of political science. He received his doctorate in 1992 at the University of Gothenburg, where he became a professor of political science in 2007.

== Bibliography ==
- Hinnfors, Jonas (1995). På dagordningen?: svensk politisk stil i förändring (in Swedish). Stockholm: Nerenius & Santérus. ISBN 91-88384-60-8. LIBRIS: 7771470.
- EMU-utredningen; Hinnfors Jonas, Pierre Jon (1996). Sverige och EMU: betänkande. Bil. 18, Autonomi, suveränitet och ekonomisk politik : EMU-medlemskapets inverkan på svenskt politiskt beslutsfattande (in Swedish). Stockholm: Fritze. ISBN 91-38-20455-X. LIBRIS: 7266081.
- Ulf Bjereld; Marie Demker, Jonas Hinnfors (1999). Varför vetenskap?: om vikten av problem och teori i forskningsprocessen. Göteborg studies in politics, 0346-5942 ; 62 (in Swedish). Lund: Studentlitteratur. ISBN 91-44-00730-2. LIBRIS: 7274853.
- Hinnfors, Jonas (2006). Reinterpreting social democracy: a history of stability in the British Labour Party and Swedish Social Democratic Party. Critical labour movement studies. Manchester: Manchester University Press. ISBN 0-7190-7362-6. LIBRIS: 10080682.
- Korkut Umut, ed. (2013). The discourses and politics of migration in Europe. Europe in transition: The NYU european studies series. New York: Palgrave Macmillan. ISBN 9781137310897. LIBRIS: 14681152.

== External ==
- Official website
