= Decimal classification =

Decimal classification is a type of library classification. Examples include:

- Dewey Decimal Classification (DDC)
- Korean Decimal Classification (KDC)
- Nippon Decimal Classification (NDC)
- Universal Decimal Classification (UDC)

== See also ==
- Classification
- Decimal
- Decimal section numbering
