= Document classification =

Process of categorizing documents

Document classification or document categorization is a problem in library science, information science and computer science. The task is to assign a document to one or more classes or categories. This may be done "manually" (or "intellectually") or algorithmically. The intellectual classification of documents has mostly been the province of library science, while the algorithmic classification of documents is mainly in information science and computer science. The problems are overlapping, however, and there is therefore interdisciplinary research on document classification.

The documents to be classified may be texts, images, music, etc. Each kind of document possesses its special classification problems. When not otherwise specified, text classification is implied.

Documents may be classified according to their subjects or according to other attributes (such as document type, author, printing year etc.). In the rest of this article only subject classification is considered. There are two main philosophies of subject classification of documents: the content-based approach and the request-based approach.

== "Content-based" versus "request-based" classification ==
Content-based classification is classification in which the weight given to particular subjects in a document determines the class to which the document is assigned. It is, for example, a common rule for classification in libraries, that at least 20% of the content of a book should be about the class to which the book is assigned. In automatic classification it could be the number of times given words appears in a document.

Request-oriented classification (or -indexing) is classification in which the anticipated request from users is influencing how documents are being classified. The classifier asks themself: “Under which descriptors should this entity be found?” and “think of all the possible queries and decide for which ones the entity at hand is relevant” (Soergel, 1985, p. 230).

Request-oriented classification may be classification that is targeted towards a particular audience or user group. For example, a library or a database for feminist studies may classify/index documents differently when compared to a historical library. It is probably better, however, to understand request-oriented classification as policy-based classification: The classification is done according to some ideals and reflects the purpose of the library or database doing the classification. In this way it is not necessarily a kind of classification or indexing based on user studies. Only if empirical data about use or users are applied should request-oriented classification be regarded as a user-based approach.

== Classification versus indexing ==
Sometimes a distinction is made between assigning documents to classes ("classification") versus assigning subjects to documents ("subject indexing") but as Frederick Wilfrid Lancaster has argued, this distinction is not fruitful. "These terminological distinctions,” he writes, “are quite meaningless and only serve to cause confusion” (Lancaster, 2003, p. 21). The view that this distinction is purely superficial is also supported by the fact that a classification system may be transformed into a thesaurus and vice versa (cf., Aitchison, 1986, 2004; Broughton, 2008; Riesthuis & Bliedung, 1991). Therefore, assigning a subject term to a document in an index is equivalent to assigning that document to the class of documents indexed by that term (all documents indexed or classified as X belong to the same class of documents).

== Automatic document classification (ADC) ==
Automatic document classification tasks can be divided into three sorts: supervised document classification where some external mechanism (such as human feedback) provides information on the correct classification for documents, unsupervised document classification (also known as document clustering), where the classification must be done entirely without reference to external information, and semi-supervised document classification, where parts of the documents are labeled by the external mechanism. There are several software products under various license models available.

=== Techniques ===
Automatic document classification techniques include:

- Artificial neural network
- Concept Mining
- Decision trees such as ID3 or C4.5
- Expectation maximization (EM)
- Instantaneously trained neural networks
- Latent semantic indexing
- Multiple-instance learning
- Naive Bayes classifier
- Natural language processing approaches
- Rough set-based classifier
- Soft set-based classifier
- Support vector machines (SVM)
- K-nearest neighbour algorithms
- tf–idf

== Applications ==
Classification techniques have been applied to

- spam filtering, a process which tries to discern E-mail spam messages from legitimate emails
- email routing, sending an email sent to a general address to a specific address or mailbox depending on topic
- language identification, automatically determining the language of a text
- genre classification, automatically determining the genre of a text
- readability assessment, automatically determining the degree of readability of a text, either to find suitable materials for different age groups or reader types or as part of a larger text simplification system
- sentiment analysis, determining the attitude of a speaker or a writer with respect to some topic or the overall contextual polarity of a document.
- health-related classification using social media in public health surveillance
- article triage, selecting articles that are relevant for manual literature curation, for example as is being done as the first step to generate manually curated annotation databases in biology

== See also ==
- Classification
- Compound-term processing
- Concept-based image indexing
- Document
- Document retrieval
- Information retrieval
- Knowledge organization
- Knowledge organization system
- Library classification
- Subject (documents)
- Subject indexing
