= Swedish library classification system =

Library system used in Sweden

The Swedish library classification system, (Swedish: Klassifikationssystem för svenska bibliotek), or SAB system (SAB-systemet) is a library classification system for use in many public, school, and research libraries in Sweden. It primarily classifies books but is also used for other media, such as audio and video recordings. The first edition of the system was released in 1921 and was based on the classification that was used in the accession catalogs of the scientific libraries of that time. The abbreviation 'SAB' is for "Sveriges Allmänna Biblioteksförening" (Sweden's public library association). SAB merged with Svenska bibliotekariesamfundet (Swedish librarians' association) to form present day Svensk Biblioteksförening (Swedish library association).

The SAB system is regularly revised to track developments in new subject areas. The committee for classification systems for Swedish libraries—a part of Svensk Biblioteksförening—promulgates changes, corrections, and usage notes. Larger revisions may cause changes to the whole system and a new version of the classification system is published. The latest, eighth revision was started in 2002 and was put in use in autumn 2006.

Both the research libraries (via the National Library of Sweden) and the public libraries decided at the end of 2008 to recommend a transition to the Dewey Decimal system. The research libraries' major reason for transitioning are simplification: large parts of research literature is already classified in this system. For public libraries the concern is to have the same classification system over the entire country. A considerable savings would be enjoyed by both parties by not having to maintain a distinct national classification system.

== Structure ==
SAB is built in a tree structure, where each individual subject has a signum. A signum is a code of one or more letters and sometimes other symbols, which together represent a particular subject category. The first letter, in upper case, indicates a general subject area (e.g. C for religion). Additional lower case letters after the initial letter indicate more specialized subjects (e.g. Cg for practical theology and Cge for catechesis). There is in principle no limit to how many subcategories can be formed in this way.

== Additional notation ==
A signum can be made more precise with additional notation. The following additional notations exist:

- Geographic division (expressed with a hyphen)
  Ab Libraries, Ab-c Libraries : Sweden or Qaea-j Monetary systems : France
- Chronological division (expressed with a period)
  Kc.3 Swedish history : Middle ages
- Language specification (expressed with an equal sign)
  Kj=e History of France: in English
- Aspect (expressed with a colon)
  F:do Language : psychology or Pcj:k Telephony : history
- Biography (expressed with 'z' and the name of the subject of the biography)
  Dcz Chomsky, Noam Logic and language-oriented philosophy : biographies of Noam Chomsky
- Type of work (expressed with parentheses)
  Ke(u) English history : primary source or Vpg(p) Nursing : periodical
- Target audience (expressed with a comma or as a prefix to the signature stem)
  Ih,u or uIh Arts and crafts : for children or young adults
- Medium (expressed with a solidus)
  Cba/LG Old testament : recording, gramophone record

In addition special additional codes are available which are only used on particular signums. These always begin with .0. For instance, the category Fc (the Swedish language) can be subdivided

- Fc.00 History of the Swedish language
- Fc.01 Swedish grammar
- Fc.011 Swedish phonetics
- Fc.02 Swedish vocabulary

etc.

Additional notation may be combined. Thus, Ab-c:b(p) for Libraries : Sweden : research : periodicals.

== SAB main classes ==
The main classes of SAB are

- A - Books and libraries
- B - General interest
- C - Religion
- D - Philosophy and psychology
- E - Parenting and education
- F - Philology and linguistics
- G - Literary science
- H - Fiction
- I - Art, music, theatre, film, photography
- J - Archaeology
- K - History
- L - Biography with genealogy
- M - Ethnography, social anthropology, and ethnology
- N - Geography
- O - Social science and jurisprudence
- P - Technology, industry, and communication
- Q - Economics and business
- R - Sport, play, and games
- S - Military subjects
- T - Mathematics
- U - Natural science
- V - Medicine
- X - Musical works, such as sheet music, piano rolls
- Y - Music recordings
- Ä - Newspapers

== See also ==
- LIBRIS, the Library Information System of Sweden
