= Subject access =

Subject access refers to the methods and systems by which books, journals, and other documents are accessed in a given bibliographic database (e.g. a library classification system). The single records in a bibliographic file are structured in fields and each field can be searchable and combined with other fields. Such searchable data from fields of records are termed access points. Some of these access points contain information such as author name, number of pages, the language of publication, name of publisher, etc. These are in library jargon termed "descriptive data". Other kinds of access points contain information such as title words, classification codes, indexing terms, etc. They are termed subject access points.

However, a subject access point is defined as any access point useful for subject searching. There is no precise border between descriptive access points and subject access points. In theory, any access point may hypothetically be used for subject searching.

== See also ==
- Metadata
- Subject (documents)
