= Decimal (disambiguation) =

Decimal could mean:

- A decimal or base ten numeral system
- Decimal (unit), an obsolete unit of measure in India and Bangladesh
- Decimal data type, a data type used to represent non-repeating decimal fractions
- Decimal fraction, a fraction whose denominator is a power of ten
- Decimal representation, a mathematical expression for a number written as a series
- Decimal separator, used to mark the boundary between the ones and tenths place in numbers (e.g. "12.4"), often referred to as a "decimal"
- "Decimal", a 2013 track by Orchestral Manoeuvres in the Dark from the album English Electric
- Decimal (typeface) a font designed by Hoefler & Co. inspired by the markings on watch dials.

== See also ==
- Decimal classification
- Decimal section numbering
