= Korean Decimal Classification =

Library classification system

The Korean Decimal Classification (KDC) is a system of library classification used in South Korea. The structure and main level classes of the KDC are based on the Dewey Decimal Classification. The KDC is maintained and published by the Classification Committee of the Korean Library Association. The first edition of the classification was published in 1964; the most recent edition is the sixth edition published in 2013. Almost all school and public libraries in South Korea use the KDC to organize their collections, as well as the National Library of Korea and some university libraries.

== History ==
Multiple library classification systems had been developed for Korean libraries before the publication of the KDC. These included the Railway Bureau Library Classification(1920), the Korean Decimal Classification edited by Bong-Suk Park(known as KDCP, 1947), the Han-Un Decimal Classification(1954), and the Kuk-Yeon Decimal Classification(1958). After the disappearance of editor Bong-Suk Park in the 1950s, the KDCP system decreased in use. Korean librarians considered adopting the Dewey Decimal Classification (DDC), especially after it was implemented at Yonsei University in 1957, but struggled to apply it to East Asian and Korean-focused works in their collections.

In February 1963, members of the Korean Library Association's Classification were appointed to create a national classification; they decided to make revisions to the order of the main classes of the DDC, for example bringing together the class Language(700) together with the class for Literature(800).

Committee members prepared draft classes and indexes and the first edition of the KDC was published in May 1964. Both the text and the index were written in Korean Hangul characters and Chinese characters.

The second edition was published just two years later, in 1966, correcting errors and omissions found in the first edition.

The third edition was published in 1980, maintaining the basic framework of the previous editions while expanding significantly.

The fourth edition, published in 1996, made considerable changes, including increasing the number of representatives on the Classification Committee. The committee sought feedback from the library community and implemented revisions included in the recently published edition 20 of the DDC and edition 9 of the Nippon Decimal Classification. New policies applied to the fourth edition included principles suggesting the main classes should remain as static as possible, with focus shown to expanding classes devoted to technology and science. Likewise, many subject specialists were consulted for the publication of the fifth edition in 2009. The publication of the 23rd edition of the DDC in 2011 provided opportunity for a new revision of the KDC, and the sixth edition was published in July 2013. Greater numbers of classes provided number building capacity in the sixth edition, allowing for more specificity.

Edition	Publication year	Number of volumes	Configure	Number of pages	Editor
1st	1964	1	schedule (Including relative index)	642	Hye-Bong Chun
2nd	1966	1	schedule (Including relative index)	686	Hye-Bong Chun
3rd	1980	2	schedule, relative index	1,027	Byung-Su Lee
4th	1996	2	schedule, relative index	1,516	Ki-Won Kwon
5th	2009	2	schedule, relative index	1,529	Tae-Woo Nam
6th	2013	3	schedule, relative index, manual	1,719	Dong-Geun Oh

== Description ==
The KDC classifies resources primarily by discipline, though some classes are collocated by subject. There are eight auxiliary mnemonic tables used to expand class numbers.

The main classes of the KDC are the same as the main classes of the Dewey Decimal Classification, but four of those main classes are in a different order: Natural sciences (400), Technology and engineering (500), Arts (600), and Language 700. Though the structure is heavily influenced by the DDC, aspects of multiple library classifications have been invoked in the creation of the KDC, including the Library of Congress Classification for the arrangement of the social sciences (300), the Universal Decimal Classification for medical sciences (510), the KDCP for Korean and Oriental subjects, the Nippon Decimal Classification for those of Japan and Oriental subjects.

=== Classes of the KDC 6th edition ===
- 000 General works
  - 000 General works
  - 010 Books, Bibliography
  - 020 Library & information science
  - 030 General encyclopedias
  - 040 General collected essays
  - 050 General serial publications
  - 060 General societies
  - 070 Newspapers, journalism
  - 080 General collected works
  - 090 Materials of province
- 100 Philosophy
  - 100 Philosophy
  - 110 Metaphysics
  - 120 Epistemology, etc.
  - 130 Systems of philosophy
  - 140 Chinese classics
  - 150 Oriental philosophy and thought
  - 160 Western philosophy
  - 170 Logic
  - 180 Psychology
  - 190 Ethics, moral philosophy
- 200 Religion
  - 200 Religion
  - 210 Comparative religion
  - 220 Buddhism
  - 230 Christian religion
  - 240 Taoism
  - 250 Chondoism
  - 260 [Unassigned]
  - 270 Hinduism, Brahmanism
  - 280 Islam, Mohammedianism
  - 290 Other religions
- 300 Social sciences
  - 300 Social sciences
  - 310 Statistics
  - 320 Economics
  - 330 Sociology and social problems
  - 340 Political sciences
  - 350 Public administration
  - 360 Law
  - 370 Education
  - 380 Customs, Etiquette, Folklore
  - 390 Military science
- 400 Natural sciences
  - 400 Natural sciences
  - 410 Mathematics
  - 420 Physics
  - 430 Chemistry
  - 440 Astronomy
  - 450 Earth science
  - 460 Mineralogy
  - 470 Life science
  - 480 Botany
  - 490 Zoological science
- 500 Technology
  - 500 Technology
  - 510 Medical science
  - 520 Agriculture
  - 530 Engineering, technology, etc.
  - 540 Construction and architecture
  - 550 Mechanical engineering
  - 560 Electrical, comm. & electric engineering
  - 570 Chemical engineering
  - 580 Manufactures
  - 590 Human ecology
- 600 Arts
  - 600 Arts
  - 610 [Unassigned]
  - 620 Sculpture, plastic art
  - 630 Crafts
  - 640 Calligraphy
  - 650 Painting, design
  - 660 Photography
  - 670 Music
  - 680 Stage performance, museum arts
  - 690 Amusements, sports & physical training
- 700 Language
  - 700 Language
  - 710 Korean language
  - 720 Chinese language
  - 730 Japanese & other Asian languages
  - 740 English
  - 750 German
  - 760 French languages
  - 770 Spanish languages & Portuguese language
  - 780 Italian languages
  - 790 Other languages
- 800 Literature
  - 800 Literature
  - 810 Korean literature
  - 820 Chinese literature
  - 830 Japanese & other Asian literature
  - 840 English & American literature
  - 850 German literature
  - 860 French literature
  - 870 Spanish & Portuguese literature
  - 880 Italian literature
  - 890 Other literatures
- 900 History
  - 900 History
  - 910 Asia
  - 920 Europe
  - 930 Africa
  - 940 North America
  - 950 South America
  - 960 Oceania and Polar regions
  - 970 [Unassigned]
  - 980 Geography
  - 990 Biography

=== Expansion tables ===
- Table 1. Standard subdivisions
- Table 2. Geographic Areas
- Table 3. Korean geographic areas
- Table 4. Korean historical period
- Table 5. Languages
- Table 6. Subdivisions of individual languages
- Table 7. Subdivisions of individual literatures
- Table 8. Subdivisions of individual religions

== Usage ==
KDC is used by a wide range of libraries within Korea, including by the National Library of Korea and most school and public libraries in the country, along with some university libraries, such as the one at Keimyung University.
