= Nippon Decimal Classification =

System of library classification used in Japan

The Nippon Decimal Classification (Japanese: 日本十進分類法, Hepburn: Nihonjisshinbunruihō) (NDC, also called the Nippon Decimal System) is a system of library classification developed for mainly Japanese-language books maintained and revised by the Japan Library Association since 1948. Originally developed in 1929 by Kiyoshi Mori, the 10th and latest edition of this system was published in 2014. The decimal notation system is similar to the Dewey Decimal System, and the order of main classes is inspired from the Cutter Expansive Classification. The system is based upon using a three digit number to classify subjects, where more digits can be added if necessary and a decimal point is used to separate the third and fourth digit. The first division level is called a class, the second level is called a division, and the third level is called a section. Each '1-9' digit is used to represent a specific category, with the digit '0' being used to represent general works.

== Classes ==
=== 000 ===
The General category contains books that contain general information, rather than information about specific topics. The sub-categories of the General category are:

- 010 Libraries, Library & information science
- 020 Books, Bibliography
- 030 Encyclopaedias
- 040 General collected essays
- 050 General serial publications
- 060 General societies
- 070 Journalism, Newspapers
- 080 General collections
- 090 Rare books, Local collections, Special collections

=== 100 ===
The Philosophy category contains books that contain information regarding philosophy, religion, and psychology. The sub-categories of the Philosophy category are:

- 110 Special treatises on philosophy
- 120 Oriental philosophy
- 130 Western philosophy
- 140 Psychology
- 150 Ethics & morals
- 160 Religion
- 170 Shinto
- 180 Buddhism
- 190 Christianity

=== 200 ===
The History category contains books that contain information regarding local and foreign history. The sub-categories of the History category are:

- 210 History of Japan
- 220 History of Asia
- 230 History of Europe
- 240 History of Africa
- 250 History of North America
- 260 History of South America
- 270 History of Oceania & Polar region
- 280 Biography
- 290 Geography, Topography, Travel

=== 300 ===
The Social Sciences category contains books that contain information regarding modern day society, such as government systems and cultural traditions. The sub-categories of the Social Sciences category are:

- 310 Politics
- 320 Law
- 330 Economics
- 340 Finance
- 350 Statistics
- 360 Sociology
- 370 Education
- 380 Customs, Folklore, Ethnology
- 390 National defence, Military science

=== 400 ===
The Natural Sciences category contains books that contain information regarding the natural world, such as plants, animals, and natural laws, such as math and physics. The sub-categories of the Natural Sciences category are:

- 410 Mathematics
- 420 Physics
- 430 Chemistry
- 440 Astronomy, Space science
- 450 Earth science
- 460 Biology
- 470 Botany
- 480 Zoology
- 490 Medicine, Pharmacology

=== 500 ===
The Technology & Engineering category contains books that contain information regarding man-made scientific achievements. The sub-categories of the Technology & Engineering category are:

- 510 Construction, Civil engineering
- 520 Architecture
- 530 Mechanical engineering, Nuclear engineering
- 540 Electrical & Electronic engineering
- 550 Maritime & Naval engineering
- 560 Metal & Mining engineering
- 570 Chemical technology
- 580 Manufacturing
- 590 Domestic arts and sciences

=== 600 ===
The Industry and Commerce category contains books that contain information regarding business, products, transportation systems, and money. The sub-categories of the Industry and Commerce category are:

- 610 Agriculture
- 620 Horticulture
- 630 Silk industry
- 640 Animal husbandry
- 650 Forestry
- 660 Fishing
- 670 Commerce
- 680 Transportation & Traffic
- 690 Communications

=== 700 ===
The Arts category contains books that contain information regarding various art forms, such as paintings, writing, and music. The sub-categories of the Arts category are:

- 710 Plastic arts (sculpture)
- 720 Painting & Calligraphy
- 730 Engraving
- 740 Photography & Printing
- 750 Craft
- 760 Music & Dance
- 770 Theatre, Motion Pictures
- 780 Sports, Physical Education
- 790 Recreation, Amusements

=== 800 ===
The Language category contains books that contain information regarding various languages spoken around the world. The sub-categories of the Language category are:

- 810 Japanese
- 820 Chinese
- 830 English
- 840 German
- 850 French
- 860 Spanish
- 870 Italian
- 880 Russian
- 890 Other languages

=== 900 ===
The Literature category contains books with fictional content, such as romance novels and adventure stories. The sub-categories of the Literature category are:

- 910 Japanese literature
- 920 Chinese literature
- 930 English & American literature
- 940 German literature
- 950 French literature
- 960 Spanish literature
- 970 Italian literature
- 980 Russian & Soviet literature
- 990 Other language literature
