= Faceted classification =

Method of systematically organizing knowledge

A faceted classification is a classification scheme used in organizing knowledge into a systematic order. A faceted classification uses semantic categories, either general or subject-specific, that are combined to create the full classification entry. Many library classification systems use a combination of a fixed, enumerative taxonomy of concepts with subordinate facets that further refine the topic.

== Definition ==
There are two primary types of classification used for information organization: enumerative and faceted. An enumerative classification contains a full set of entries for all concepts. A faceted classification system uses a set of semantically cohesive categories that are combined as needed to create an expression of a concept. In this way, the faceted classification is not limited to already defined concepts. While this makes the classification quite flexible, it also makes the resulting expression of topics complex. To the extent possible, facets represent "clearly defined, mutually exclusive, and collectively exhaustive aspects of a subject. The premise is that any subject or class can be analyzed into its component parts (i.e., its aspects, properties, or characteristics)." Some commonly used general-purpose facets are time, place, and form.

There are few purely faceted classifications; the best known of these is the Colon Classification of Shiyali Ramamrita Ranganathan, a general knowledge classification for libraries. Some other faceted classifications are specific to special topics, such as the Art and Architecture Thesaurus and the faceted classification of occupational safety and health topics created by D. J. Foskett for the International Labour Organization.

Many library classifications combine the enumerative and faceted classification techniques. The Dewey Decimal Classification, the Library of Congress Classification, and the Universal Decimal Classification all make use of facets at various points in their enumerated classification schedules. The allowed facets vary based on the subject area of the classification. These facets are recorded as tables that represent recurring types of subdivisions within subject areas. There are general facets that can be used wherever appropriate, such as geographic subdivisions of the topic. Other tables are applied only to specific areas of the schedules. Facets can be combined to create a complex subject statement.

Daniel Joudrey and Arlene Taylor describe faceted classification using an analogy: "If one thinks of each of the faces of a cut and polished diamond as a facet of the whole, one can picture a classification notation that has small notations standing for subparts of the whole topic, which are pieced together to create a complete classification notation."

Faceted classifications exhibit many of the same problems as classifications based on a hierarchy. In particular, some concepts could belong in more than one facet, so their placement in the classification may appear to be arbitrary to the classifier. It also tends to result in a complex notation because each facet must be distinguishable as recorded.

== Retrieval ==
Search in systems with faceted classification can enable a user to navigate information along multiple paths corresponding to different orderings of the facets. This contrasts with traditional taxonomies in which the hierarchy of categories is fixed and unchanging. It is also possible to use facets to filter search results to more quickly find desired results.

== Examples of faceted classifications ==
=== Colon classification for library materials ===
The Colon Classification developed by S. R. Ranganathan is an example of general faceted classification designed to be applied to all library materials. In the Colon Classification system, a book is assigned a set of values from each independent facet. This facet formula uses punctuation marks and symbols placed between the facets to connect them. Colon classification was named after its use of the colon as the primary symbol in its notation.

Ranganathan stated that hierarchical classification schemes like the Dewey Decimal Classification (DDC) or the Library of Congress Subject Headings are too limiting and finite to use for modern classification and that many items can pertain information to more than one subject. He organized his classification scheme into 42 classes. Each class can be categorized according to particular characteristics, that he called facets. Ranganathan said that there are five fundamental categories that can be used to demonstrate the facets of a subject: personality, material, energy, space and time. He called this the PMEST formula:

- Personality is the most specific or focal subject.
- Matter is the substance, properties or materials of the subject.
- Energy includes the processes, operations and activities.
- Space relates to the geographic location of the subject.
- Time refers to the dates or seasons of the subject.

=== Universal Decimal Classification ===
Another example of a faceted classification scheme is the Universal Decimal Classification (UDC), a complex multilingual classification that can be used in all fields of knowledge. The Universal Decimal Classification scheme was created at the end of the nineteenth century by Belgian bibliographers Paul Otlet and Henri la Fontaine. The goal of their system was to create an index that would be able to record knowledge even if it is stored in non-conventional ways including materials in notebooks and ephemera. They also wanted their index to organize material systematically instead of alphabetically.

The UDC has an overall taxonomy of knowledge that is extended with a number of facets, such as language, form, place and time. Each facet has its own symbol in the notation, such as: "=" for language; "-02" for materials, "[...]" for subordinate concepts.

=== Faceted Classification for Occupational Safety and Health ===
D. J. Foskett, a member of the Classification Research Group in London, developed classification of occupational safety and health materials for the library of the International Labour Organization. After a study of the literature in the field, he created the classification with the following facets:

- Facet A: Occupational Safety and Health: General
- Facet B: Special Classes of Workers, Industries
- Facet C: Sources of Hazards: Fire, Machinery, etc.
- Facet D: Industrial Accidents and Diseases
- Facet E: Preventive Measures, Protection
- Facet F: Organisation, Administration

Notation was solely alphabetic, with the sub-facets organized hierarchically using extended codes, such as "g Industrial equipment and processes", "ge Machines".

=== Art and Architecture Thesaurus (AAT) ===
While not strictly a classification system, the AAT uses facets similar to those of Ranganathan's Colon Classification:

- Associated Concepts (e.g., philosophy)
- Physical Attributes
- Styles and Periods
- Agents (People/Organizations)
- Activities (similar to Ranganathan's Energy)
- Materials (similar to Ranganathan's Matter)
- Objects (similar to Ranganathan's Personality)

== Comparison between faceted and single hierarchical classification ==
Hierarchical classification refers to the classification of objects using one single hierarchical taxonomy. Faceted classification may actually employ hierarchy in one or more of its facets, but allows for the use of more than one taxonomy to classify objects.

- Faceted classification systems allow the assignment of multiple classifications to an object, and enable those classifications to be applied by searchers in multiple ways, rather than in a single, predetermined order. Multiple facets may be used as a first step in a search process. For example, one may start from language or subject.
- Hierarchical classification systems are developed classes that are subdivided from the most general subjects to the most specific.
- Faceted classification systems allow for the combination of facets to filter the set of objects rapidly. In addition, the facets can be used to address multiple classification criteria.
- A faceted system focuses on the important, essential or persistent characteristics of content objects, helping it to be useful for categorization of fine-grained rapidly changing repositories.
- In faceted classification systems one does not have to know the name of the category into which an object is placed a priori. A controlled vocabulary is presented with the number of documents matching each vocabulary term.
- New facets may be created at any time without disruption of a single hierarchy or reorganizing other facets.
- Faceted classification systems make few assumptions about the scope and organization of the domain. It is difficult to break a faceted classification schema.

== See also ==
- Classification Research Group – Library science organisation
- Controlled vocabulary – Method of organizing knowledge
- Decimal classification
  - Universal Decimal Classification – Bibliographic and library classification system
- Findability – Ease of finding information on a website
- Folksonomy – Classification based on users' tags
- Information architecture – Structural design of shared information
- Tag (metadata) – Keyword assigned to information
