= LIBRIS =

Swedish national union catalogue

LIBRIS (Library Information System) is a Swedish national union catalogue maintained by the National Library of Sweden in Stockholm. It is possible to freely search about 6.5 million titles nationwide.

In addition to bibliographic records, one for each book or publication, LIBRIS also contains an authority file of people. For each person there is a record connecting name, birth and occupation with a unique identifier.

The MARC Code for the Swedish Union Catalog is SE-LIBR, normalized: selibr.

The development of LIBRIS can be traced to the mid-1960s. While rationalization of libraries had been an issue for two decades after World War II, it was in 1965 that a government committee published a report on the use of computers in research libraries. The government budget of 1965 created a research library council (Forskningsbiblioteksrådet, FBR). A preliminary design document, Biblioteksadministrativt Information System (BAIS) was published in May 1970, and the name LIBRIS, short for Library Information System, was used for a technical subcommittee that started on 1 July 1970. The newsletter LIBRIS-meddelanden (ISSN 0348-1891) has been published since 1972 and is online since 1997.

== See also ==
- Swedish library classification system
- List of libraries in Sweden
