= S. R. Ranganathan =

Indian mathematician and librarian

S. R. Ranganathan Iyer
- Born: Shiyali Ramamrita Ranganathan Iyer; 12 August 1892; Sirkazhi, Mayiladuthurai district, British India (present-day Tamil Nadu, India)
- Died: 27 September 1972 (aged 80); Bangalore, Mysore State, India (present-day Karnataka)
- Occupations: Librarian, author, academician, mathematician
- Relatives: Ranga Yogeshwar (Grandson)
- Writing career
- Genres: Library Science, Documentation, Staffing, Institutional Management, Information Science
- Notable works: Prolegomena to Library Classification; The Five Laws of Library Science; Colon Classification; Ramanujan: the Man and the Mathematician; Classified Catalogue Code: With Additional Rules for Dictionary Catalogue Code; Library Administration; Indian Library Manifesto; Library Manual for Library Authorities, Librarians, and Library Workers; Classification and Communication; Headings and Canons; Comparative Study of Five Catalogue Codes
- Notable awards: Padma Shri (1957)

Shiyali Ramamrita Ranganathan ( 12 August 1892 – 27 September 1972) was an Indian librarian and mathematician. S. R. Ranganathan is widely known as the “Father of Library Science in India.” His most notable contributions to the field were his five laws of library science and the development of the first major faceted classification system, the colon classification. He is considered to be the father of library science, documentation, and information science in India and is widely known throughout the rest of the world for his fundamental thinking in the field. His birthday is observed every year as National Librarian Day in India.

He was a university librarian and professor of library science at Banaras Hindu University (1945–47) and professor of library science at the University of Delhi (1947–55), the first Indian school of librarianship to offer higher degrees. He was president of the Indian Library Association from 1944 to 1953. In 1957 he was elected as an honorary member of the International Federation for Information and Documentation (FID) and was made vice-president for life of the Library Association of Great Britain.

== Early life and education ==
Ranganathan was born on 12 August 1892 in Siyali, Sirkazhi, Mayiladuthurai district, Tamil Nadu into a Brahmin family. His birth date is sometimes written as 12 August 1892 but he wrote his own birth date as 9 August 1892 in his book, The Five Laws of Library Science.

Ranganathan began his professional life as a mathematician; he earned B.A. and M.A. degrees in mathematics from Madras Christian College in his home state, and then went on to earn a teaching license in 1917. His lifelong goal was to teach mathematics, and he was successively a member of the mathematics faculties at universities in Mangalore, Coimbatore, and Madras. As a mathematics professor, he published papers mainly on the history of mathematics. His career as an educator was somewhat hindered by stammering (a difficulty he gradually overcame in his professional life). The government of India awarded the Padma Shri to Ranganathan in 1957 for valuable contributions to library science.

== Early career ==
In 1923, the University of Madras created the post of University Librarian to oversee their poorly organized collection. Among the 900 applicants for the position, none had any formal training in librarianship, and Ranganathan's handful of papers satisfied the search committee's requirement that the candidate should have a research background. His only knowledge of librarianship came from an Encyclopædia Britannica article he read days before the interview. Ranganathan was initially reluctant to pursue the position, and had forgotten about his application by the time he was called for an interview. To his surprise, he received the appointment and accepted the position in January 1924.

At first, Ranganathan found the solitude of the position intolerable. Within weeks, complaining of total boredom, he went back to the university administration to ask for his teaching position back. A deal was struck wherein Ranganathan would travel to London to study contemporary Western practices in librarianship and if he returned and still rejected librarianship as a career, the mathematics lectureship would be his again.

Ranganathan travelled to University College London, which at that time housed the only graduate degree program in library science in Britain. At University College, he earned marks only slightly above average, but his mathematical background made him latch onto the problem of classification, a subject typically taught by rote in library programs of the time. As an outsider, he focused on what he perceived to be flaws with the popular decimal classification, and began to explore new possibilities on his own.

He also devised the Acknowledgment of Duplication, which states that any system of classification of information necessarily implies at least two different classifications for any given datum. He anecdotally proved this with the Dewey Decimal Classification (DDC) by taking several books and showing how each might be classified with two totally different resultant DDC numbers. For example, a book on "warfare in India" could be classified under "warfare" or "India". Even a general book on warfare could be classified under "warfare", "history", "social organisation", "Indian essays", or many other headings, depending upon the viewpoint, needs, and prejudices of the classifier. To Ranganathan, a structured, step-by-step system acknowledging each facet of the topic of the work was preferable to the "intellectual laziness" (as he termed it) of the DDC. Given the poor technology for information retrieval available at that time, the implementation of this concept was a large step forwards for the science of information retrieval.

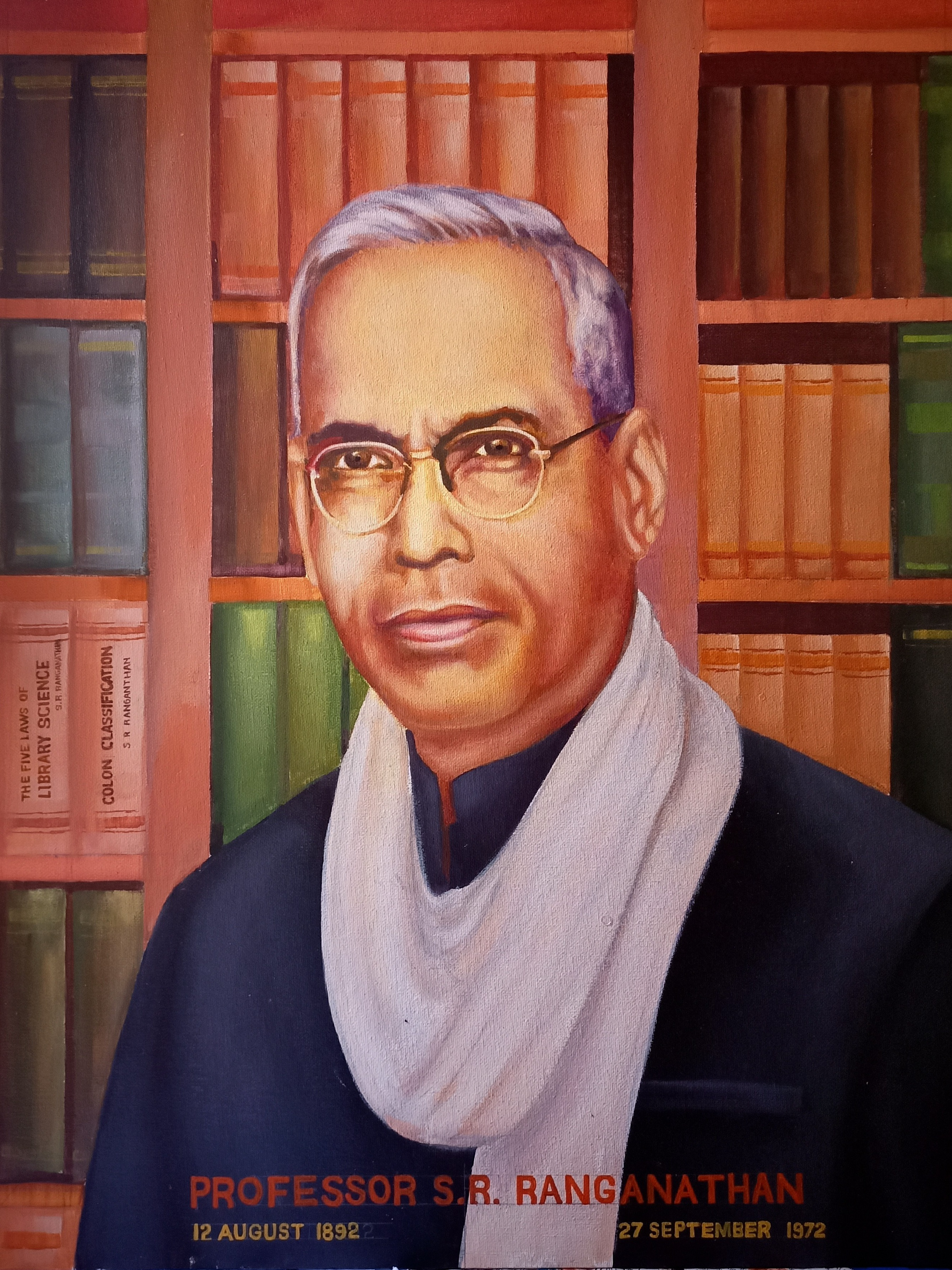
Portrait of SR Ranganathan preserved in SKB Library of Cotton University, Guwahati, Assam which has been a premier educational institute of Northeast India since 1901.

He began drafting the system that would ultimately become colon classification while in England, and refined it as he returned home, even reordering the ship's library on his voyage back to India. He initially got the idea for the system from seeing a Meccano set in a toy store in London. Ranganathan returned with interest in librarianship and a vision of its importance for India. He returned to and held the position of University Librarian at the University of Madras for twenty years. During that time, he helped to found the Madras Library Association, and lobbied actively for the establishment of free public libraries throughout India and for the creation of a comprehensive national library.

Ranganathan was considered by many to be a workaholic. During his two decades in Madras, he consistently worked 13-hour days, seven days a week, without taking vacations. Although he married in November 1928, he returned to work the afternoon following the marriage ceremony. A few years later, he and his wife Sarada had a son. The couple remained married until Ranganathan's death.

The first few years of Ranganathan's tenure at Madras were years of deliberation and analysis as he addressed the problems of library administration and classification. It was during this period that he produced what have come to be known as his two greatest legacies: his five laws of library science (1931) and the colon classification system (1933).

Ranganathan sought to institute massive changes to the library system and to write about such things as open access and education for all. His changes to the library resulted in more available education and information available to all, including women and minorities. When writing about the harmful effects of low budget on the good functioning of a library, Ranganathan described it as "making an Ulster of the ... law of parsimony."

== Later career ==
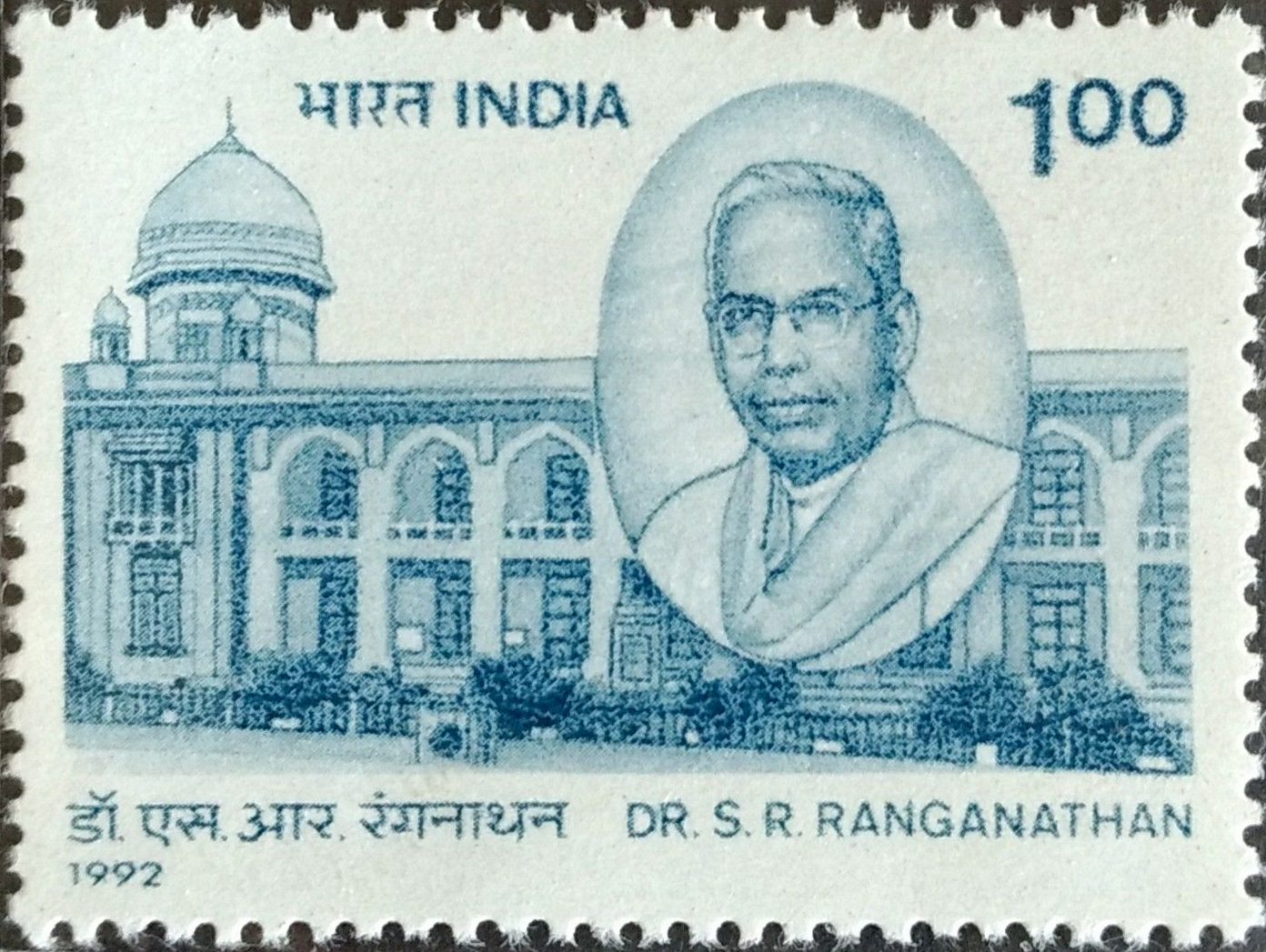
Ranganathan on a 1992 stamp of India

After two decades of serving as librarian at Madras – a post he had intended to keep until his retirement –, Ranganathan resigned from his position at the age of 54 after conflicts with a new university vice-chancellor. After a brief bout with depression, he accepted a professorship in library science at Banaras Hindu University in Varanasi, his last formal academic position, in August 1945. There, he catalogued the university's collection; by the time he left four years later, he had personally classified over 100,000 items.

Ranganathan headed the Indian Library Association from 1944 to 1953, but left amid controversy when the Delhi Public Library chose to use the Dewey Decimal Classification system instead of his own colon classification. He held an honorary professorship at Delhi University from 1949 to 1955 and helped build that institution's library science programs with Surendranath Dasgupta, a former student of his. While at Delhi, Ranganathan drafted a comprehensive 30-year plan for the development of an advanced library system for the whole of India. In 1951, Ranganathan released an album on Folkways Records entitled, Readings from the Ramayana: In Sanskrit Bhagavad Gita.

Ranganathan briefly moved to Zürich from 1955 to 1957, when his son married a European woman; this allowed him to expand his contacts within the European library community, where he gained a significant following. However, he soon returned to India and settled in the city of Bangalore, where he spent the rest of his life. While in Zürich, he endowed a professorship at Madras University in honour of his wife.

Ranganathan established the Documentation Research and Training Centre of the Indian Statistical Institute in Bangalore in 1962, where he served as honorary director for five years. In 1965, the Indian government honoured him for his contributions to the field with the title of National Research Professor.

In the final years of his life, Ranganathan suffered from ill health and was largely confined to his bed. On 27 September 1972, he succumbed to complications from bronchitis.

Upon the 1992 centenary of his birth, several biographical volumes and collections of essays on Ranganathan's influence were published in his honour. Ranganathan's autobiography, published serially during his life, is titled A Librarian Looks Back.

== Influence and legacy ==
Ranganathan dedicated his book The Five Laws of Library Science to his maths tutor at Madras Christian College, Edward Burns Ross. Ranganathan’s influence was analyzed bibliometrically in 1992. His birthday, August 12, has been denoted National Librarians' Day in India.

In 2001, S.R. Ranganathan: Pragmatic philosopher of information science, a personal biography by Ranganathan Yogeshwar (son of Ranganathan) was published by Bharatiya Vidya Bhavan. The book offers an insider's perspective to the thought process, ideas, and contributions of Ranganathan to the field. It is liberally sprinkled with personal and professional photos as well as quotes which showcase Ranganathan's values and motivation. The book serves as an important historical document of information science development in India (e.g. birth of Madras Library Association in 1928 and its growth) and the world during Ranganathan's lifetime (1892-1972) through two world wars, Indian independence, and the building of a democratic nation.

== See also ==
- Colon classification
- Faceted classification
- Five laws of library science
- Madras Public Libraries Act
- Subject (documents)

== Cited sources ==
- Srivastava, Anand P. (1977). Ranganathan, a Pattern Maker: A Syndetic Study of His Contributions. New Delhi: Metropolitan Book Company.
