= Cutter Expansive Classification =

Library classification system

The Cutter Expansive Classification system is a library classification system devised by Charles Ammi Cutter. The system was the basis for the top categories of the Library of Congress Classification.

== History ==
Charles Ammi Cutter, inspired by the decimal classification of his contemporary Melvil Dewey, and with Dewey's initial encouragement, developed his own classification scheme for the Winchester, Massachusetts town library and then the Boston Athenæum, at which he served as librarian for twenty-four years. He began work on it around the year 1880, publishing an overview of the new system in 1882. The same classification would later be used, but with a different notation, also devised by Cutter, at the Cary Library in Lexington, Massachusetts.

Many libraries found this system too detailed and complex for their needs, and Cutter received many requests from librarians at small libraries who wanted the classification adapted for their collections. While numbers and letters are required in large library classifications, small libraries did not need their classification system to be too specific. He devised the Expansive Classification in response, to meet the needs of growing libraries, and to address some of the complaints of his critics.

Cutter completed and published an introduction and schedules for the first six classifications of his new system (Expansive Classification: Part I: The First Six Classifications), but his work on the seventh was interrupted by his death in 1903.

The Cutter Expansive Classification, although adopted by comparatively few libraries, has been called one of the most logical and scholarly of American classifications.

Library historian Leo E. LaMontagne wrote:

Cutter produced the best classification of the nineteenth century. While his system was less "scientific" than that of J. P. Lesley, its other key features – notation, specificity, and versatility – make it deserving of the praise it has received.

Its top level divisions served as a basis for the Library of Congress Classification, which also took over some of its features. It did not catch on as did Dewey's system because Cutter died before it was completely finished, making no provision for the kind of development necessary as the bounds of knowledge expanded and scholarly emphases changed throughout the twentieth century.

== Structure ==
The Expansive Classification uses seven separate schedules, each designed to be used by libraries of different sizes. After the first, each schedule was an expansion of the previous one, and Cutter provided instructions for how a library might change from one expansion to another as it grows.

== Summary of schedules ==
=== First classification ===
The first classification is meant for very small libraries. The first classification has only seven top-level classes, and only eight classes in total:

- A Works of reference and general works which include several of the following sections, and so could not go in any one.
- B Philosophy and Religion
- E Biography
- F History and Geography and Travels
- H Social sciences
- L Natural sciences and Arts
- Y Language and Literature
- YF Fiction

=== Further classifications ===
Further expansions add more top-level classes and subdivisions. Many subclasses arranged systematically, with common divisions, such as those by geography and language, following a consistent system throughout.

By the fifth classification all the letters of the alphabet are in use for top-level classes. These are:

- A General Works
- B Philosophy
- C Christianity and Judaism
- D Ecclesiastical History
- E Biography
- F History, Universal History
- G Geography and Travels
- H Social Sciences
- I Demotics, Sociology
- J Civics, Government, Political Science
- K Legislation
- L Science and Arts together
- M Natural History
- N Botany
- O Zoology
- P Anthropology and Ethnology
- Q Medicine
- R Useful arts, Technology
- S Constructive arts (Engineering and Building)
- T Manufactures and Handicrafts
- U Art of War
- V Recreative arts, Sports, Games, Festivals
- W Art
- X English Language
- Y English and American literature
- Z Book arts

These schedules were not meant to be fixed, but were to be adapted to meet the needs of each library. For example, books on the English language may be put in X, and books on language in general in a subclass of X, or this can be reversed. The first option is less logical, but results in shorter marks for most English language libraries.

== Construction of call numbers ==
Most call numbers in the Expansive Classification follow conventions offering clues to the book's subject. The first line represents the subject, the second the author (and perhaps title), the third and fourth dates of editions, indications of translations, and critical works on particular books or authors. All numbers in the Expansive Classification are (or should be) shelved as if in decimal order.

Size of volumes is indicated by points (.), pluses (+), or slashes (/ or //).

For some subjects a numerical geographical subdivision follows the classification letters on the first line. The number 83 stands for the United States—hence, F83 is U.S. history, G83 U.S. travel, JU83 U.S. politics, WP83 U.S. painting. Geographical numbers are often further expanded decimally to represent more specific areas, sometimes followed by a capital letter indicating a particular city.

The second line usually represents the author's name by a capital letter plus one or more numbers arranged decimally. This may be followed by the first letter or letters of the title in lower-case, and/or sometimes the letters a, b, c indicating other printings of the same title. When appropriate, the second line may begin with a 'form' number—e.g., 1 stands for history and criticism of a subject, 2 for a bibliography, 5 for a dictionary, 6 for an atlas or maps, 7 for a periodical, 8 for a society or university publication, 9 for a collection of works by different authors.

On the third line a capital Y indicates a work about the author or book represented by the first two lines, and a capital E (for English—other letters are used for other languages) indicates a translation into English. If both criticism and translation apply to a single title, the number expands into four lines.

=== Cutter numbers ===
One of the features adopted by other systems, including Library of Congress, is the Cutter number or Cutter code. It is an alphanumeric device to code text so that it can be arranged in alphabetical order using the fewest characters. It contains one or two initial letters and Arabic numbers, treated as a decimal. To construct a Cutter number, a cataloguer consults a Cutter table as required by the classification rules. Although Cutter numbers are mostly used for coding the names of authors, the system can be used for titles, subjects, geographic areas, and more.

Cutter table for second character
If the first letter is a...	2	3	4	5	6	7	8	9
S	a	ch	e	h–i	m–p	t	u	w–z
Qu		a	e	i	o	r	t	y
other consonant		a	e	i	o	r	u	y
vowel	b	d	l–m	n	p	r	s–t	u–y

Cutter table for additional characters
2	3	4	5	6	7	8	9
	a–d	e–h	i–l	m–o	p–s	t–v	w–z

Initial letters Qa–Qt are assigned Q2–Q29, while entries beginning with numerals have a Cutter number A12–A19, therefore sorting before the first A entry.

So to make the three-digit Cutter number for "Cutter", one would start with "C", then looking under other consonants, find that "u" gives the number 8, and under additional letters, "t" is 8, giving a Cutter number of "C88".
