= Colon classification =

System of library classification

Colon classification (CC) is a library catalogue system developed by Shiyali Ramamrita Ranganathan. It was an early faceted (or analytico-synthetic) classification system. The first edition of colon classification was published in 1933, followed by six more editions. It is primarily used in libraries in India.

Its name originates from its use of colons to separate facets into classes. Many other classification schemes, some of which are unrelated, also use colons and other punctuation to perform various functions as, for example, the Universal Decimal Classification. Originally, CC used only the colon as a separator, but since the second edition, CC has used four other punctuation symbols to identify each facet type.

In CC, facets describe "personality" (the most specific subject), matter, energy, space, and time (PMEST). These facets are generally associated with every item in a library, and thus form a reasonably universal sorting system.

As an example, the subject "research in the cure of tuberculosis of lungs by x-ray conducted in India in 1950" would be categorized as:

Medicine,Lungs;Tuberculosis:Treatment;X-ray:Research.India'1950

This is summarized in a specific call number:

L,45;421:6;253:f.44'N5 

== Organization ==
The colon classification system uses 42 main classes that are combined with other letters, numbers, and marks in a manner resembling the Library of Congress Classification.

=== Facets ===
CC uses five primary categories, or facets, to specify the sorting of a publication. Collectively, they are called PMEST:

Indicator	Facet
,	Personality, the most specific or focal subject
;	Matter or property, the substance, properties or materials of the subject.
:	Energy, including the processes, operations and activities.
.	Space, which relates to the geographic location of the subject.
'	Time, which refers to the dates or seasons of the subject.

Other symbols can be used to indicate components of facets called isolates, and to specify complex combinations or relationships between disciplines.

=== Classes ===
The following are the main classes of CC, with some subclasses, the main method used to sort the subclass using the PMEST scheme and examples showing application of PMEST.

- z Generalia
- 1 Universe of Knowledge
- 2 Library Science
- 3 Book science
- 4 Journalism
- A Natural science
- B Mathematics
  - B2 Algebra
- C Physics
- D Engineering
- E Chemistry
- F Technology
- G Biology
- H Geology
  - HX Mining
- I Botany
- J Agriculture
  - J1 Horticulture
  - J2 Feed
  - J3 Food
  - J4 Stimulant
  - J5 Oil
  - J6 Drug
  - J7 Fabric
  - J8 Dye
- K Zoology
  - KZ Animal Husbandry
- L Medicine
  - LZ3 Pharmacology
  - LZ5 Pharmacopoeia
- M Useful arts
  - M7 Textiles [material]:[work]
- Δ Spiritual experience and mysticism [religion],[entity]:[problem]
- N Fine arts
  - ND Sculpture
  - NN Engraving
  - NQ Painting
  - NR Music
- O Literature
- P Linguistics
- Q Religion
- R Philosophy
- S Psychology
- T Education
- U Geography
- V History
- W Political science
- X Economics
- Y Sociology
  - YZ Social Work
- Z Law

== Example ==
A common example of the colon classification is:

- "Research in the cure of the tuberculosis of lungs by x-ray conducted in India in 1950s":
- The main classification is Medicine;
  - (Medicine)
- Within Medicine, the Lungs are the main concern;
  - (Medicine,Lungs)
- The property of the Lungs is that they are afflicted with Tuberculosis;
  - (Medicine,Lungs;Tuberculosis)
- The Tuberculosis is being performed (:) on, that is the intent is to cure (Treatment);
  - (Medicine,Lungs;Tuberculosis:Treatment)
- The matter that we are treating the Tuberculosis with is X-Rays;
  - (Medicine,Lungs;Tuberculosis:Treatment;X-ray)
- And this discussion of treatment is regarding the Research phase;
  - (Medicine,Lungs;Tuberculosis:Treatment;X-ray:Research)
- This Research is performed within a geographical space (.), namely India;
  - (Medicine,Lungs;Tuberculosis:Treatment;X-ray:Research.India)
- During the time (') of 1950;
  - (Medicine,Lungs;Tuberculosis:Treatment;X-ray:Research.India'1950)
- And finally, translating into the codes listed for each subject and facet the classification becomes
  - L,45;421:6;253:f.44'N5
