= Dewey Decimal Classification =

Library classification system

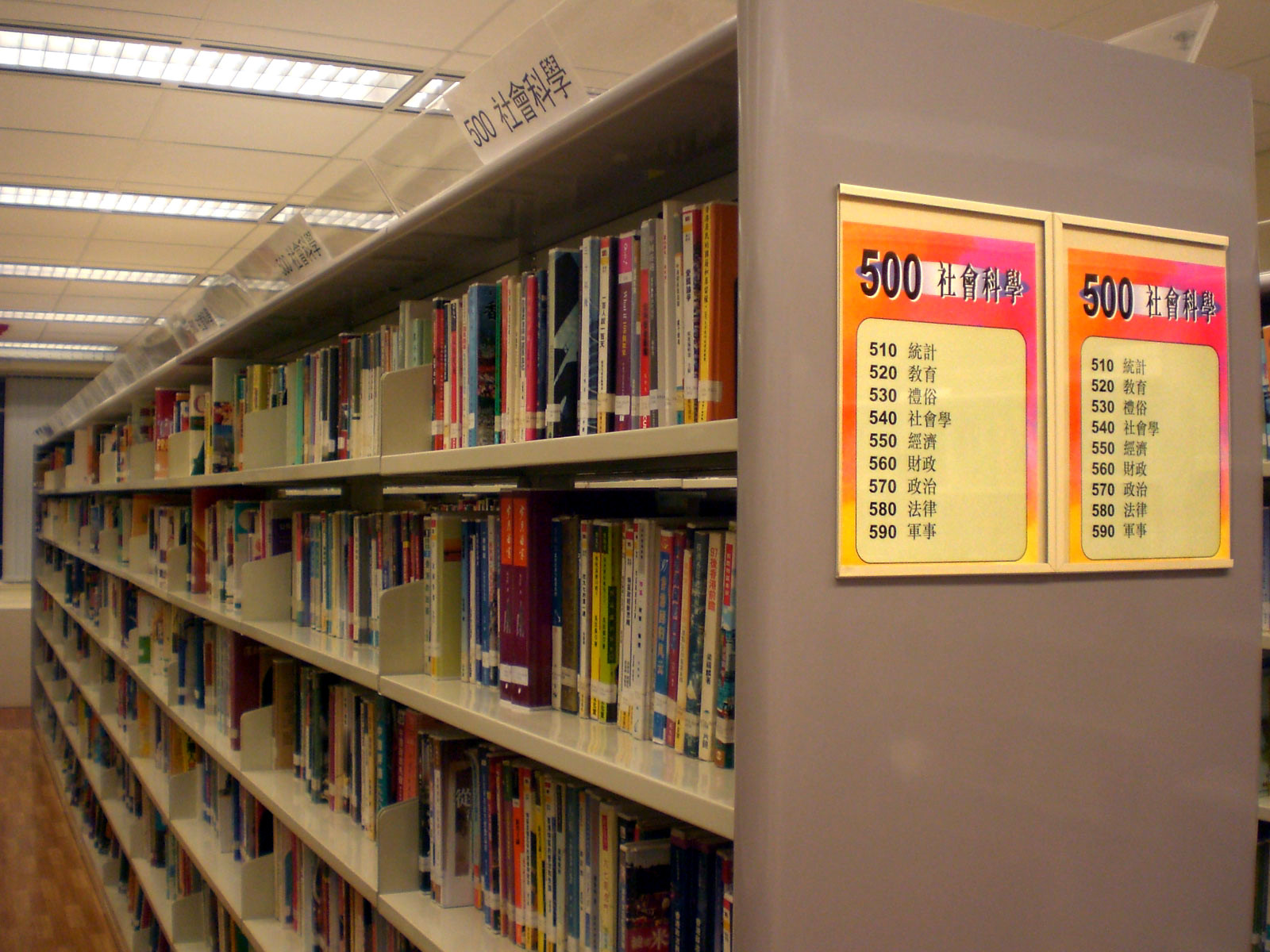
A library bookshelf in Hong Kong classified using the New Classification Scheme for Chinese Libraries, an adaptation of the Dewey Classification scheme

The Dewey Decimal Classification (DDC; /ˈduː.iː/ DOO-ee, /ˈdjuː.iː/ DYOO-ee), colloquially known as the Dewey Decimal System, is a proprietary library classification system which organizes books based on discipline and subject. It was first published in the United States by Melvil Dewey in 1876. Originally described in a 44-page pamphlet, it has been expanded to multiple volumes and revised through 23 major editions, the latest printed in 2011. It is also available in an abridged version suitable for smaller libraries. OCLC, a non-profit cooperative that serves libraries, currently maintains the system and licenses online access to WebDewey, a continuously updated version for catalogers.

The decimal number classification made use of the concepts of relative location and relative index. This contrasted to the library practice in which books were given permanent shelf locations that were related to their order of acquisition rather than topic. The classification's notation makes use of three-digit numbers for main classes, with fractional decimals allowing expansion for further detail. A library assigns a classification number that unambiguously locates a particular volume in a position relative to other books in the library, on the basis of its subject. The number makes it possible to find any book and to return it to its proper place on the library shelves. As of 2009 the classification system is used in 200,000 libraries in at least 135 countries.

== History ==
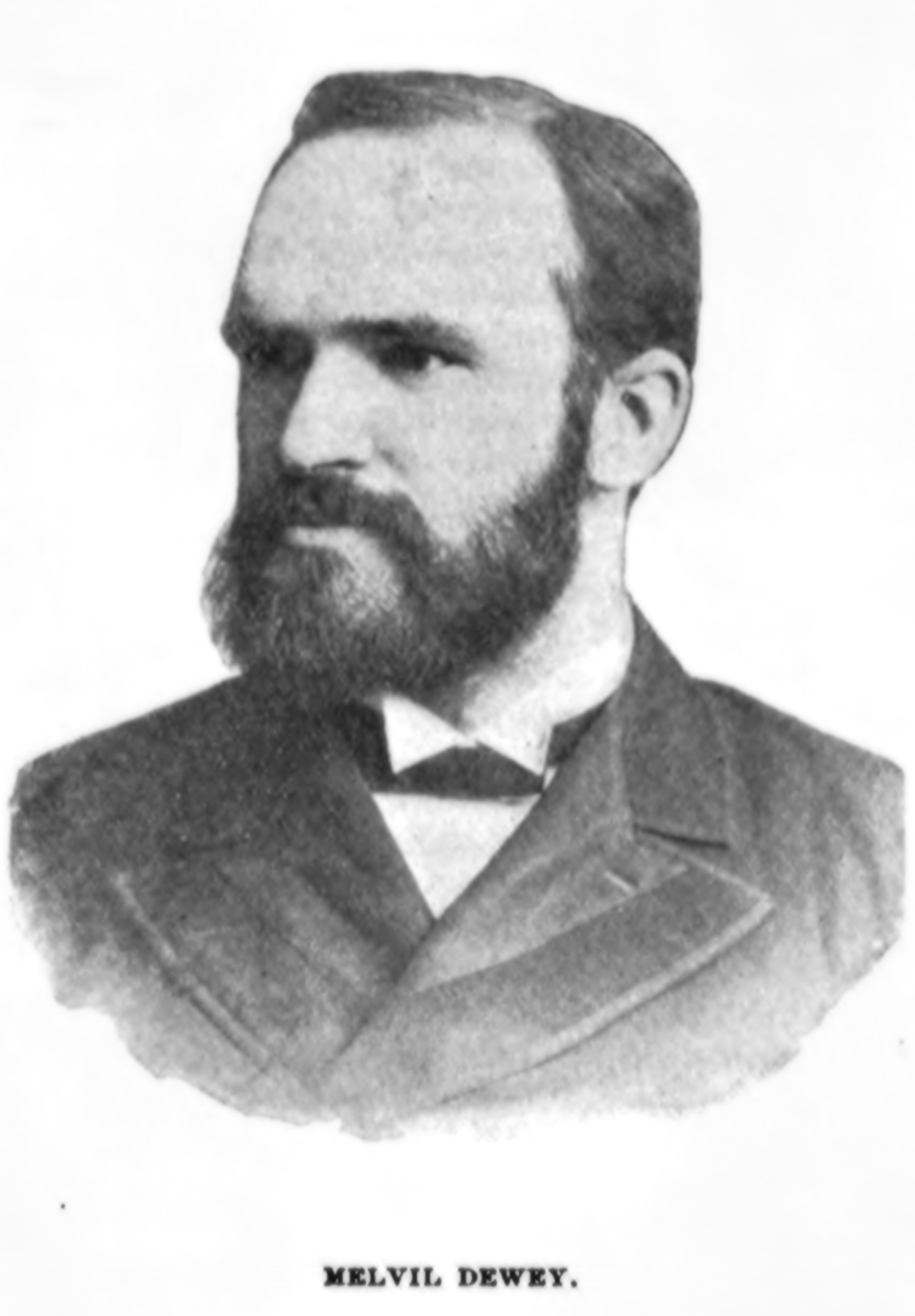
Melvil Dewey, the inventor of the Dewey Decimal classification

=== 1873–1885: early development ===
Melvil Dewey (1851–1931) was an American librarian and self-declared reformer. He was a founding member of the American Library Association and can be credited with the promotion of card systems in libraries and business. He developed the ideas for his library classification system in 1873 while working at the Amherst College library. He applied the classification to the books in that library, until in 1876 he had a first version of the classification. In 1876, he published the classification in pamphlet form with the title A Classification and Subject Index for Cataloguing and Arranging the Books and Pamphlets of a Library. He used the pamphlet, published in more than one version during the year, to solicit comments from other librarians. It is not known how many copies were distributed but Amherst College, where Dewey worked at the time, had authorized 50 copies for the first version. His classification system was mentioned in an article in the first issue of the Library Journal and in an article by Dewey in the Department of Education publication Public Libraries in America in 1876. In March 1876, he applied for, and received, copyright on the first edition of the index. The edition was 44 pages in length, with 2,000 index entries, and was printed in 200 copies.

=== 1885–1942: period of adoption ===
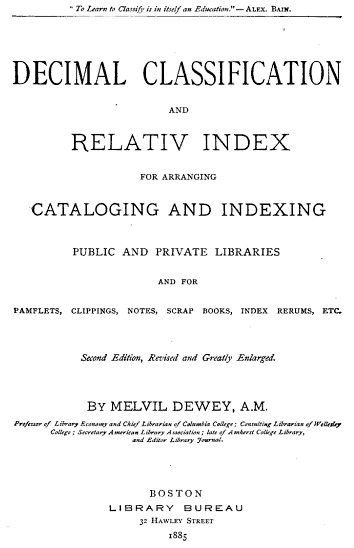
1885 – Dewey Decimal Classification

The second edition of the Dewey Decimal system, published in 1885 with the title Decimal Classification and Relativ Index for arranging, cataloging, and indexing public and private libraries and for pamflets, clippings, notes, scrap books, index rerums, etc., (Note: The title makes use of Dewey's "reformed spelling" in some areas.) comprised 314 pages, with 10,000 index entries. Five hundred copies were produced. Editions 3–14, published between 1888 and 1942, used a variant of this same title. Dewey modified and expanded his system considerably for the second edition. In an introduction to that edition Dewey states that "nearly 100 persons hav (Note: Spelling of have per English-language spelling reform, which Dewey championed.) contributed criticisms and suggestions".

One of the innovations of the Dewey Decimal system was that of positioning books on the shelves in relation to other books on similar topics. When the system was first introduced, most libraries in the US used fixed positioning: each book was assigned a permanent shelf position based on the book's height and date of acquisition. Library stacks were generally closed to all but the most privileged patrons, so shelf browsing was not considered of importance. The use of the Dewey Decimal system increased during the early 20th century as librarians were convinced of the advantages of relative positioning and of open shelf access for patrons.

New editions were readied as supplies of previously published editions were exhausted, even though some editions provided little change from the previous, as they were primarily needed to fulfill demand. In the next decade, three editions followed closely on: the 3rd (1888), 4th (1891), and 5th (1894). Editions 6 through 11 were published from 1899 to 1922. The 6th edition was published in a record 7,600 copies, although subsequent editions were much lower. During this time, the size of the volume grew, and edition 12 swelled to 1,243 pages, an increase of 25% over the previous edition.

In response to the needs of smaller libraries which were finding the expanded classification schedules difficult to use, in 1894, the first abridged edition of the Dewey Decimal system was produced. The abridged edition generally parallels the full edition, and has been developed for most full editions since that date. By popular request, in 1930, the Library of Congress began to print Dewey Classification numbers on nearly all of its cards, thus making the system immediately available to all libraries making use of the Library of Congress card sets.

Dewey's was not the only library classification available, although it was the most complete. Charles Ammi Cutter published the Expansive Classification in 1891, with initial encouragement from Melvil Dewey. Cutter's system was not adopted by many libraries, with one major exception: it was used as the basis for the Library of Congress Classification system.

In 1895, the International Institute of Bibliography, located in Belgium and led by Paul Otlet, contacted Dewey about the possibility of translating the classification into French, and using the classification system for bibliographies (as opposed to its use for books in libraries). This would have required some changes to the classification, which was under copyright. Dewey gave permission for the creation of a version intended for bibliographies, and also for its translation into French. Dewey did not agree, however, to allow the International Institute of Bibliography to later create an English version of the resulting classification, considering that a violation of their agreement, as well as a violation of Dewey's copyright. Shortly after Dewey's death in 1931, however, an agreement was reached between the committee overseeing the development of the Decimal Classification and the developers of the French Classification Decimal. The English version was published as the Universal Decimal Classification and is still in use today.

According to a study done in 1927, the Dewey system was used in the US in approximately 96% of responding public libraries and 89% of the college libraries. After the death of Melvil Dewey in 1931, administration of the classification was under the Decimal Classification Committee of the Lake Placid Club Education Foundation, and the editorial body was the Decimal Classification Editorial Policy Committee with participation of the American Library Association (ALA), Library of Congress, and Forest Press. By the 14th edition in 1942, the Dewey Decimal Classification index was over 1,900 pages in length and was published in two volumes.

=== 1942–present: forging an identity ===
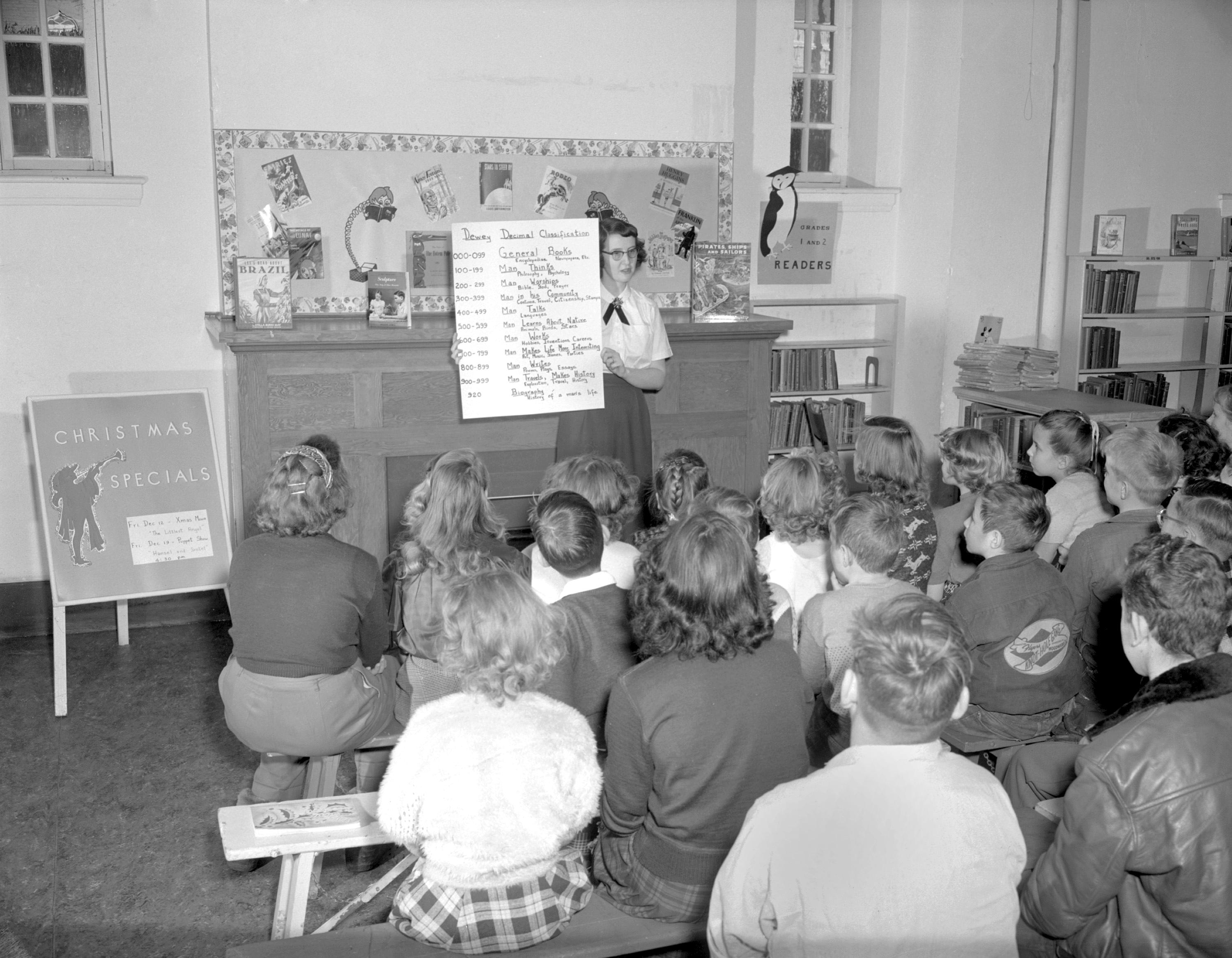
Children being taught the top-level categories of the Dewey Decimal Classification system at a library in Edmonton, Alberta, Canada, in the 1960s

The growth of the classification to date had led to significant criticism from medium and large libraries which were too large to use the abridged edition but found the full classification overwhelming. Dewey had intended issuing the classification in three editions: the library edition, which would be the fullest edition; the bibliographic edition, in English and French, which was to be used for the organization of bibliographies rather than of books on the shelf; and the abridged edition. In 1933, the bibliographic edition became the Universal Decimal Classification, which left the library and abridged versions as the formal Dewey Decimal Classification editions. The 15th edition, edited by Milton Ferguson, implemented the growing concept of the "standard edition", designed for the majority of general libraries but not attempting to satisfy the needs of the very largest or of special libraries. It also reduced the size of the Dewey system by over half, from 1,900 to 700 pages. This revision was so radical that an advisory committee was formed right away for the 16th and 17th editions. The 16th and 17th editions, under the editorship of the Library of Congress, grew again to two volumes. However, by then, the Dewey Decimal system had established itself as a classification for general libraries, with the Library of Congress Classification having gained acceptance for large research libraries.

The first electronic version of "Dewey" was created in 1993. Hard-copy editions continue to be issued at intervals; the online WebDewey and Abridged WebDewey are updated quarterly.

== Administration and publication ==
Dewey and a small editorial staff managed the administration of the very early editions. Beginning in 1922, the Lake Placid Club Educational Foundation, a not-for-profit organization founded by Melvil Dewey, managed administrative affairs. The ALA set up a Special Advisory Committee on the Decimal Classification as part of the Cataloging and Classification division of ALA in 1952. The previous Decimal Classification Committee was changed to the Decimal Classification Editorial Policy Committee, with participation of the ALA Division of Cataloging and Classification, and of the Library of Congress.

Melvil Dewey edited the first three editions of the classification system and oversaw the revisions of all editions until his death in 1931. May Seymour became editor in 1891 and served until her death in 1921. She was followed by Dorcas Fellows, who was editor until her death in 1938. Constantin J. Mazney edited the 14th edition. Milton Ferguson functioned as editor from 1949 to 1951. The 16th edition in 1958 was edited under an agreement between the Library of Congress and Forest Press, with David Haykin as director. Editions 16–19 were edited by Benjamin A. Custer and the editor of edition 20 was John P. Comaromi. Joan Mitchell was editor until 2013, covering editions 21 to 23. In 2013 Michael Panzer of OCLC became Editor-in-Chief. The Dewey Editorial Program Manager since 2016 has been Rebecca Green.

Dewey himself held copyright in editions 1 to 6 (1876–1919). Copyright in editions 7–10 was held by the publisher, The Library Bureau. On the death of May Seymour, Dewey conveyed the "copyrights and control of all editions" to the Lake Placid Club Educational Foundation, a non-profit chartered in 1922. The Online Computer Library Center of Dublin, Ohio, U.S., acquired the trademark and copyrights associated with the Dewey Decimal Classification system when it bought Forest Press in 1988. In 2003 the Dewey Decimal Classification came to the attention of the U.S. press when OCLC sued the Library Hotel for trademark infringement for using the classification system as the hotel theme. The case was settled shortly thereafter.

The OCLC has maintained the classification since 1988, and also publishes new editions of the system. The editorial staff responsible for updates is based partly at the Library of Congress and partly at OCLC. Their work is reviewed by the Decimal Classification Editorial Policy Committee, a ten-member international board which meets twice each year. The four-volume unabridged edition was published approximately every six years, with the last edition (DDC 23) published in mid-2011. In 2017 the editorial staff announced that the English edition of DDC will no longer be printed, in favor of using the frequently updated WebDewey. An experimental version of Dewey in RDF was available at dewey.info beginning in 2009, but has not been available since 2015.

In addition to the full version, a single-volume abridged edition designed for libraries with 20,000 titles or fewer has been made available since 1895. The last printed English abridged edition, Abridged Edition 15, was published in early 2012.

Full edition	Publication year	Abridged edition	Publication year
1st	1876		
2nd	1885		
3rd	1888		
4th	1891		
5th	1894	1st	1895
6th	1899		
7th	1911		
8th	1913	2nd	1915
9th	1915		
10th	1919		
11th	1922	3rd	1926
12th	1927	4th	1929
13th	1932	5th	1936
14th	1942	6th	1945
15th	1951	7th	1953
16th	1958	8th	1959
17th	1965	9th	1965
18th	1971	10th	1971
19th	1979	11th	1979
20th	1989	12th	1990
21st	1996	13th	1997
22nd	2003	14th	2004
23rd	2011	15th	2012

== Design ==
The Dewey Decimal Classification organizes library materials by discipline or field of study. The scheme comprises ten classes, each divided into ten divisions, each having ten sections. The system's notation uses Indo-Arabic numbers, with three whole numbers making up the main classes and sub-classes and decimals designating further divisions. The classification structure is hierarchical and the notation follows the same hierarchy. Libraries not needing the full level of detail of the classification can trim right-most decimal digits from the class number to obtain more general classifications. For example:

500 Natural sciences and mathematics
510 Mathematics
516 Geometry
516.3 Analytic geometries
516.37 Metric differential geometries
516.375 Finsler geometry

The classification was originally enumerative, meaning that it listed all of the classes explicitly in the schedules. Over time it added some aspects of a faceted classification scheme, allowing classifiers to construct a number by combining a class number for a topic with an entry from a separate table. Tables cover commonly used elements such as geographical and temporal aspects, language, and bibliographic forms. For example, a class number could be constructed using 330 for economics + .9 for geographic treatment + .04 for Europe to create the class 330.94 European economy. Or one could combine the class 973 (for the United States) + .05 (for periodical publications on the topic) to arrive at the number 973.05 for periodicals concerning the United States generally. The classification also makes use of mnemonics in some areas, such that the number 5 represents the country Italy in classification numbers like 945 (history of Italy), 450 (Italian language), and 195 (Italian philosophy). The combination of faceting and mnemonics makes the classification synthetic in nature, with meaning built into parts of the classification number.

A book on the library shelf usually has a two part designation: a class number from the Dewey system and a book number that "prevents confusion of different books on the same subject". A common form of the book number is called a Cutter number, which is alpha-numeric and represents the author.

=== Classes ===
(From DDC 23)

- 000 – Computer science, information and general works
- 100 – Philosophy and psychology
- 200 – Religion
- 300 – Social sciences
- 400 – Language
- 500 – Pure science
- 600 – Technology
- 700 – Arts and recreation
- 800 – Literature
- 900 – History and geography

=== Tables ===
(From DDC 23)

- T1 Standard Subdivisions
- T2 Geographic Areas, Historical Periods, Biography
- T3 Subdivisions for the Arts, for Individual Literatures, for Specific Literary Forms
  - T3A Subdivisions for Works by or about Individual Authors
  - T3B Subdivisions for Works by or about More than One Author
  - T3C Notation to Be Added Where Instructed in Table 3B, 700.4, 791.4, 808–809
- T4 Subdivisions of Individual Languages and Language Families
- T5 Ethnic and National Groups
- T6 Languages

=== Relative Index ===
The Relative Index (or, as Dewey spelled it, "Relativ Index") is an alphabetical index to the classification, for use both by classifiers and by library users when seeking books by topic. The index was "relative" because the index entries pointed to the class numbers, not to the page numbers of the printed classification schedule. In this way, the Dewey Decimal Classification itself had the same relative positioning as the library shelf and could be used either as an entry point to the classification, by catalogers, or as an index to a Dewey-classed library itself.

== Influence and criticism ==
Dewey Decimal Classification numbers formed the basis of the Universal Decimal Classification (UDC), which combines the basic Dewey numbers with selected punctuation marks (comma, colon, parentheses, etc.). Adaptations of the system for specific regions outside the English-speaking world include the Korean Decimal Classification, the New Classification Scheme for Chinese Libraries, and the Nippon Decimal Classification in Japan.

The classification has been criticized for its complexity and its limited capability for amendment. This is particularly demonstrated with the literature section (800s): literature in European languages takes the entire range from 810 through 889, while the entire rest of the world's literature is relegated to the 890s. In 2007–08, the Maricopa County Library District in Arizona abandoned the DDC in favor of the Book Industry Standards and Communications (BISAC) system commonly used by commercial bookstores, in an effort to make its libraries more accessible for their users. Several other libraries across the United States and other countries (including Canada and the Netherlands) followed suit.

=== Treatment of homosexuality ===
In 1932, topics relating to homosexuality were first added to the system under 132 (mental derangements) and 159.9 (abnormal psychology). In 1952, homosexuality was also included under 301.424 (the study of sexes in society). In 1989, it was added to 363.4 (controversies related to public morals and custom), a classification that continues as of the 23rd edition.

In 1996, homosexuality was added to 306.7 (sexual relations); this remains the preferred location in the current edition. Although books can also be found under 616.8583 (sexual practices viewed as medical disorders), the official direction states:

Use 616.8583 for homosexuality only when the work treats homosexuality as a medical disorder, or focuses on arguing against the views of those who consider homosexuality to be a medical disorder.

=== Treatment of religion ===
The top-level class for religion heavily favors Christianity, dedicating nearly all of the 200 division to it: the world's thousands of other religions were listed under the 290s. Dewey's system had the practical goal of providing a system capable of cataloging the published works available in North American libraries at the time. This has led libraries to modify the 200 range to give more space to other religions, which is useful for theological libraries in countries where religions other than Christianity are predominant.

=== Treatment of women ===
It has also been argued by Hope A. Olson that the placement of topics related to women shows implicit bias, but this has been simpler to address than the religion schema. Some changes made so far have been in numerical proximity, altering the placement of topics relative to each other. For example, in older versions of the DDC, some categories regarding women were adjacent to categories on etiquette; the placement of these categories next to each other imposed an association of etiquette with women, rather than treating it as gender-neutral. This was changed in DDC version 17, in 1965.

== See also ==
- Comparison of Dewey and Library of Congress subject classification
