= Outline of books =

Overview of and topical guide to books

The following outline is provided as an overview of and topical guide to books.

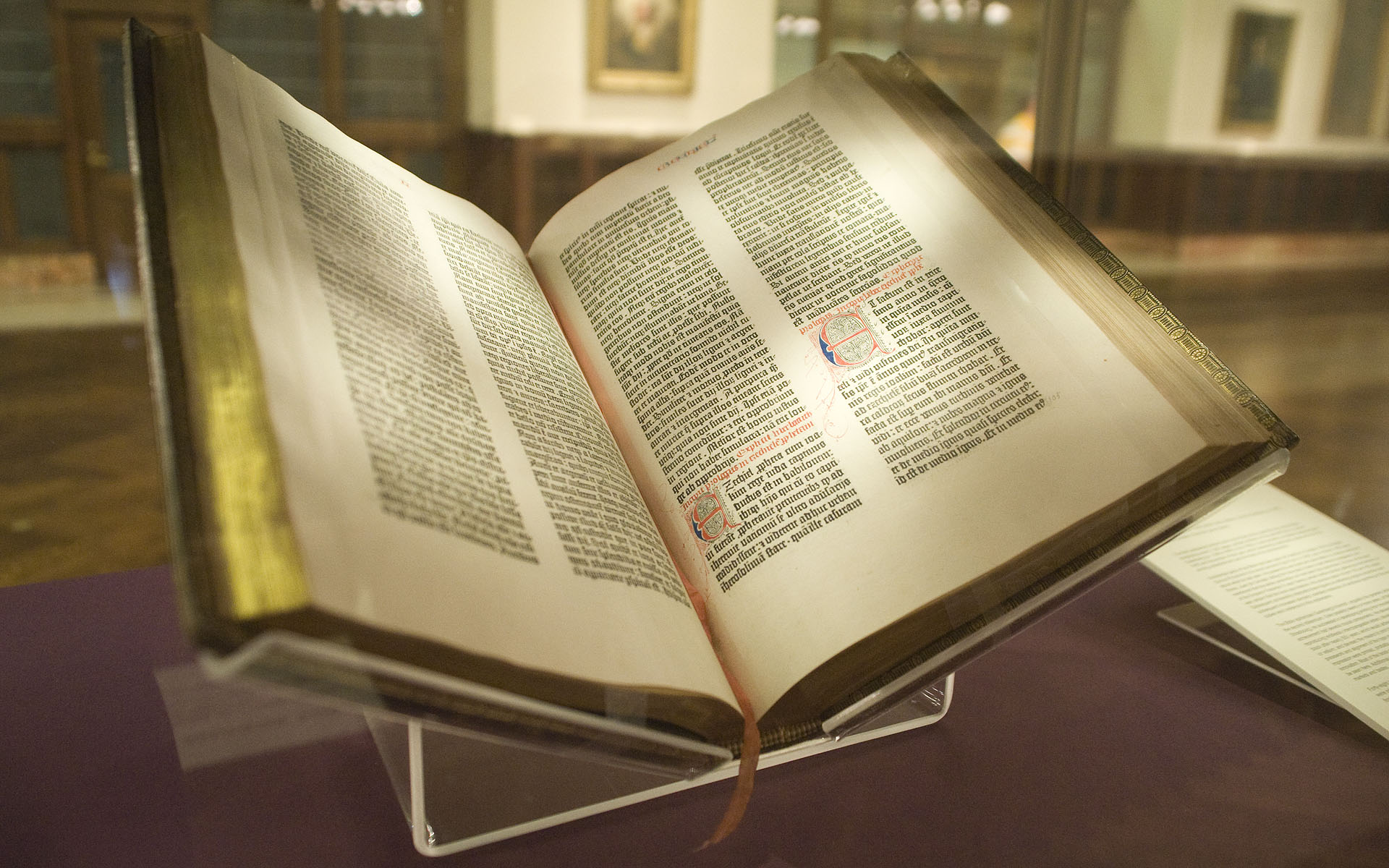
Gutenberg Bible, Lenox Copy, New York Public Library, 2009

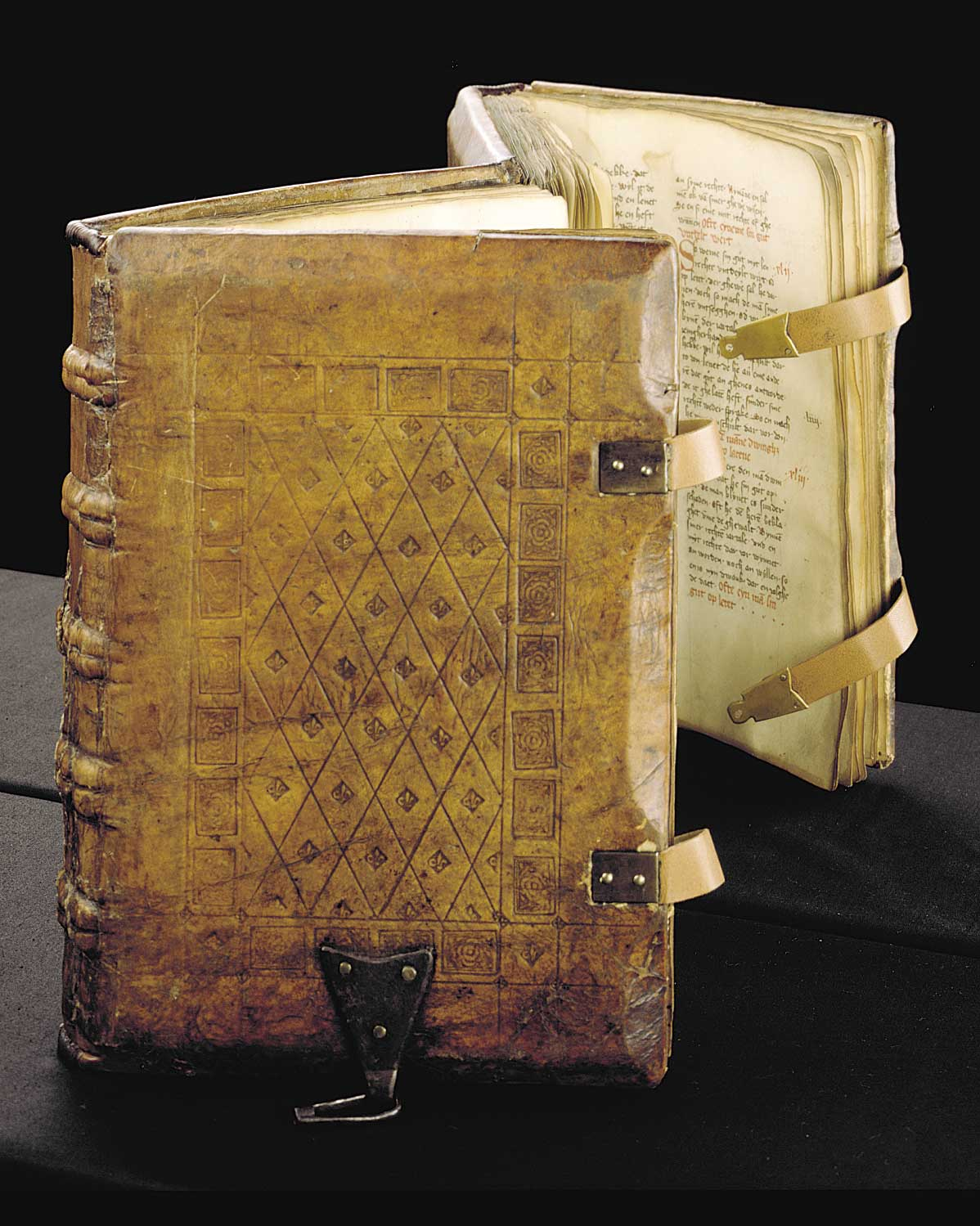
Sachsenspiegel

A book is a written work of substantial length created by one or more authors. The work is typically printed on many sheets of paper as pages bound together into a bookblock, then glued to the middle of a foldable cover that protects the pages. Before the wide adoption of the modern printing press, codices were used to create handwritten manuscripts. Older writing media include scrolls and clay tablets. Nowadays, books can be distributed in other forms like audiobooks, and electronic books (ebooks). Books are broadly classified into fiction, which contains invented or imaginary narratives; and non-fiction, which contains content intended as factual truth.

== Types of books ==
Physical types of books not to be confused with literary genres or types of literature.

- Advance copy – a free promotional copy of a book given by a publisher to booksellers, librarians, journalists, or others, or as a contest or school prize, before the book is printed for mass distribution.
- Alphabet book – a book primarily designed for young children representing letters of the alphabet with corresponding words and/or images.
- Alternative formats – another version of a standard printed book such as audio, braille, electronic or large print versions
- Audiobook – a recorded reading of a physical book
- Autograph book – a book for collecting the autographs of others
  - Confession album – a type of autograph book with set of questions
- Banned book – a book or other printed works which are prohibited by law or to which free access is not permitted by other means
- Bestseller – a book that is included on a list of top-selling or frequently-borrowed titles
- Blook – a printed book that contains or is based on content from a blog
- Board book – a type of book printed on thick paperboard generally for children
- Book-and-record set – a set consisting of a picture storybook and an accompanying recording
- Book series – sequence of books that are formally identified together as a group
- Booklet – a small book or group of pages
  - Chapbook – an early type of cheap popular literature printed in early modern Europe in booklet format
  - Tract – booklets used for religious and political purposes
- Boxed Set – a compilation of books packaged in a box, for sale as a single unit
- Braille book – a book that is traditionally written with embossed paper for the blind or visually impaired
- Chapter book – a story book intended for intermediate readers, generally age 7–10
- Codex – a bound book constructed of a number of sheets of paper, vellum, papyrus, or similar materials
- Coffee table book – an oversized, usually hard-covered book whose purpose is for display on a table
- Coloring book – a book containing line art to which a reader may add color using crayons, colored pencils, marker pens, paint or other artistic media
- Comic book – a book or magazine that consists of comic art in the form of sequential juxtaposed panels that represent individual scenes
- Comedia suelta – an individual printing of a play
- Condolence book – a book in which people may record their condolences after a death or great tragedy.
- Cookbook – a collection of recipes
- Cordel literature – printed booklets or pamphlets containing folk novels, poems and songs.
- Diary and Journals – a private collection of thoughts or feelings, remembrances including comments on current events in book format
  - Commonplace book – writing information into books to compile knowledge
  - Dream diary – a diary for recording dreams
  - Personal Diary – a record (originally in handwritten format) with discrete entries arranged by date reporting on what has happened over the course of a day or other period
  - Scrapbook – a method, an art for preserving, presenting, arranging personal and family history in the form of a book
  - Travelogue or Travel Journal – is a record made by a traveller, sometimes in diary form, of the traveler's experiences, written during the course of the journey and later edited for publication
- Dummy book – an object designed to imitate the appearance of a real book, which may have blank pages or be entirely hollow
- E-book or Electronic Book – a book made available in digital form, consisting of text, images, or both readable on electronic devices
- Edited volume or collection – a collection of scholarly or scientific chapters written by different authors in book form
- Exhibition catalogue – a book which is either a printed list of exhibits at an art exhibition or a directory of exhibitors at a trade fair or business-to-business event
- Festival book – a book that commemorate a notable event such as a royal entry, coronation or wedding
- First Edition – a book from the first print run
- Festschrift – a book honoring a respected person, especially an academic, and presented during his or her lifetime
- Flip book – a book with a series of pictures that vary gradually from one page to the next, so that when the pages are turned rapidly, the pictures appear to animate by simulating motion or some other change
- Hardcover – a book bound with rigid protective covers (typically of cardboard covered with buckram or other cloth, heavy paper, or occasionally leather) with a sewn spine.
- Illuminated manuscript – a book in which the text is supplemented with such decoration as initials, borders (marginalia) and miniature illustrations
- Incunable – an early printed book (before 1501)
- Instant book – a book that has been produced and published very quickly to meet market demand
- Interactive children's book – a subset of children's books that require participation and interaction by the reader
- Large-print book – a book with large text for the visually impaired
- Limited edition book – book that is released in a limited quantity print run
- Liturgical book – a book published by the authority of a church, that contains the text and directions for the liturgy of its official religious services.
- Magazine – a collection of written articles published on a schedule
- Mapback – an early form of a paperback with a printed map on the back cover
- Midlist – a book that is not a bestseller, but has strong enough sales to justify its publication
- Miniature book – a very small book
- Miscellany – a collection of various pieces of writing by different authors
- Monograph – a book on a single subject or an aspect of a subject, usually by a single author
- Networked book or Open book – a book that is written, edited, and read in a networked environment (such as Wikipedia)
- Novelization – a book that adapts the story of a work created for another medium, such as a film, TV series, comic strip or video game
- Online book – a book that is only available to be read on the Internet
- Orihon – long rolls consisting of sheets of paper pasted together began to be folded alternately one way and the other to produce an effect like a concertina
- Out-of-print book – a book no longer being actively published
- Paperback – book characterized by a thick paper or paperboard cover, and often held together with glue rather than stitches or staples
  - Mass-market paperback – small, usually non-illustrated, inexpensive bookbinding format
  - Trade paperback – a higher-quality paperback book
- Personalized book – a book that has been customized for someone, containing personalized text, customized illustrations, or variables, based on the characteristics of that person
- Photobook – a book consisting mainly of photographs
- Picture book – a book that combines visual and written text and often aimed at children
- Pop-up book or Movable book – a three-dimensional book
- Punch out book – a book printed on stiff card or cardboard usually comprising several pages of perforated, colorfully printed figures or shapes
- Reference Book
  - Catalogue raisonné – annotated listing of all the known artworks by an artist either in a particular medium or all media
  - Encyclopedia – a type of reference work or compendium holding a comprehensive summary of information from either all branches of knowledge or a particular branch of knowledge
  - Herbal – a book containing the names and descriptions of plants
- Remaindered book –a liquidated book
- Samut khoi – a folding-book manuscript
- Scroll – a precursor to the book which is a roll of papyrus, parchment or paper containing writing
- Song book or Chansonnier – a book containing lyrics and notes for songs
  - Choirbook – a large format song book
  - Table-book – printed book which is arranged so that all the parts of a piece of music can be read from it while seated around a table
- Sticker album – a book in which a person sticks collectable stickers in designated sections
- Tankōbon – Japanese term for a book that is a stand-alone story and not part of a series
- Textbook – manual of instruction in any branch of study
- Tie-in – a book based on a media property such as a film, video game, television series, board game, web site, role-playing game or literary property that serve as cross-promotion
- Used book – a previously owned book
- Volume (bibliography) – a single book that is part of a larger collection
- Wallbook – large printed book that is designed also to be mounted on a wall
- Yearbook – a book that is published annually
- Information structure – also called information packaging, describes the way in which information is formally packaged within a sentence
  - Casebook – a special type of textbook used in law schools in the United States
  - Open textbook – a textbook licensed under an open copyright license, and made available online to be freely used
  - Problem book – a textbook, usually graduate level, organized as a series of problems and full solutions
  - Sourcebook – a collection of texts, often used in social sciences and humanities in the United States
  - Study guide – a textbook used to study for a topic, exam, etc.
  - Workbook – a type of textbook with practice problems, where answers can be written directly in the book

== Physical properties of a book ==
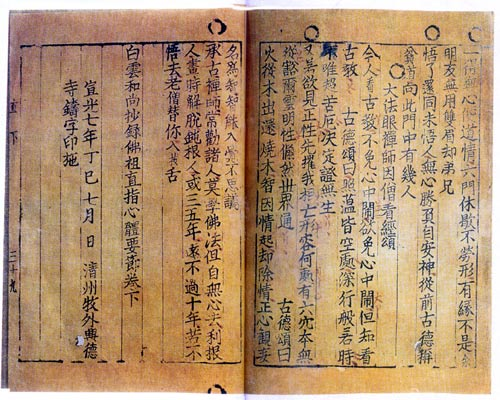
Korean book Jikji, Selected Teachings of Buddhist Sages and Seon Masters, 1377

- Book size – the dimensions of a book
- Leaf – a single sheet, the left-hand page of which is the verso, and right-hand page is the recto
  - Page – one side of a leaf of paper.
    - Title page, often with the imprint page on its verso.
    - Half-title
  - Ink – a type of pigment used to write letters upon the pages of a book
  - Paper – a material that easily absorbs ink, made from ground plant cellulose.
  - Parchment – a heavier alternative to paper, often made of reeds, cotton, or animal hide.
- Book cover – protective covering used to bind together the pages of a book.
  - Dust jacket – detachable outer cover, usually made of paper and printed with text and illustrations. This outer cover has folded flaps that hold it to the front and back book covers.

== Contents of a book ==
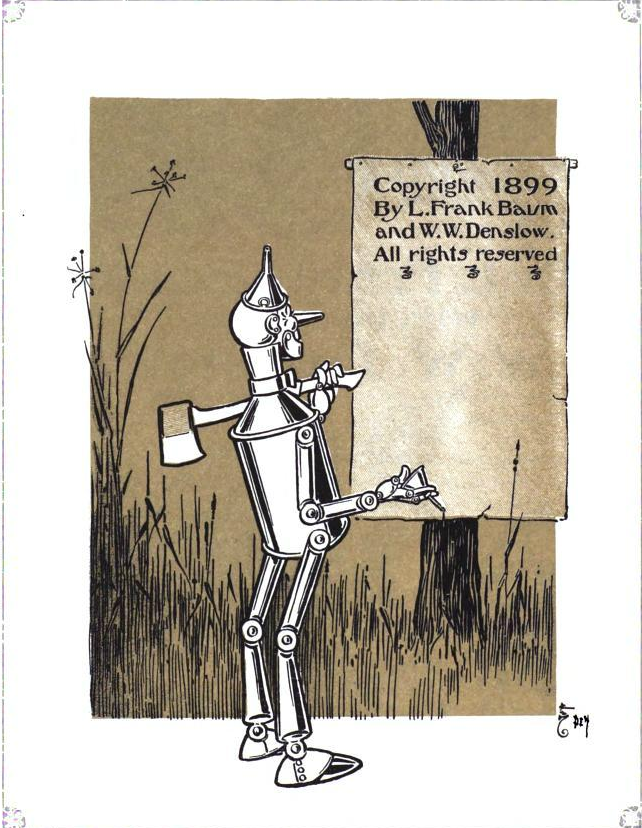
Copyright page of The Wonderful Wizard of Oz, 1899

=== Subject matter ===
- Literature (outline) – prose, written oral, including fiction and non-fiction, drama and poetry.
  - List of Literary or Writing Genres – writing genres are determined by narrative technique, tone, content, and sometimes length
    - Fiction (outline) – classification for any story or universe derived from imagination—and not based strictly on history or fact
      - Literary fiction (outline) – type of fiction that focuses more on analyzing the human condition than on plot
      - Genre fiction – plot-driven fictional works written with the intent of fitting into a specific literary genre
    - non-fiction – type of content whose creator (in good faith) assumes responsibility for the truth or accuracy of events, people, or information presented
      - Reference work – a book or periodical (or its electronic equivalent) to which one can refer for information.
      - Abstract – is a brief summary of a research article, thesis, review, conference proceeding, or any in-depth analysis of a particular subject and is often used to help the reader quickly ascertain the paper's purpose.
      - Outline (list) – called a hierarchical outline, is a list arranged to show hierarchical relationships and is a type of tree structure. An outline is used to present the main points (in sentences) or topics (terms) of a given subject.

=== Structure of book content ===
Book design – the common structural parts of a book include:

- Front cover: hardbound or softcover (paperback); the spine is the binding that joins the front and rear covers where the pages hinge.
- Front endpaper – the endpapers of a book are pages that consist of a double-size sheet folded, the front endpaper and the flyleaf.
- Flyleaf: The blank leaf or leaves following the front free endpaper.
- Front matter – the first section of a book
  - Frontispiece – a decorative illustration on the verso facing the title page
  - Title page – repeats the title and author as printed on the cover or spine.
  - Copyright page: – typically verso of title page: shows copyright owner/date, credits, edition/printing, cataloguing details
  - Table of contents – a list of the chapter headings and nested sub-headings with their respective page numbers
    - List of figures – often included in technical books, a list of drawings or depictions in the book
    - List of tables – often included in technical books, a list of data in rows and columns, or possibly in more complex structure.
  - Dedication – an inscription which is the expression of friendly connection or thanks by the author towards another person.
  - Acknowledgments – a place in the book where the author gives expression of gratitude for assistance in creating an original work. This may also be placed in Back Matter.
  - Foreword – a short piece of writing sometimes placed at the beginning of a book and typically written by someone other than the primary author.
  - Preface – a short introduction to a book written by the work's author. The preface usually describes how the book came into being and may contain thanks or acknowledgments.
  - Introduction – the beginning section that states the purpose and the goals of the book
- Body – the main text or contents of the book, the pages often collected or folded into signatures; the pages are usually numbered sequentially, and often divided into chapters. Chapters may also have titles, and in a few cases an epigraph or prefatory quotation.
- Back matter – also known as end matter is the final section of the book it can contain a number of items
  - Epilogue – a piece of writing at the end of the a book which brings closure to the work.
  - Afterword – a piece of writing covering the story of how the book came into being
  - Appendix – supplemental addition to the given work that details information found in the body
  - Glossary – a set of definitions of words important to the work.
  - Index – a list of terms and references used in the text often with page numbers to where the terms can be found in the work.
  - Notes – a list of author comments or citations of a reference work, these may also be found within the main text at the bottom of a page.
  - Bibliography – a list of the works consulted when writing the body
  - Colophon – a brief description with production notes relevant to the edition and may include a printer's mark or logotype.
- Flyleaf – The blank leaf or leaves (if any) preceding the back free endpaper.
- Rear endpaper – the endpapers of a book are pages that consist of a double-size sheet folded, the rear end or backend paper the first of which is a flyleaf.
- Back cover – the back cover of a book which usually contains biographical matter, a summary of the book as well as the ISBN and publisher's price for the book.
- topics – is the central participant or idea of a stretch of connected discourse or dialogue. The topic is what the discourse is about
- discourse – is a generalization of the notion of a conversation to any form of communication. Discourse is a major topic in social theory, with work spanning fields such as sociology, anthropology, continental philosophy, and discourse analysis.
- topic/theme – of a sentence is what is being talked about, and the comment (rheme or focus) is what is being said about the topic.
- Chapter (books) – is any of the main thematic divisions within a writing of relative length, such as a book of prose, poetry, or law. A book with chapters (not to be confused with the chapter book) may have multiple chapters that respectively comprise discrete topics or themes.
- Lesson
- Syllabus

== Study of books ==
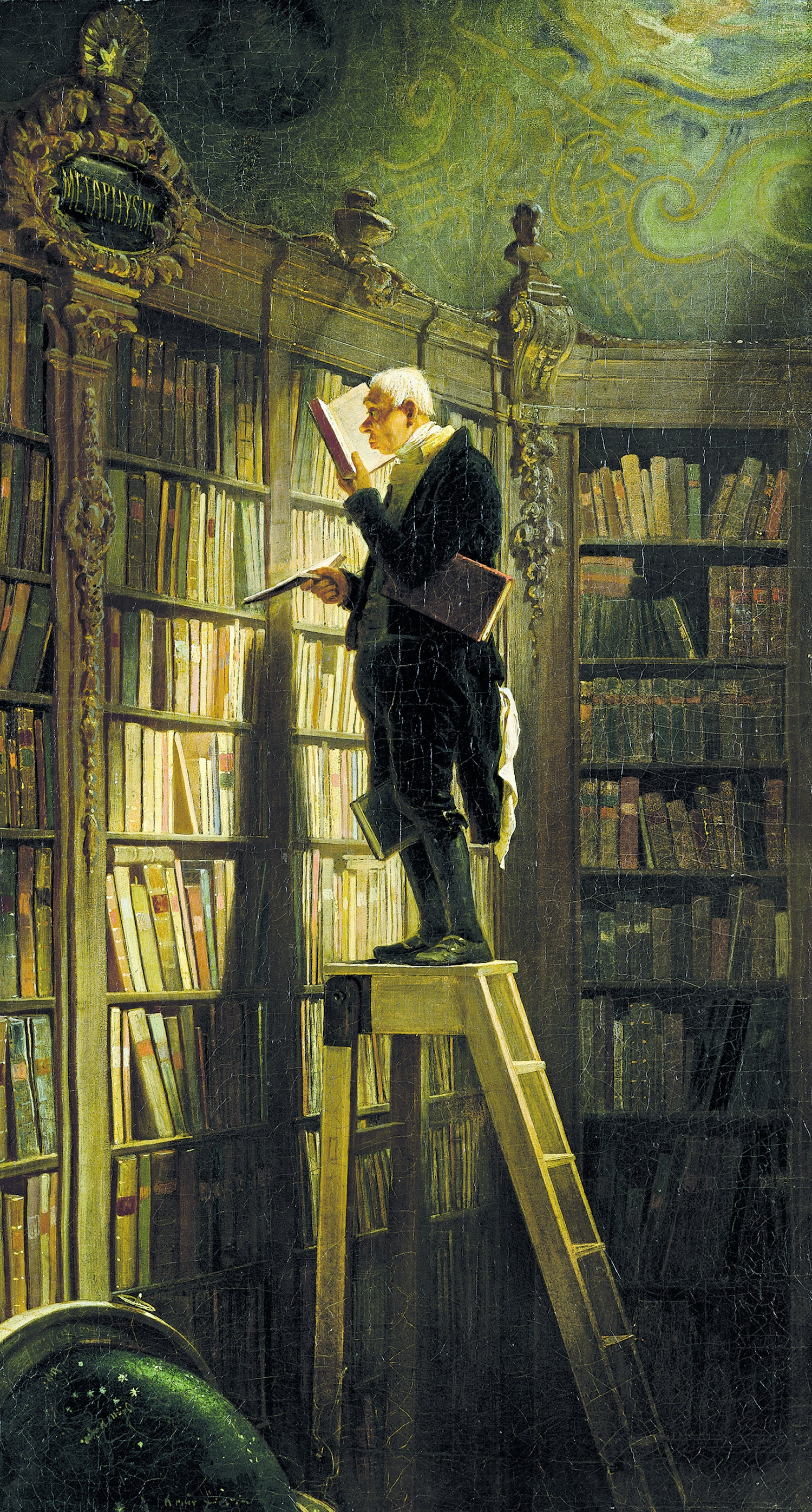
Carl Spitzweg 021

- Bibliography – the academic study of books as physical and cultural objects.
  - Enumerative bibliography – the organized listing of books
  - Descriptive bibliography – description of books as physical objects
  - Analytical bibliography – examination of the physical features of book as artifact
  - List of bibliographies – list of bibliographies on Wikipedia
- Literature – any single body of written works
- Media studies – the discipline and field of study dealing with content, history and effects of various media including print.

== Book collections ==
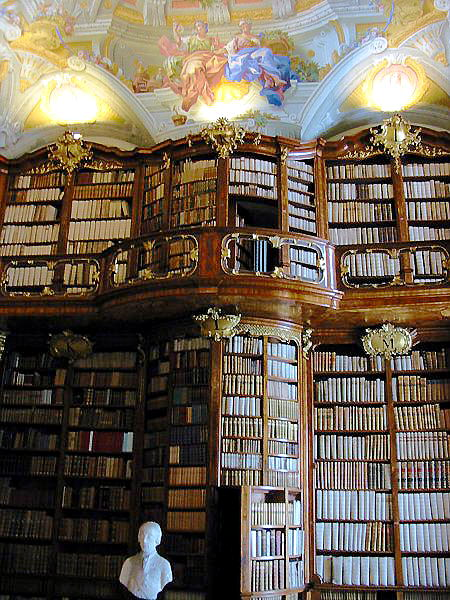
Bibliothek St. Florian

- Library – any single body of written works
  - Digital library – library that houses digital resources
  - Library science – field that applies the practices, perspectives, and tools of management, information technology, education and other areas to libraries.
  - List of libraries
    - List of libraries in the ancient world
    - List of national and state libraries
  - Private library – a library held by a private citizen
  - Public lending libraries – a library that provides service to the general public
  - Research library – a collection of materials on one more subjects
  - Special library – specialized library providing resources on a particular topic
    - Corporate library– specialized library serving staff at business or corporation
    - Federal Library – specialized library of a government
    - Law library – specialized library devoted to law
    - Medical library– specialized library focused on medical and health knowledge
    - Museum Library – specialized library within a museum
    - Music library– specialized library designed for the needs of musicians
    - News Library – specialized library of news articles and news-related items
    - Performing Arts Library – specialized library focusing on performing arts including music, theatre, dance, film and recorded sound
    - Presidential library – research library with the collection of a president's papers
    - Theological Library– specialized library devoted to the study of theology
    - Transportation Library– specialized library devoted to transportation

== Book identification and classification ==
=== Classification systems ===
- Bliss bibliographic classification (BC) – library classification system created by Henry E. Bliss and published in four volumes between 1940 and 1953.
- Chinese Library Classification (CLC) – national Chinese library classification system
- Colon Classification – library classification system mainly used in India
- Dewey Decimal Classification (DDC) – library classification system first published by Melvil Dewey in 1876
- Harvard-Yenching Classification – library classification system used for Chinese language materials in the United States.
- Library of Congress Classification (LCC) – library classification system developed by the Library of Congress and used by most research and academic libraries in the United States.
- Universal Decimal Classification (UDC) – international library classification system

== History of books ==
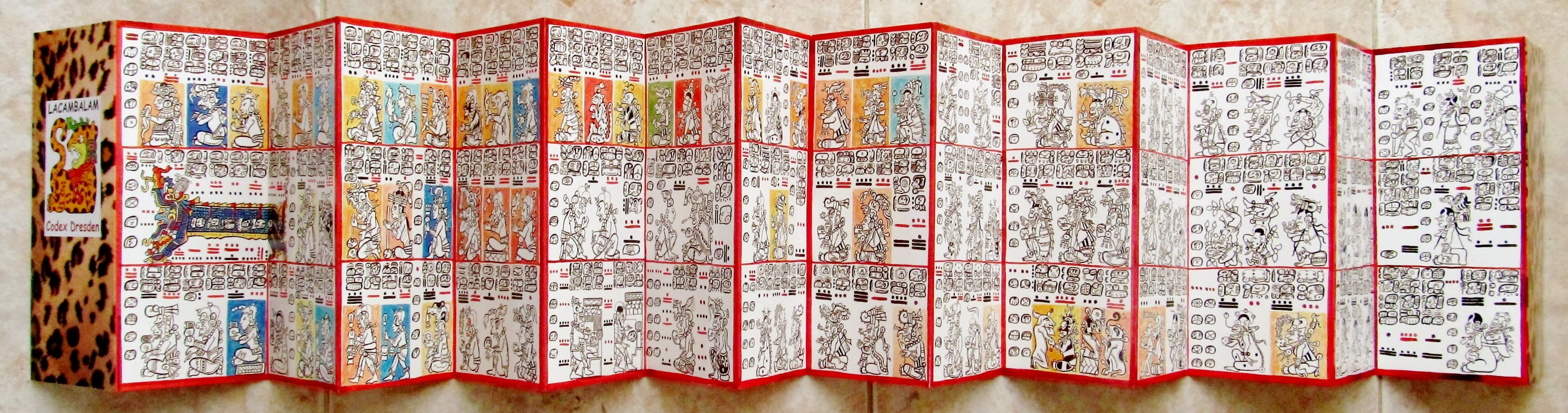
Códice Dresden en la edición de Lacambalam 2001

History of books

- History of writing – the development of expressing language by letters or other marks.
- History of scrolls – the history of a roll of papyrus, parchment or paper containing writing.
- History of the codex – the history of a book with handwritten content
  - List of codices – list of codices published from late antiquity through the Middle Ages.
  - Aztec codices – list of books written by pre-Columbian and colonial-era Aztecs.
  - Maya codices – the history of folding books written by pre-Columbian Mayans.
- History of printing – the history of the duplication of images
  - Woodblock printing (pre- 220 AD) – technique for printing text, images or patterns originating in China in antiquity.
  - Movable type (1040) – the system and technology of printing and typography using moveable components to reproduce elements of a document.
  - Printing press (1454) – a device for applying pressure to an inked surface resting on a print medium such as paper or cloth, and thereby transferring ink.
  - Etching (ca. 1500) – a method of printmaking using acid or mordant to cut into a metal surface to create a design in the metal.
  - Mezzotint (1642) – the system and technology of printing and typography using moveable components to reproduce elements of a document.
  - Aquatint (1768) – a variant of etching.
  - Lithography (1796) – method of printing using an image drawn with oil, fat or wax onto the surface of a lithographic limestone plate.
  - Chromolithography (1837) – a method for making multi-color prints.
  - Rotary press (1843) – a printing press in which images to be printed are curved around a cylinder.
  - Offset printing (1875) – a printing technique in which inked image is transferred from a plate to a rubber blanket and then to the printing surface.
  - Hectograph (19th century) – a printing process that involves transfer of an original to a pan of gelatin or gelatin pad pulled over a metal frame.
  - Hot metal typesetting (1886) –a typesetting method where molten-type metal is injected into a mold and the resulting slugs are used to press ink onto paper.
  - Screen printing (1907) – a printing technique where a mesh is used to transfer ink onto a substrate.
  - Digital press (1993) – method of printing from a digital-based image directly to a variety of media.

== Book production ==
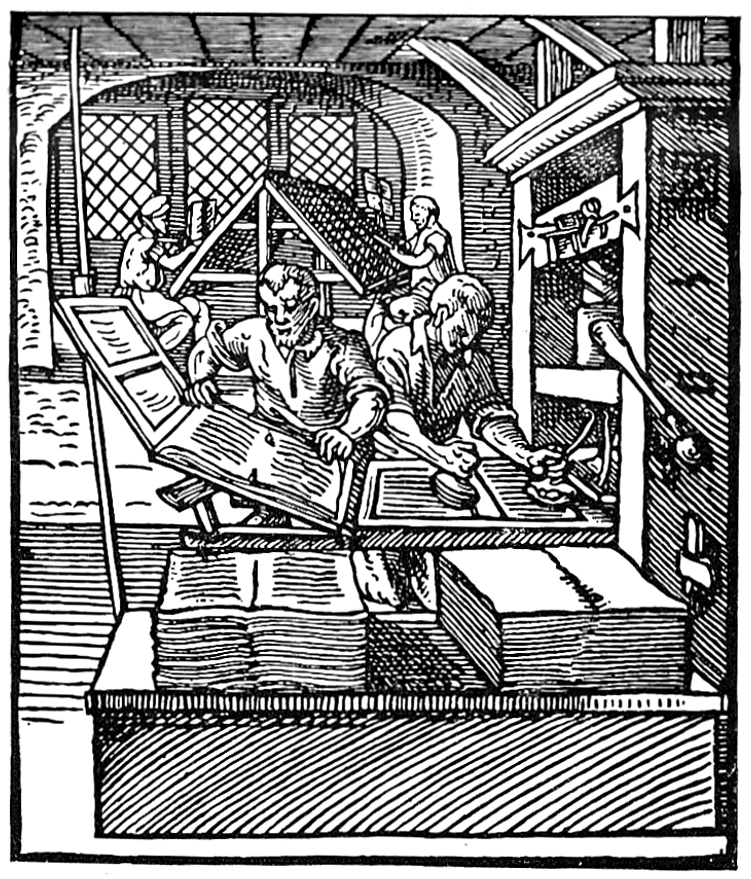
Buchdrucker, 1568

- Publishing – the dissemination of literature and making information available to the general public.
- Writing – a medium of human communication representing language and emotion.
  - Author – the creator or originator of written work.
- Editing – the process of selecting and preparing media used to convey information.
- Graphic Design – process of visual communication and problem-solving through the use of typography, photography, and illustration.
- Printing – process of reproducing text and images using a master form or template.
- Bookbinding – process of physically assembling a book of codex format from an ordered stack of paper sheets and bound together.
- content creation – is the act of producing and sharing information or media content for specific audiences, particularly in digital contexts.

== Book distribution ==
- Bookselling – the commercial trading of books
  - Book sales club – a subscription-based method of selling and purchasing books
  - List of bookstore chains – larger bookselling businesses, usually with multiple locations in a large geographic location
  - List of independent bookstores – small bookselling businesses, usually with one or a small number of locations in a limited geographic location
  - Lists of publishing companies
- Libraries – a collection of sources of information and similar resources
  - List of libraries

== Politics of books ==
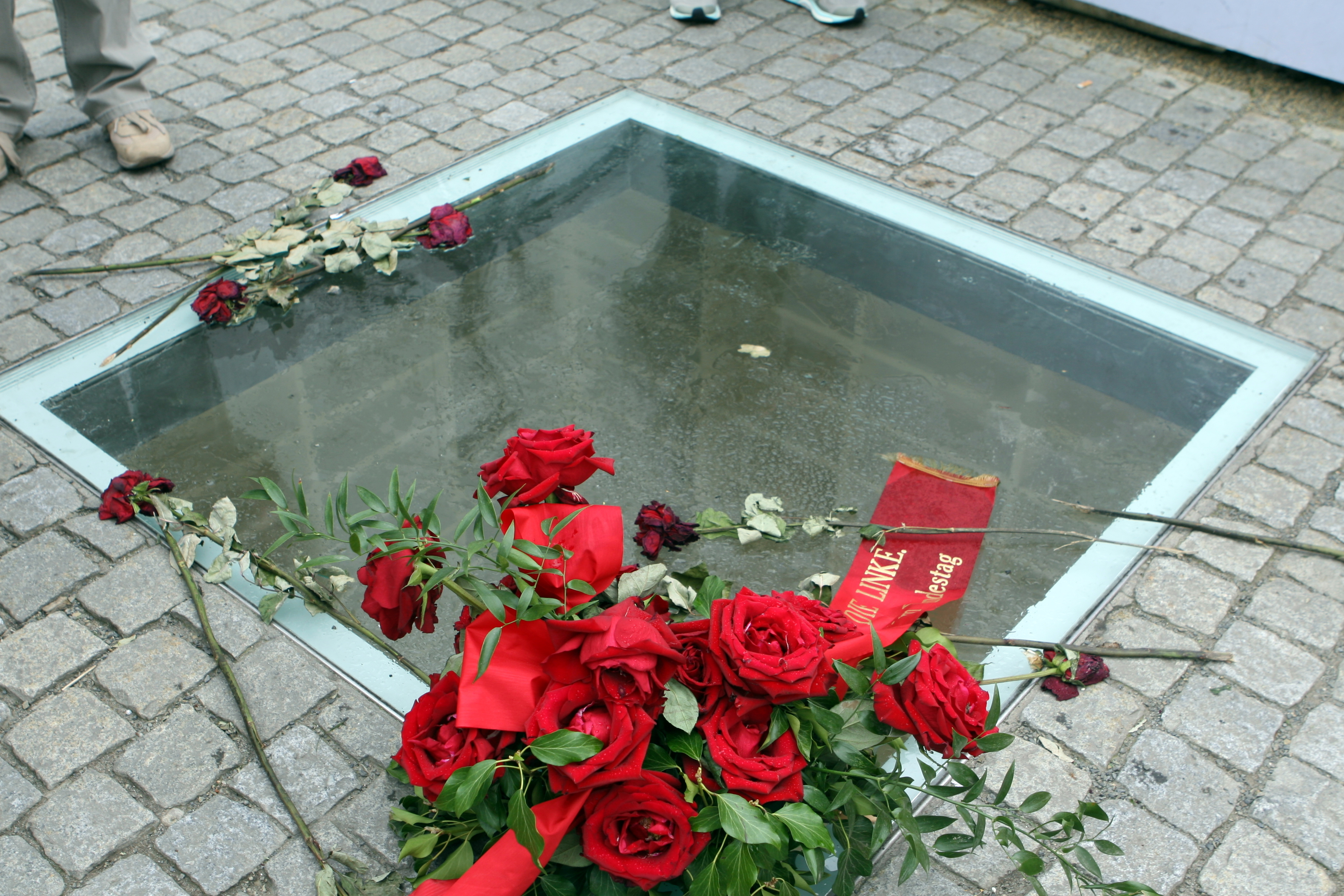
Memorial to the burning of books on the Bebelplatz in Berlin

- Book censorship – is when some authority, government or otherwise takes measures to prevent access to a book or to part of its contents.
  - Book burning – ritual destruction by fire of books and other written materials, usually carried out in a public context.
  - List of books banned by governments
  - Book censorship by country
    - Book censorship in Canada
    - Book censorship in China
    - Book censorship in Iran
    - Book censorship in the Republic of Ireland
    - Book censorship in the United States

== Book culture ==
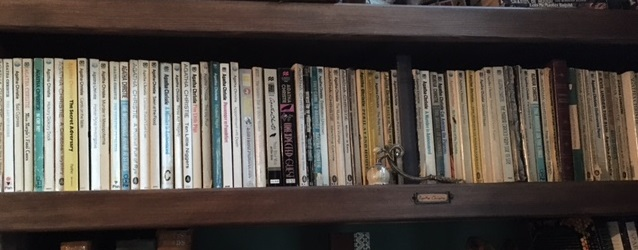
Agatha Christie collection

- Bibliophilia – the love of books and a bibliophile is an individual who loves and frequently reads books
- Book discussion club – a group of people who meet to discuss a book or books that they have read
- Book collecting – the collecting of books, including seeking, locating, acquiring, organizing, cataloging, displaying, storing and maintaining
- Book review – a form of literary criticism in which a book is analyzed based on content, style, and merit

== Countries and books ==
- History of the book in Brazil
- Book publishers in Upper Canada (1791–1841)
- Publishing industry in China (includes books)
- Books in France
- Books in Germany
- Book publishing in India
- Books in Italy
- Books and publishing in Pakistan
- Books in Spain
- Books in the United Kingdom
- Books in the United States

== Specific books ==
=== Books by title ===
Lists of books – list of book lists (bibliographies) on Wikipedia

- Lists of books by subject – book lists (bibliographies) by subject on Wikipedia
- Lists of books by writer – book lists (bibliographies) by writer on Wikipedia
- List of banned books – book lists (bibliographies) of banned books Wikipedia
- List of book titles taken from literature – list of books with a quotation from literature as the title for their works

== Book-related organizations ==
- List of booksellers' associations – a list of both booksellers' and Antiquarian booksellers' associations from around the world.

== Publications about books ==
New York Review of Books – an American magazine containing literary criticism, and discussions of the contents of various books.

== Persons influential in relation to books ==
- Johannes Gutenberg – inventor of movable type.
- Lord Stanhope – built a press out of cast iron, reducing force required by 90%, doubling the size of the printed area.

== See also ==
- Outline of knowledge
  - Outline of literature
  - Outline of library science
