= James M. Matarazzo =

American academic and librarian

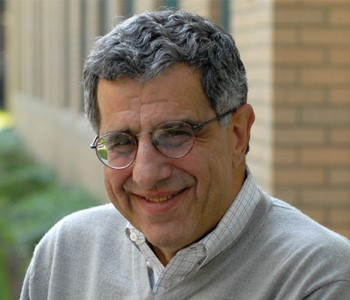
- Matarazzo at Simmons University
- Born: James Michael Matarazzo; January 4, 1941; Stoneham, Massachusetts
- Died: April 17, 2018 (aged 77); Boston, Massachusetts
- Citizenship: American
- Occupations: Dean, Professor, and Librarian
- Years active: 1965-2018
- Board member of: Special Libraries Association
- Spouse: Alice Marie Keohane (m. 1966; died 2022)

Academic background
- Education: BA, MA (Boston College); MS (Simmons University); PhD (Pittsburgh)
- Doctoral advisor: Thomas J. Galvin

Academic work
- Discipline: Library Science
- Sub-discipline: Special Libraries, Corporate Libraries
- Institutions: Massachusetts Institute of Technology; Simmons University

James M. Matarazzo (January 4, 1941 – April 17, 2018) was an American academic and librarian who taught at Simmons University for almost 50 years. He was a national and global leader in the field of special libraries.

== Education and academic career ==
Matarazzo held bachelor's and master's degrees in political science from Boston College, a master's in Library Science from Simmons College (now Simmons University) and a doctorate from the University of Pittsburgh. He first worked as a librarian at the Massachusetts Institute of Technology (1965-1969). From 1969 to 2002, he held a series of combined faculty and leadership positions at the Graduate School of Library and Information Science ("GSLIS") at Simmons College: instructor (1969–1970); assistant professor (1970–1973); associate professor (1974–1980); professor (1980-2002); associate dean (1974–1994); and dean of GSLIS (1994-2002). Upon retirement as dean, he was made dean and professor emeritus by the faculty. He continued to teach and publish until months before his death.

He was also Vice President and Board Secretary of the H.W. Wilson Foundation in New York. In July 2018, the board of directors of the H.W. Wilson Foundation endowed a graduate scholarship in his name tenable at Simmons University. A lifelong resident of Winthrop, Massachusetts, he served for many years on the board of trustees of the Winthrop Public Library.

== Awards and honors ==
Recognized as a global leader in the field of special libraries, Matarazzo was made a Fellow of the Special Libraries Association ("SLA") in 1988. He served on SLA's board of directors and on numerous committees. He was the recipient of the SLA Professional Award (1983 and 1992); SLA Hall of Fame (2015), and the John Cotton Dana Award (2016), its highest honor. Upon his death, SLA renamed a scholarship program in his memory as the "James M. Matarazzo Rising Star Awards" which are bestowed annually to recognize outstanding new SLA members who show exceptional promise of leadership and contribution to the association and profession.

He was elected a member of Beta Phi Mu, the International Library and Information Studies Honor Society, in 1991. He was president of the Association for Library and Information Science Education (ALISE) in 2000-2001.

He held visiting professorships at Texas Woman's University, University of North Carolina, Chapel Hill, University of Washington, University of Arizona, and Wayne State University. He was also visiting scholar at the Ernst & Young Center for Information Technology and Strategy.

== Important publications ==
- The Emerald Handbook on Modern Information Management, with Toby Pearlstein, eds., Bradford: Emerald Publishing, 2018.
- Special Libraries: A Survival Guide, with Toby Pearlstein, Santa Barbara, CA: Libraries Unlimited, 2013.
- Knowledge and Special Libraries, Series: Resources for the Knowledge-Based Economy, with Suzanne Connolly, 3rd ed., Oxford and New York: Routledge, 2011.
- The Value of Corporate Libraries, with Laurence Prusak, Washington, DC: Special Libraries Association, 1995.
- Information for Management: A Handbook, with Miriam A. Drake, eds., Washington, DC: Special Libraries Association, 1994.
- Information Management and Japanese Success, with Laurence Prusak, Washington, DC: Special Libraries Association, 1992.
- Corporate Library Excellence, Washington, DC: Special Libraries Association, 1990.
- President's Task Force on the Value of the Information Professional: Final Report, ed., Washington, DC: Special Libraries Association, 1987.
- Closing the Corporate Library, Washington, DC: Special Libraries Association, 1981.
- The Serials Librarian, ed., Boston: F.W. Faxon, 1975.
- Scientific, Technical and Engineering Societies Publications in Print, with James M. Kyed, eds., New Providence, NJ: Bowker, 1974–1981.
- Library Problems in Science and Technology, New Providence, NJ: Bowker, 1971.

Academic offices
Preceded by Robert Stueart	Dean of the Graduate School of Library and Information Science, Simmons College; 1994-2002	Succeeded by Michèle Valerie Cloonan
