= Military library =

A military library or base library, is a special library used by military personnel, their dependents, and civilian contractors located within or associated with a military base or defense organization. The primary duty of many military libraries is to assist with professional development, personal education, and leisure.

== History ==
Some of the earliest military libraries were originally funded by military personnel. It has been noted that in 1780, West Point had utilized officers' pay, one day's salary every month, to fund and purchase books to establish a library on base. Fifteen years later in 1795, the First Secretary of War, Henry Knox, laid the foundation for the War Department Library in Philadelphia.

=== Navy ===
In early 1800, President John Adams directed the Secretary of the Navy, Benjamin Stoddert to construct a naval library with materials that subject consisted of naval architecture, hydraulics, and various branches of mathematics that were used at sea. Navy libraries were not just limited to land as in the early 1820s a naval library was started on the USS Franklin, which was started with $800 and many donations from sailors. With this success, around a decade after the installation of the library on the USS Franklin, the Navy then required all ships to have libraries for technical books and materials, one library for the officers of the ship and one for the enlisted. Naval libraries continued to expand and at the end of World War I, with the assistance of the American Library Association, built an organized system of libraries. In 1919, the Library Services Branch was established by the Department of the Navy in order to manage a comprehensive library program, which is known today as the Naval General Library Program. By World War II, for both ashore and at sea there were over 1,500 various Navy libraries.

==== Marine Corps ====
A Library for the U.S. Marine Corps Headquarters was established in 1843. This library was created by Commandant Archibald Henderson and was authorized by the Secretary of Navy, David Henshaw. In 1919, the War Department had created Library Service Branch for not only the Navy but also the Marine Corps, which provided a professionally directed program. The Marine Corps University Library was later established as a part of the Marine Corps Research Center in 1993 as a way to support the Marine Corps University.

=== Army ===
The history of Military Libraries for the Army can be seen as early as 1821 in the General Regulations for the Army. In the regulations, money generated by post sutlers were able to be used to purchase books for a library. However, in 1857, Secretary of War Jefferson Davis had halted the use of sutlers funds for the support of these post libraries. This was short lived as a revision of the regulations allowed for the sutler funds to support the on-site libraries.

== Services ==
In the United States, military libraries often offer similar services to public libraries. They are often associated with a particular base, and their services are available only to the users of that base. Things like book borrowing, providing meeting spaces, computer access, and digital resources are all common services. Additionally, specialty material required of military members is often accessible in case the member does not have other access outside of their workplace. .MIL computers and computers with Common Access Card (CAC) card readers are some of these common services. Professional development and personal education are important features of military library services, with many libraries offering test preparation materials. The library and other education centers for the base may be combined.

Many base libraries provide leisure programming for all ages. Storytime, homework help, and group activities are all common programs.

Online services may be provided by the individual library or a larger organization. Military OneSource is a large provider of online resources that are available to many military-affiliated people. King's Bay Military Library is a joint venture of the Naval Submarine Base Kings Bay and Valdosta State University.

Overseas bases of the United States also have libraries. For Europe, United States Air Forces in Europe (USAFE) Libraries manages a network of libraries for Air Force bases. Those assigned to a USAFE base, or a Geographically Separated Unit (GSU) are allowed access to this network. USAFE Libraries also offers InterLibrary Loan (ILL) between their locations.

== Staffing ==
Depending on the responsibilities of the library, it may be staffed by civilian librarians, military personnel with library or organizational training, or both.

The Special Libraries Association (SLA) has a Military Libraries Community, that brings together librarians and paraprofessionals working at Military Libraries all over the world. The Military Libraries Community holds a biennial workshop and virtual tours of military libraries.

The American Library Association (ALA) has a Federal and Armed Forces Libraries Interest Group, which is a common forum and professional network for military library workers as well as librarians and paraprofessionals at civilian federal agencies. It is based within the ALA's Reference and User Services Association (RUSA).

== Military Libraries Week ==
A list of awards honoring military libraries and librarians was included in a press release from the Department of Defense during Military Libraries Week in 2024. These included the American Library Association Federal and Armed Forces Libraries Interest Group. The 2024 honor was awarded to Paula Laurita, U.S. Army Materiel Command Headquarters, Redstone Arsenal, Alabama.
