= NTCH Performing Arts Library =

Performing arts themed library in Taipei

Performing Arts Library (Taipei)
- 表演藝術圖書館
- 25°2′10.3″N 121°31′6.2″E
- Location: Zhongzheng District, Taipei, Taiwan
- Type: Special library
- Established: 1991

Collection
- Items collected: 190,000

Other information
- Website: https://npac-ntch.org/visits/library/space/

The NTCH Performing Arts Library (Chinese: 表演藝術圖書館; pinyin: BiaǒYǎnYìShù TúShuGuǎn) was established in 1993 in affiliation with the National Theater and Concert Hall (NTCH). It is a specialized library which collates items relevant to performances held at the NTCH, with over 190 thousand items in its collections. In addition to posters, program notes, and video/audio files related to the programs hosted by the NTCH, the library also possesses numerous books on the performing arts, music scores, and various periodicals, videos, and audio recordings of performing arts. Furthermore, the Performing Arts Library also has a special collections room featuring video and audio items including vinyl recordings donated by the family of the late music critic Mr. Tsao Yeong Kun in 2009. The total number of items in this collection is around 70 thousand. In addition to providing patrons with reading, watching, listening, and borrowing services, the Performing Arts Library regularly hold exhibitions and lectures on a variety of topics that promote the performing arts.
