= Joaquima Alemany i Roca =

Spanish politician (born 1942)

Senator in the Senate of Spain
- In office October 29, 1989 – March 13, 1993

Personal details
- Born: 19 May 1942 (age 84) Barcelona, Spain
- Party: Democratic Convergence of Catalonia

Joaquima Alemany i Roca (born May 19, 1942) is a Spanish lawyer and politician.

== Early life ==
Born on May 19, 1942, in Barcelona, Alemany i Roca is the child of Joan Alemany and Julia Roca. She was raised a Catholic and attended the University of Barcelona between 1960 and 1965, graduating with a degree in administrative law. She married Josep Ma. Sust, a businessman, in 1968 and the couple have three children: Josep Ma., J. Antoni and Mireia. She worked as a civil servant in the county government.

== Political career ==
Alemany i Roca joined the Democratic Convergence of Catalonia (CDC) in 1977. She was a councillor in the City Council of Barcelona between 1983 and 1987 and then a member of the Commission for the Advancement of Women between 1987 and 1989. She was an elected as a senator for Barcelona in the 1989 Spanish general election as a member of the Convergence and Union (CiU). She served until the 1993 Spanish general election and was spokesperson for the justice commission and the commission on the government and the interior. While serving in the senate, Alemany i Roca was the vice president of the Women's Institute of Catalonia and a member of the European Association for the Development and Training of Women.

She was elected to the Congress of Deputies and from 1997 to 1999, she was the first president of the Catalan Institute of Women. In the 1999 elections, she was elected as a deputy to the Parliament of Catalonia as a member of the CiU where she served until 2003. Alemany i Roca was honoured as a leading lady by the Liderman Cirt International in 1988 and with a golden madrone by the Casa de Madrid en Barcelona in 1990.

== Sources ==
- Dolling, Yolanda, ed. (1991). Who's Who of Women in World Politics. London: Bowker-Saur. ISBN 0-86291-627-5.
