= OPL =

OPL may stand for:

== Computing and technology ==
- Open Programming Language
- Optical path length
- Optimization Programming Language, a modelling language designed for the CPLEX Optimization software
- FM Operator Type-L, a series of sound chips made by Yamaha:
  - YM3526 (OPL)
  - YM3812 (OPL2)
  - YMF262 (OPL3)
  - YMF278 (OPL4)

== Libraries ==
- Oakville Public Library, in Oakville, Ontario
- Oshawa Public Library, in Oshawa, Ontario
- Ottawa Public Library, in Ottawa, Ontario
- One-person library
- Omaha Public Library, in Omaha, Nebraska
- Orem Public Library, in Orem, Utah

== Sports ==
- Oceanic Pro League, a former professional League of Legends league in Oceania
- Oman Professional League, an association football league in Oman
- Ontario Premier League, a Canadian association football league

== Other ==
- Luxembourg Philharmonic Orchestra, abbreviated to OPL
- On Patrol: Live, an American docuseries that uses the abbreviation OPL
- Optique & Précision de Levallois (1911-1964), a former French optical company
- Open Publication License, license predating Creative Commons licenses
- Operating lease
- Organisation du Peuple en Lutte ("Struggling People's Organization"), a Haitian political party
