= Guy St. Clair =

American educator and librarian

- Born: 1940 (age 85–86)
- Occupations: Educator, librarian, author
- Awards: John Cotton Dana Award (2019)
- Website: sps.columbia.edu/person/guy-st-clair

Guy St. Clair (born 1940) is an American educator, librarian, and author in the field of knowledge services and library management.

== Early life and education ==
St. Clair earned a Bachelor of Arts degree from the University of Virginia and a Master of Science degree from the University of Illinois Urbana-Champaign.

== Career ==
St. Clair began his career in library administration. He worked as the librarian and curator at the Union League Club of New York starting in 1969, and subsequently served as the library director at the University Club of New York from 1979 to 1986, before transitioning into consulting.

In 1984, St. Clair co-founded OPL Resources, Ltd., a consulting firm focused on one-person libraries and specialized information centers, with fellow librarian Andrew Berner. The firm later adopted the name SMR International, under which St. Clair serves as president and consulting specialist for knowledge services. He served as president of the Special Libraries Association (SLA) from 1991 to 1992.

St. Clair authored monographs on library management and knowledge strategy, including Managing the One-Person Library (1986), Customer Service in the Information Environment (1993), Entrepreneurial Librarianship (1995), Beyond Degrees (2003), and The Knowledge Services Handbook (2020), He serves as the series editor for Knowledge Services, a publication series by Verlag Walter de Gruyter, and has lectured on applied knowledge services at the Columbia University School of Professional Studies since 2010.

== Awards and honors ==
St. Clair was named a Fellow of the Special Libraries Association in 1996 and was inducted into the SLA Hall of Fame in 2010. He received the SLA John Cotton Dana Award in 2019 for his lifetime achievement and service to the library profession.

== Selected publications ==
- St. Clair, Guy; Williamson, Joan (1986). Managing the One-Person Library. London: Butterworths. ISBN 978-0-408-01511-0.
- A Venerable and Cherished Institution: The University Club of New York, 1865-1990 (New York, 1991)
- St. Clair, Guy (1993). Customer Service in the Information Environment. London: Bowker-Saur. ISBN 978-1-85739-004-9.
- St. Clair, Guy (1995). Entrepreneurial Librarianship: The Key to Effective Information Services. London: Bowker-Saur. ISBN 978-1-85739-014-8.
- St. Clair, Guy (2003). Beyond Degrees: Professional Learning for Knowledge Services. Munich: K. G. Saur Verlag. ISBN 978-3-598-24369-1.
- St. Clair, Guy (2009). SLA at 100: From "Putting Knowledge to Work" to Building the Knowledge Culture: A Centennial History of SLA (Special Libraries Association), 1909–2009. Alexandria, VA: Special Libraries Association. ISBN 978-0-87111-559-1.
- St. Clair, Guy (2016). Knowledge Services: A Strategic Framework for the 21st Century Organization. Berlin, Boston: De Gruyter Saur. ISBN 978-3-11-046552-5.
- St. Clair, Guy; Levy, Barrie (2020). The Knowledge Services Handbook: A Guide for the Knowledge Strategist. Berlin, Boston: De Gruyter. ISBN 978-3-11-063187-6.
