= One-person library =

A one-person library (OPL) is a library led by a single person or a single professional librarian without any professional library peers. These libraries represent the vast majority of libraries in the world. They may be found in public and governmental settings, in companies and any organisations, in academic and research and as private initiatives for many subjects. Very often they are specialized towards a specific subject of collection and thus part of the special libraries scene. In 1972 the U.S. Special Libraries Association (SLA) invited at their annual conference to a discussion on the issue of such a library type under the heading "The One Man Library" led by Guy St. Clair by then librarian at the University Club of New York of New York City. Thanks to the long time engagement and dedication of Guy St. Clair after the initial meeting, the One Person Library became a global movement proliferating to other countries throughout the world.

Guy St. Clair defined the one-person library as “one in which all the work is done by the [single] librarian” (1976). The SOLO Librarians Division of the Special Libraries Association defines a SOLO as “an isolated librarian or information collector/provider who has no professional peers within the immediate organization.” Other names for an OPL are solo librarian (in the U.S., the UK, and Israel), sole-charge librarian (in Australia and New Zealand), or one-man band (used by Aslib in the UK).

== Milestones in OPL history ==
1972 Guy St. Clair leads a discussion at the Special Libraries Association (SLA) Annual Conference in Boston, Massachusetts, on “The One-Man Library.” He said he would do so only if the title was changed to “The One-Person Library.” This is the first instance of the term OPL being used. Hundreds of OPLs attend the session, overflowing the room.

1984 St. Clair publishes The One-Person Library newsletter with Andrew Berner, also of the University Club of New York.

1986 The OPL Support Group is formed in Toronto, Ontario, Canada, by solos in the local chapter of SLA. This is the first known organization of OPLs.

Late 1980s Aslib forms the One-Man Bands group in the U.K.

1988 Martha (Marty) Rhine forms the SOLO Librarians Caucus of the SLA with an initial membership of about 100.

1991 The SOLO Librarians Caucus becomes a full-fledged division of SLA, with Judith Siess as the first chairperson.

1995 One-Person Australian Librarians (OPAL) was formed as a special-interest group of the Australian Library and Information Association (ALIA) after the Health, Law and Specials Conference in Sydney. Georgina Dale, Toni Silson (now Kennedy), and Therese Bendeich were its first leaders.

1996 The first German OPL roundtable was held, organized by Evelin Morgenstern of the Deutsches Bibliotheksinstitut (German Library Institute), Berlin, Germany. Morgenstern formed the Initiative for Continuing Education in Academic and Research-Oriented Special Libraries and Related Institutions" (Initiative Fortbildung für wissenschaftliche Spezialbibliotheken und verwandte Einrichtungen e. V.) when DBI disbanded.

1997 The SOLO Librarian’s Sourcebook, by Judith Siess, was published.

1997 First meeting of SLIM, Special Librarians (many of them OPLs), in the Midlands, was held in Birmingham, England; Chris Crabtree and Margaret Brittin were the founders.

1997 A One-Person Library Group formed as part of the Private Law Libraries Special Interest Group of the American Association of Law Libraries. (U.S.)

1997 In Germany, Verein der Diplom-Bibliothekare an wissenschaftlichen Bibliotheken (VdDB), later Berufsverband Information Bibliothek (BIB) formed a Commission for One-Person Librarians. Regina Peeters was the first chair until 2007.

1998 Judith Siess takes over as editor/publisher of The One-Person Library: A Newsletter for Librarians and Management.

1999 An electronic discussion list just for OPLs was established by the Library Association (LA) (UK).

2001 VoeB forms a Commission for OPLs and Special Libraries formed in Austria. Sonja Reisner was the first chair, followed by Heinrich Zukal in September.

2008 The One-Person Library: A Newsletter for Librarians and Management ceases publication with the retirement of Judith Siess, editor and publisher.

2018 The first elearning course of "Managing the One-person Library" in Persian presented by IPLF, and Judith Siess sent a special message for more than 5000 Iranian professional volunteers who started it.

== Resources ==
=== Books ===
- Bryant, Sue Lacey (1995). Personal Professional Development and the SOLO Librarian (Library Training Guides). London, UK: Library Association Publishing. ISBN 1-85604-141-7.
- St. Clair, Guy; Andrew Berner (1990). The Best of OPL: Five Years of The One-Person Library: A Newsletter for Librarians and Management. Washington, DC: Special Libraries Association. ISBN 0-87111-357-0.
- St. Clair, Guy; Andrew Berner (1996). The Best of OPL II: Five Years of The One-Person Library, 1989-1994. Washington, DC: Special Libraries Association. ISBN 0-87111-438-0.
- St. Clair, Guy; Joan Williamson (1986). Managing the One-Person Library. London and New Brunswick, NJ: Bowker-Saur. ISBN 0-685-39253-8.
- St. Clair, Guy; Joan Williamson (1992). Managing the New One-Person Library. New York, New York: Bowker-Saur. ISBN 0-86291-630-5.
- Siess, Judith A. (2005). The Essential OPL, 1998-2004: The Best of Seven Years of The One-Person Library: A Newsletter for Librarians and Management. Metuchen, New Jersey: Scarecrow Press. ISBN 0-8108-5429-5.
- Siess, Judith A. (2006). The New OPL Sourcebook: A Guide for Solo and Small Libraries. Medford, New Jersey: Information Today, Inc. ISBN 1-57387-241-5.
- Smallwood, Carol; Melissa J. Clapp (2012). How to thrive as a solo librarian. Lanham, MD: Scarecrow Press, Inc. ISBN 0810882140.
- Cooperman, Larry (2015). Managing the One-Person Library. Waltham, MA: Elsevier. ISBN 978-1-84334-671-5.

=== Articles ===
- St. Clair, Guy (1976). "The one-person library: An essay on essentials". Special Libraries. 67 (3): 233–238.
- St. Clair, Guy (1987). "The one-person library: An essay on essentials re-visited". Special Libraries. 78 (4): 263–270.
- St. Clair, Guy (January 1988). "Commitment, Courage and a Lot of Heart: Management Strategies for the Small Library". Bibliotheca Medica Canadiana. 9 (3).
- St. Clair, Guy (1991). "The One-Person/One-Professional Librarian in the Future". Future Competencies of the Information Professional. Washington, DC: Special Libraries Association.
- St. Clair, Guy (1993). Ann Lawes (ed.). "Management Concerns for the Minimal Staff Library". Management Skills for the Information Manager. Aldershot, UK: Ashgate.
- St. Clair, Guy (September 1994). "The One-Person Records Management Department: The Advantages Outweigh the Disadvantages". The Journal of the Records Management Society.
- St. Clair, Guy (1995). "The One-Person Library: Tasks and Management". SMR Special Report. 2–5. New York: SMR International.
- St. Clair, Guy (1995). "Finances and Value: How the One-Person Library is Paid For". SMR Special Report. 5. New York, New York: SMR International.
- Siess, Judith A. "Many articles". The One-Person Library: A Newsletter for Librarians and Management. Information Bridges International, Inc.
