= Information strategist =

An information strategist analyses the information flow within an organisation and directs its information resources to better serve the organisation's strategic goals.

They work with information technology or within a corporate library to direct high quality information from a variety of sources to users, based upon their profiles and needs. In warfare, information strategists not only seek to improve information flows for their own side but also try to disrupt the information flows of the enemy in order to demoralize and deceive them.
