= Corporate library =

Type of library

A corporate library is a special library serving the staff at a corporation. The information services provided by corporate libraries save employees time, and can aid in competitive intelligence work. An information strategist supports the work of an organization through the corporate library.

By offering a corporate library to employees, the corporation is able to encourage learning and give people opportunities for growth and development that may not be offered elsewhere. Corporate libraries also offer the opportunity for employees to share ideas in regards work related tasks or special projects needing to be completed.

Corporate libraries may act as an agent for fulfilling certain needs in the business, patent, personnel, and safety areas of the corporation. A corporate library may be structured as a vital service for research, providing necessary materials on business and marketing, management and personal development, and safety procedures. Corporate libraries may also help employees develop basic knowledge, provide reference for existing research, and prevent employees from wasting time on unproductive research. Also, corporate libraries may provide the corporation with books, periodicals, patents, articles, and general information services.

Corporate libraries were created in the early twentieth century, around the year 1900, as a response to a rapidly changing corporate and commercial environment. Two major developments of the corporate and commercial environment, research infrastructure and the scientific approach to management, were the main contributors that spurred the creation of corporate libraries. The rise of systematic industrial research and the management revolution, which accompanied the implementation of scientific management, benefited from corporate libraries who acted as adjuncts to those changes.

When corporate libraries first appeared in the early twentieth century, the names of those libraries may have differed from one corporation to another (alternatives names included Central Technical File, Information Bureau, and Intelligence Department). Those who worked in such organizations from the early twentieth century onward were not invariably called librarians. Professionals in such roles were referred to a wide variety of names such as systems librarian, technical services librarian, knowledge center manager, computer science librarian, information specialist, director of information strategy, and director of database research.

Information science was born from professionals within corporate libraries. Mortimer Taube and Brian Vickery are two corporate librarians who helped develop information science via academic writing and conference participation.

One major issue in corporate libraries relates to the difficulty of putting a dollar value on the intangible services the library provides to its parent company. The librarian at a corporate library should be prepared to justify the return on investment of an organization hosting such a library. In terms of size, they are seldom very large, and most library departments employ fewer than five full-time staff.
