= Special library =

Library providing resources on a particular topic or discipline

Auburn Avenue Research Library on African American Culture and History is a specialized research library in Atlanta, Georgia

A special library is a library that provides specialized information resources on a particular subject, serves a specialized and limited clientele, and delivers specialized services to that clientele. Special libraries include corporate libraries, government libraries, law libraries, medical libraries, museum libraries, military libraries, and news libraries. Special libraries also exist within academic institutions. These libraries are included as special libraries because they are often funded separately from the rest of the university and they serve a targeted group of users.

== Characteristics ==
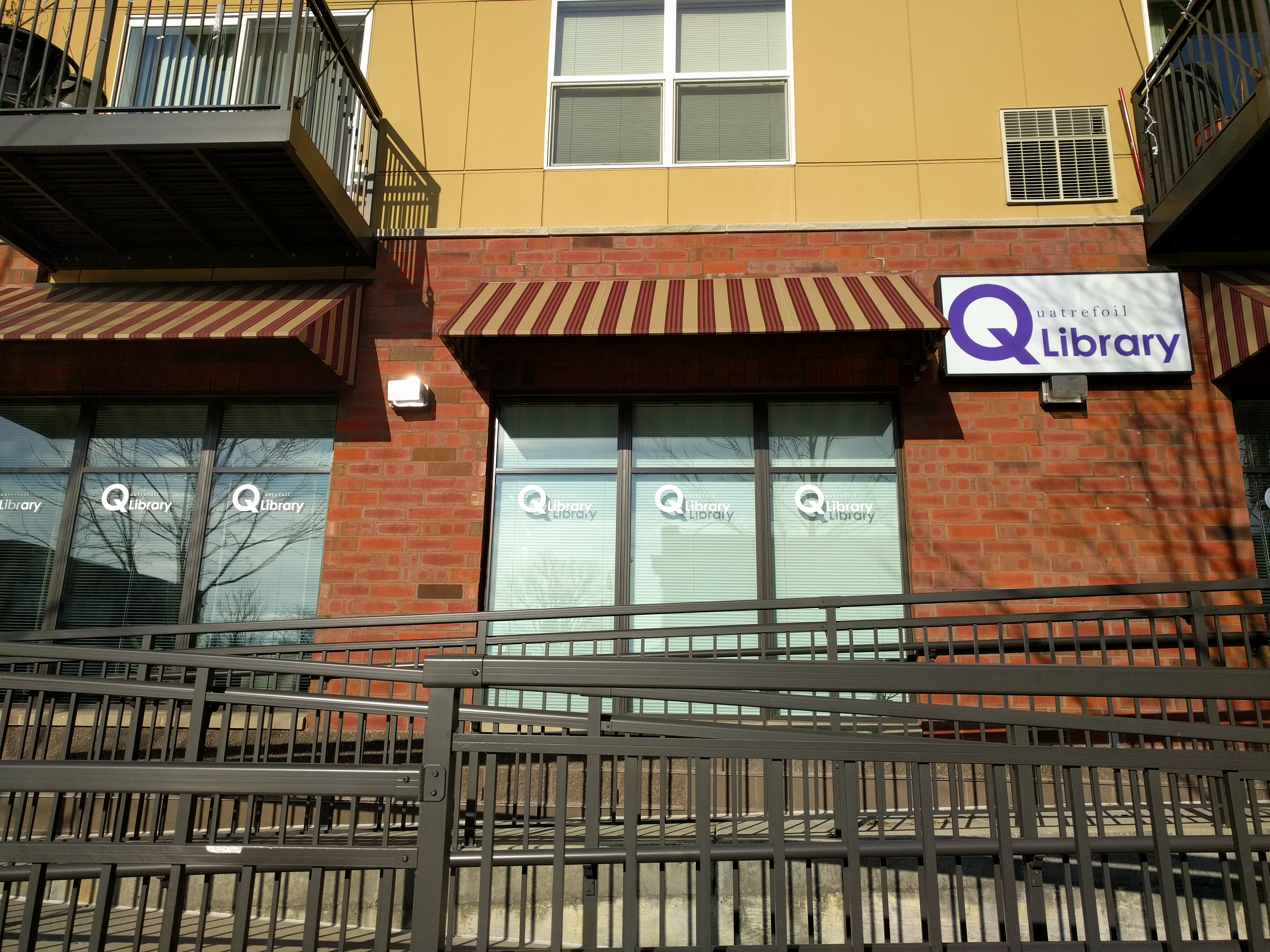
Quatrefoil Library is a member-supported library and community center for the LGBTQ community in Minneapolis, Minnesota

Special libraries often have a more specific clientele than libraries in traditional educational or public settings. They deal with more specialized, area-specific kinds of information. They are developed to support the mission of their sponsoring organization, and their collections and services are more targeted and specific to the needs of their clientele. Special libraries may or may not be open to the general public. Those that are open to the public may offer services similar to research, reference, public, academic, or children's libraries, often with restrictions such as only lending books to patients at a hospital or restricting the public from parts of a military collection. Many special libraries are not open to the general public, though access may be granted for specialized research by request. Special libraries are also sometimes known as information centers. Some authors differentiate special libraries from information centers by defining the latter as having "a very narrow scope". They are generally staffed by librarians, although many librarians employed in special libraries are specialists in the library's field rather than generally trained librarians, and they often are not required to have advanced degrees in specifically library-related field due to the specialized content and clientele of the library. Instead, they have training in the informational field and have research experience in that field rather than having typical librarian training. However, it is not uncommon for librarians at special libraries to have both a library science degree as well as a degree or experience of some type in the field their library specializes in as opposed to either only library science or field specific experience.

Special libraries are "special" in their collections, users, and services.

For example, a research institute's library may supply information to scientists who lack the time to visit the library. Current Awareness Service (CAS) and Selective Dissemination of Information (SDI) are very common. The listing of special libraries in this article is not comprehensive. Special libraries as a field are defined by not being public, school, academic, or national libraries. Special libraries may be called libraries, information centers, information resource collections, or other names, typically decided by the institution that the library is attached to, and they may or may not have a generally trained and qualified librarian on staff.

These libraries select and procure documents and other sources of relevant documents in the particular field and disseminate the updated information in the concerned field. They give pinpointed technical information promptly. Employees at special libraries provide desired information to users on demand and mostly in anticipation.

== History ==
The idea of "special libraries" in the context of sharing a collection of books to a targeted audience was by no means novel. The first known libraries, dating back to the beginning of known history, recorded commercial transactions and inventories. Today, these fall under the heading of corporate libraries, discussed below.

The concept of "special libraries" as a distinctive categories of libraries emerged in the United Kingdom and the United States in the nineteenth century. The growth of various special library associations led to the founding of the American Library Association (ALA) in 1876. The Medical Library Association was founded in 1898, followed by the American Association of Law Libraries (AALL) in 1906. The Special Libraries Association (SLA), which includes corporate libraries, was founded in 1909 with 20 librarians.

== Professional associations ==
The major professional association for special libraries is the Special Libraries Association, which has chapters in Canada, the US, and Europe. The UK based Chartered Institute of Library and Information Professionals and the Australian Library and Information Association also have focus groups devoted to special libraries. More special library associations around the world can be found in the list of library associations. There are also associations dedicated to supporting specialized libraries within specific fields. These include:

- American Association of Law Libraries
- American Theological Library Association
- Association of British Theological and Philosophical Libraries
- Indonesia Special Libraries Forum
- International Association of Aquatic and Marine Science Libraries and Information Centers (IAMSLIC)
- International Association of Music Libraries, Archives and Documentation Centres
- Medical Library Association
- Music Library Association

== Types ==
=== Corporate ===
A corporate library is a special library serving the staff at a corporation. The information services provided by corporate libraries save employees time, and can aid in competitive intelligence work.

=== Law ===
Law libraries are designed to assist law students, attorneys, judges and their law clerks, and other individuals conducting legal research including members of the general public. Most law libraries are attached to law schools, private law firms, or government courts for the use of the respective institution's clientele, though some university libraries also maintain a dedicated legal section. The collections of law libraries are tailored to the specific legal interests of the institution they are affiliated with and may not have extensive collection beyond that scope. Education requirement for law librarians varied on types of law libraries. Academic law librarians who provide reference would mostly likely have both master's degree in library science and Juris Doctor degree. Law firm librarians, in contrast, often have library science degree only. The dual-degree requirement in law librarianship has been widely debated in recent years, given librarians in medical or business libraries, for example, are not required to have advanced degree in subject disciplines. Legal reference services available to the general public are typically extremely limited due to legal restrictions on non-attorneys providing legal advice. Researching legal issues is acceptable but directly asking for legal advice is beyond the legally allowed assistance of a law library. The most a librarian at a law library can do is assist with locating reference materials but is not allowed to provide legal advice based on library materials.

Currently, the largest law library in the world is the Law Library of Congress in the United States of America. It opened in 1832 and became a department of the main Library of Congress with the first Law Librarian of Congress Charles Henry Wharton Meehan. Initially, the library only served the members of the United States Congress and the United States Supreme Court but has since expanded to serve the general public and various government agencies as well. The library's collection currently has approximately 2.65 million items in it including materials on both United States law as well as legal resources for jurisdictions all over the world. The collection also includes materials about the history of law going back to the beginning of the most primitive legal systems in the areas of common, religious, civil, customary, and socialist laws.

=== Federal ===
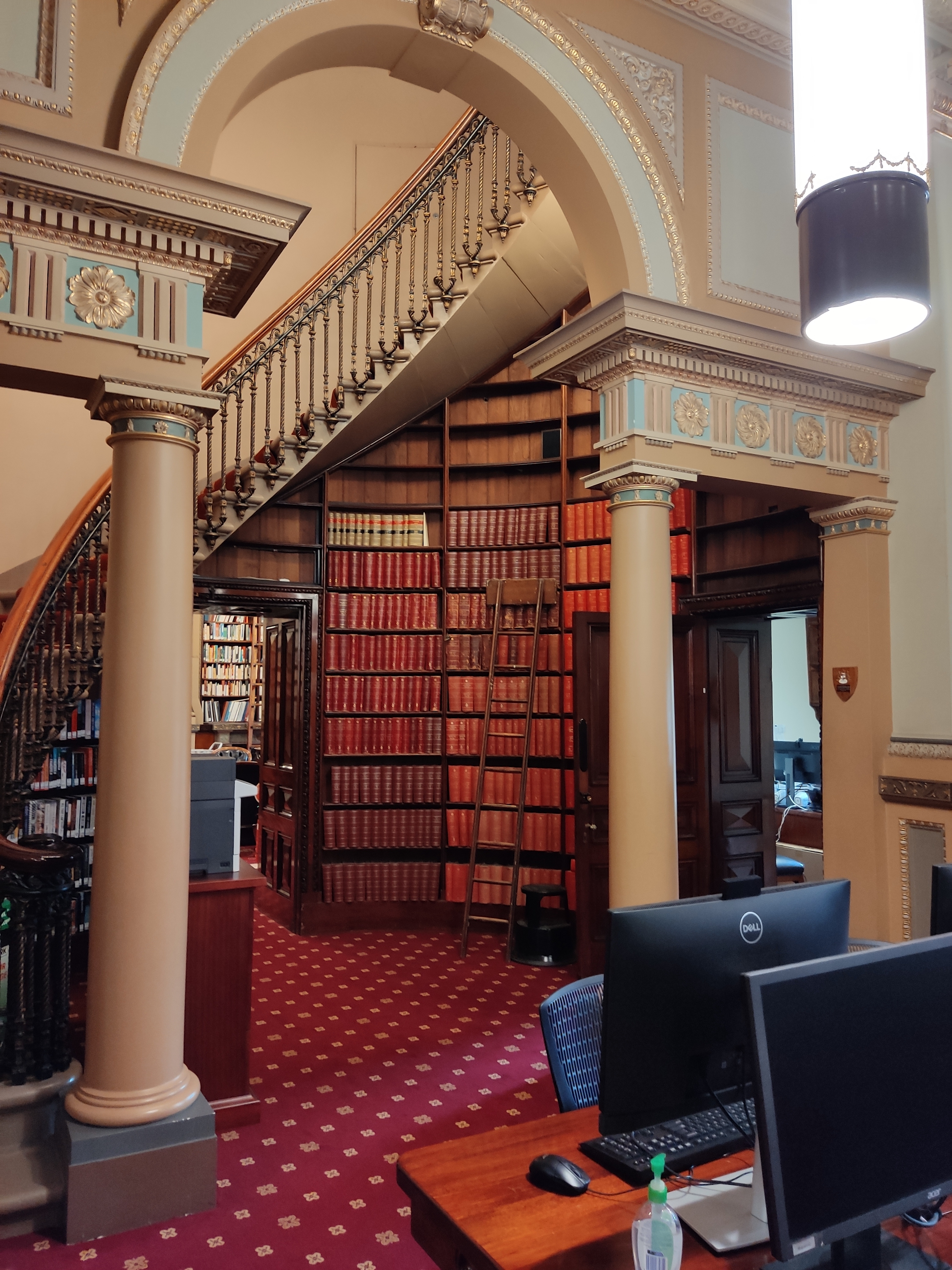
Interior of the Victorian Parliamentary Library in Parliament House, Melbourne

In the United States, federal libraries are libraries operated by a federal government agency. The most prominent example is the Library of Congress (LOC), the de facto national library, but there are "more than 1,100 libraries in the U.S. federal government."

The 2022 edition of the Federal Library Directory includes libraries operated by the Department of Agriculture, Department of Commerce, Department of Defense, Department of Energy, Department of Health and Human Services, Department of Homeland Security, Department of the Interior, Department of Justice, Department of Transportation, Department of Veterans Affairs, independent agencies, judicial branch, legislative branch, National Archives and Records Administration, and other agencies.

Major categories of U.S. federal libraries include military libraries and presidential libraries. Federal library workers are supported by professional organizations such as the Special Libraries Association (SLA), which has a Military Libraries Community, and the American Library Association (ALA), which has a Federal and Armed Forces Libraries Interest Group.

The LOC manages the Federal Library and Information Network (FEDLINK) as a consortium for U.S. federal government libraries, offering purchasing, training, and resource-sharing. FEDLINK's mission is to "achieve optimum use of the resources and facilities of federal libraries and information centers by promoting common services, coordinating and sharing available resources, and providing continuing professional education for federal library and information staff."

=== Medical ===
Medical libraries, also known as hospital libraries or health libraries, are designed to support the needs of physicians, health professionals, medical researchers, medical students, patients, and consumers interested in the medical field. Most medical libraries are attached to hospitals, medical research facilities, medical schools, and similar institutions. Whether medical librarians have degrees in a biological or medical field instead of or in addition to formal library training varies but is generally not considered essential. The specific nature of the medical library collection is tailored to the field or type of care that the library's institution specializes in.

Some hospitals also maintain a library specifically for the entertainment and leisure of patients rather than research, education, or professional development, and these libraries tend to function similarly to public libraries though their collections may be weighted towards medically related or themed works.

=== Physics ===
Physics libraries include books about physics or helpful to physicists.

=== Military ===
Military libraries are designed to support the needs of members of a nation's armed forces and other personnel attached to the unit or base that the library is a part of. The primary responsibilities of military libraries are assisting military personnel with access to resources for professional development, personal education, and leisure. Military libraries attached to military bases often include collections and services for families of personnel assigned to the base and may also maintain information on the history of the base, units assigned there, and notable personnel. Other military libraries are tasked with directly supporting military operations by providing access to pertinent resources or organizing and disseminating information directly related to a military unit or organization's activities. Depending on the specific responsibilities of the library, military libraries may be staffed by civilian librarians, military personnel with library or organizational training, or both.

=== Music ===
Music libraries are designed to support the needs of musicians and musicologists as well as broadcasting authorities, orchestral, opera and choral professionals, music publishers and suppliers, and music librarians. The primary responsibilities of music libraries are to collect musical scores, recordings of performances, critiques, commentary, and scholarship on the development of music as an art of both composition and performance. Music libraries document music as an art in all of its diversity of forms and genres. Music libraries contain musical scores, manuscripts, papers, and recordings. Music libraries exist in academic and cultural institutions as well as in companies in the business of music.

=== Transportation ===
Transportation libraries are designed to support the study, research, and dissemination of information related to transportation. They provide resources related to policy, regulations, operations, and other aspects of transportation. Users of transportation libraries include engineers, city planners, contractors, academic researchers, and the general public. Transportation libraries are located at the federal, state, and local levels of government, as well as at universities and research institutes. Major transportation libraries can be found in the United States, Canada, the United Kingdom, Sweden, Australia, and Japan.

=== Museum ===
Museum libraries are libraries within museums. Like any other special library, museum libraries have aspects of traditional libraries, but also contain other characteristics unlike public or academic libraries. Museum libraries are often associated with a public museum or institution whose main purpose is to provide historical and educational information to the general public. Unlike traditional libraries, many museum libraries are more private and hidden from the public eye due to their main purpose as a research library for museum staff and professional researchers. Because of this, users must often make appointments and be allowed special access through them by library staff or other museum staff. Though this is not to say all museum libraries are unattainable to public users. Museum libraries such as the Ryerson & Burnham Libraries of the Art Institute of Chicago, the Nolen Library of the Metropolitan Museum of Art of New York, and the Museums Victoria Library in Melbourne, Australia all provide access to public during opening hours.

Another major difference between this type of special library to other traditional libraries is that museum libraries are usually focused on one subject or field of study, rather than covering all subject areas. Such areas of study museum libraries focus in on include art, history, science, and other more specific fields. These areas the libraries focus on also depends on what museum they work and are associated with. The libraries within the MET and the Art Institute of Chicago, both art museums, focus on art and its history. While the National Museum of Natural History Library of Washington, D.C., focuses on natural history because of its collaboration with the museum which bears the same name. Museums and libraries collaborate and work with each other in order for both to function properly. Without one, the other could not survive.

Organizations that provide support to those working within museum libraries include Institute of Museum and Library Services and the Committee on Archives, Libraries and Museums, or CALM of the ALA.

=== Correctional institution ===
Correctional institution libraries, or prison libraries, serve a number of roles in a prison community. They provide a source of entertainment for the incarcerated, offer a place to research legal cases, and facilitate education. Because many inmates have low literacy levels, correctional institution libraries may offer tutoring services by civilian volunteers, teachers, or other inmates. Correctional institution libraries usually have one or two librarians and inmate workers, but there may also be a library technician or assistant. Correctional institution librarians can look to a few different organizations for assistance. The American Library Association and the Association of Specialized and Cooperative Library Agencies offer valuable resource for prison librarians.

=== News and hemeroteca ===
News libraries maintain collections of news articles and news-related items. Archives of newspapers, magazines, and other periodicals in print for consultation in public libraries may be called a "hemeroteca" in some European countries. The term also refers to an archive or a collection of newspapers, magazines, and other journalistic publications of a specific type such as document archives of publishers. The term is also used for archives of recent web-pages.

=== Performing arts ===
Performing arts library specialize in collecting items relating to any faction of the performing arts, including music, theatre, dance, film, and recorded sound. Generally, these libraries are open to the public, though patrons are only allowed to study these items within the library itself. The reason for this is because of how rare and fragile some of these resources are. This type of library is usually organized by divisions, each containing materials related to the aforementioned art forms such as photographs, programs, reviews, videotapes, newspaper articles, costume designs, posters, financial records, audio recordings (both music and non-music), sheet music, manuscripts, fine prints of portraits, and even printed materials like books and periodicals.

As libraries are adapting to the digital age, performance libraries are starting to include digital collection for patrons to get a small sample of what items are part of the library's physical collection, especially the more rare ones. The performing arts library is a vast and convenient resource of materials to be studied by students and professionals alike. One such example is the New York Public Library for the Performing Arts in New York City, not only because is it home to hundreds of thousands of rare materials, but also because of its location. The library is located at the Lincoln Center for the Performing Arts, right between the Metropolitan Opera House and the Vivian Beaumont Theater, and only a block away from the Juilliard School, making access for both students and professionals relatively easy.

=== Theological ===
Theological libraries provide many different types of resources to assist in educating and promoting the study of theology and religion. These libraries assist students, faculty, staff, and researchers through the use of primary and secondary sources to advance their knowledge of religion and theology to better understand its impact upon the world. Within the category of theological libraries, the variety of resources housed within each institution varies depending upon its needs and its researchers' needs. Some theological libraries are archival repositories for the historical collections of religious group(s) while other theological libraries specialize in more contemporary resources (books, videos, journals, etc.) to support theological and religious research. Because of the rarity of some of the archival collections and rare books housed within these repositories, the lending and use policies for each library varies greatly contingent on the type of institution where the library is housed.

There are a variety of institutions who are considered theological libraries. Some of these institutions include churches, seminaries, universities, colleges, and synagogues. A few of the most well-known theological libraries in the United States are found on the East coast. These theological libraries are mostly housed within a university or seminary because of the expense of maintaining the collections. Drew University in Madison, New Jersey, houses the archives and history center of the United Methodist Church. Along with the archives, about half of the 500,000 volumes in its library's collection are dedicated to theological and religious studies. The Jewish Theological Seminary Library in New York has a collection of 400,000 volumes dedicated to religious and theological studies along with an archive to preserve the papers of Jewish communities and famous people. Princeton Theological Seminary Library is another well-known theological library in the United States. The library's collection specializes in all areas of theological study with special collections in hymnology, Puritanism, early American pamphlets, and Baptist controversy. This institution is open to the public.

Most theological libraries are available for use not only by the students, faculty, and staff of an institution but also are open for use by researchers and the public. The archival collections housed within these repositories can assist in genealogical searches, understanding the history of a religious community, and more. There are also opportunities to obtain items through interlibrary loan if a patron is unable to travel to the library in person. Theological libraries are supported by the American Theological Library Association (ATLA) founded in 1946 and is headquartered in Chicago, Illinois. ATLA is governed by an elected board of directors and has as its members over 800 individual, institutions, and affiliates. The ATLA publishes four different journals monthly, annually, and quarterly. The organization also provides theological libraries with access to electronic resources (ATLA Religion Database, ATLA Serials, and ATLA Catholic Periodical and Literature Index) including an open access online journal the ATLA publishes. These print and electronic resources are subscribed to by thousands of institutions across the globe.

There are also well-known theological libraries located internationally. The International Theological Institute Library in Austria houses around 25,000 volumes in philosophy and theology. One of the most famous international theological libraries is the Vatican Library, founded in 1475, which contains not only collections on theology and religion but on history, law, philosophy, and science as well. Theological libraries are available around the world for a variety of research purposes. They contain both contemporary and historical collections to promote the understanding of religious communities.

== See also ==
- Guy St. Clair
- One-person library
- Association of UK Media Librarians

== Additional reading ==
- Cloonan, Michele V.; Berger, Sidney E. "The Continuing Development of Special Collections Librarianship", in: Library Trends. 52, no. 1, (2003): 9 ISSN 0024-2594
- Kruzas, Anthony, Thomas. (1965). Business and Industrial Libraries in the United States, 1820-1940. New York: Special Libraries Association.
- Scammell, Alison Handbook of Special Librarianship and Information Work. London: Aslib, ©1997. ISBN 0-85142-398-1
