= Discourse topic =

A discourse topic is the central participant or idea of a stretch of connected discourse or dialogue. The topic is what the discourse is about. The notion is often confused with the related notion of sentence-level topic/theme, which is frequently defined as "what the sentence is about". Discourse topics have been of considerable interest to linguists because of the relations between the topic of a discourse and various aspects of the grammatical structure of the sentence, including strategies for referent-tracking (including the use of voice, inversion, switch-reference markers, and obviation), topic-chaining, and pronominalization.
