= Book publishers in Upper Canada =

After the American Revolutionary War, U.S. printers were freed of British copyright restrictions and freely reprinted British works. Upper Canadian printers remained bound by British copyright. American presses quickly took the lead in producing cheap editions and eventually the printing of original work.

Publishing in Upper Canada was thus largely limited to local newspapers. The official Kings Printer published a large number of government documents, including the journal of the provincial Legislative Assembly and Legislative Council. During the 1830s, a series of directories and gazetteers were independently published. The only substantial original works published were by David Willson, the religious leader of the Children of Peace, a utopian Quaker group who built the Sharon Temple.

The following list is partial, and omits government publications.

== Dundas ==
=== George Heyworth Hackstaff ===
Newspaper	Dates	Political Orientation
Canada (later London) Inquirer	1839—	Reform

- Elam Stimson, "The cholera beacon, being a treatise on the epidemic cholera : as it appeared in Upper Canada, in 1832-4: with a plain and practical description of the first grade, or premonitory symptoms, and the various forms of attack, by which the disease may be detected in its curable stage : together with directions for successful treatment : designed for popular instruction" (Dundas: G.H. Hackstaff, 1835), 48 pp.
- Dr Thomas Rolph, "A Brief Account, Together with Observations, made during a visit in the West Indies, and a tour through the United States of America, in parts of the years 1832-3; Together with a statistical account of Upper Canada" (Dundas G. Heyworth Hackstaff, 1836), iv, 272, plus supplement.

== Kingston ==
=== James MacFarlane ===
Newspaper	Dates	Political Orientation
Kingston Chronicle	July 7, 1826 - June 23, 1832	Reform
Kingston Chronicle & Gazette, and weekly commercial advertiser	29 June 1833 – 31 December 1845	Reform

- "An apology for the Church of England in the Canadas : in answer to a letter to the Earl of Liverpool, relative to the rights of the Church of Scotland, &c. by a Protestant of the Church of Scotland" (Kingston: James MacFarlane, 1826), 22 pp.
- "The first report of the (revived) Kingston Auxiliary Bible society, with an appendix, 1830" (Kingston: James MacFarlane, 1831), 36 pp.
- Rev. William P. Macdonald, "Remarks on Doctor Strachan's pamphlet against the Catholic doctrine of the real presence of Christ's body and blood in the eucharist : addressed by him to his congregation of St. James' Church in York, Upper Canada" (Kingston: James MacFarlane, 1834), 72 pp.

=== Stephen Miles ===
Newspaper	Dates	Political Orientation
Kingston Gazette	NOV. 27, 1810 - DEC. 29, 1820	Reform

- Jonathan Simpson "Essay on modern reformers: addressed to the people of Upper Canada. To which is added, a letter to Mr. Robert Gourlay" (Kingston: Stephen Miles, 1818), 18 pp.

=== Hugh Christopher Thomson (1791-1834) ===
Newspaper	Dates	Political Orientation
Upper Canada Herald	1819—1833+	Independent

+ The Herald continued to be published by Thomson's wife Elizabeth until 1838, making her the first female newspaper publisher in the province.

- Julia Catherine Beckwith Hart "St. Ursula's convent, or, the Nun of Canada: Containing scenes from real life." in 2 vols. (Kingston: Hugh C. Thomson, 1824) 101 + 134 pp.

=== Edward John Barker ===
Newspaper	Dates	Political Orientation
The British Whig	Feb. 11, 1834 - January 26, 1836	Reform/Conservative

== Sandwich (Windsor) ==
=== James Cowan ===
Newspaper	Dates	Political Orientation
Canadian Emigrant and Western District Advertiser	Dec. 1831 to Sept. 1836	Reform/Conservative

=== Henry C. Grant ===
Newspaper	Dates	Political Orientation
Western Herald and Farmers' Magazine	Jan. 1838 to Oct. 1842	Reform/Conservative

== Toronto ==
=== William Joseph Coates (1805–1879) ===
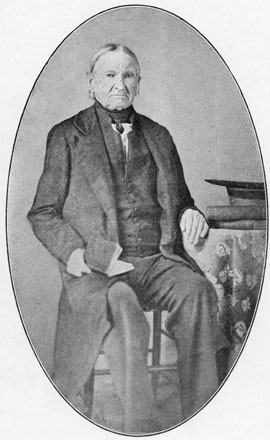
David Willson

Coates was the first printer of the Methodist newspaper "The Christian Guardian" edited by Rev. Egerton Ryerson from 1829–33, after which he opened his own shop.

- William Dunlop "An address delivered to the York Mechanics' institution, March, 1832" (Toronto: W.J. Coates, 1832), 16 pp.
- David Willson "Letters to the Jews" (Toronto: W.J. Coates, 1835), 71 pp.
- Adam Hood Burwell "Doctrine of the Holy Spirit: in its application to the wants and interests of corporate man under the providence and moral government of God, stated and defended from holy writ and the practice of the apostles of Our Lord and Savior Jesus Christ and in these days revived in Britain by Edward Irving, exhibiting the sole means of national reformation and preservation" (Toronto: W.J. Coates, 1835), 124 pp.
- David Willson "Moral and religious precepts, church ordinances, and the principles of civil government" (Toronto: W.J. Coates, 1836), 16 pp.
- David Willson "The Sinner's Friend, or Guide to Life" (Toronto, W.J. Coates, 1836), 8 pp.
- Samuel Hughes ("Remarks on Intemperance") (Toronto: W.J. Coates, 1836)! 40 pp.
- John McIntosh "The discovery of America by Christopher Columbus; and the Origin of the North American Indians" (Toronto: W.J. Coates, 1836), 149 pp.
- "Report of a committee of the Presbytery of Toronto, on the subject of a theological seminary" (Toronto, W.J. Coates, 1836), 8 pp.
- James George "Christ crucified: a sermon preached before the Presbytery of Toronto, on February 7, 1837" (Toronto, W.J. Coates, 1837), 27 pp.
- James George "The duties of subjects to their rulers with a special view to the present times" (Toronto, W.J. Coates, 1838), 32 pp.

=== W.J. Coates & Thomas Dalton (1782-1840) ===
- George Walton "The City of Toronto and the home district commercial directory and register with almanack and calendar for 1837 : being first after leap-year, and the eighth year of the reign of his majesty King William the Fourth" (Toronto: T. Dalton & W.J. Coates, 1837).

=== Thomas Dalton (1782-1840) ===
Newspaper	Dates	Political Orientation
Patriot & Farmers Monitor (Kingston)	Nov. 12 1829 —Dec. 7, 1832	Moderate Reform
Patriot & Farmers Monitor (Toronto)	Dec. 1832— 1840+	Conservative

+ The Herald continued to be published by Dalton's wife Sarah until 1848, making her the second female newspaper publisher in the province.

- George Walton "York commercial directory, street guide, and register, 1833-4 with almanack and calendar for 1834." (Toronto: T. Dalton, 1834).
- A Catholic Layman "Husenbeth's defence of the Catholic Church: a complete refutation of the calumnies contained in a work entitled The poor man's preservative against popery by the Reverend Joseph Blanco White with a preface by a Catholic layman of Upper Canada" (Toronto: T. Dalton, 1834), 88 pp.

=== Charles Fothergill (1782–1840) ===
- Charles Fothergill "Sketch of the present state of Canada" (York (Toronto): 1823), 194 pp.
- Charles Fothergill "Second address relative to the proposed lyceum of natural history and the fine arts in the city of Toronto, U.C." (Toronto: 1836), 2 pp.
- William Lyon Mackenzie (annotated by Charles Fothergill) "Mackenzie's own narrative of the late rebellion: with illustrations and notes, critical and explanatory: exhibiting the only true account of what took place at the memorable siege of Toronto, in the month of December, 1837" (Toronto: Palladium Office, 1838), 23 pp.
- Charles Fothergill "The Toronto almanac and royal calendar of Upper Canada for the year 1839: containing besides all the usual requisites for such a work, a general, historical, topographical, and statistical view of the province, and of its resources, natural and artificial; together with brief sketches of the sister colonies of British America" (Toronto: Published and sold at the Palladium Office, 1839) 224 + 77 pp.

=== Joseph H. Lawrence ===
- David Willson "The impressions of the mind: to which are added some remarks on church and state discipline, and the acting principles of life" (Toronto: J.H. Lawrence, 1835) 358 pp. + index. The remarks on church and state discipline (entitled " A friend to Britain") and "The acting principles of life" have separate title pages.
- P. Jones translator "The First Book of Moses, Called Genesis" (Toronto: J.H. Lawrence, 1835), 14 pp.
- Samuel Hughes A Vision Concerning the Desolation of Zion; or, The Fall of Religion Among the Quakers, set forth in a similitude or vision of the mind: particularly dedicated to the captives, or scattered tribes of that body, now commonly called Orthodox and Hicksites (J.H. Lawrence, Guardian Office, Toronto, 1835), 12 pp.
- Egerton Ryerson "Civil government - the late conspiracy: A discourse, delivered in Kingston, U.C. December 31, 1837" (Toronto: J.H. Lawrence, 1838), 20 pp.
- Egerton Ryerson "The clergy reserve question: as a matter of history, a question of law, a subject of legislation : in a series of letters to the Hon. W.H. Draper, M.P.P., member of the Executive Council, and Her Majesty's solicitor general of Upper Canada" (Toronto: J.H. Lawrence, 1839), 156 pp.

=== William Lyon Mackenzie (1795–1861) ===
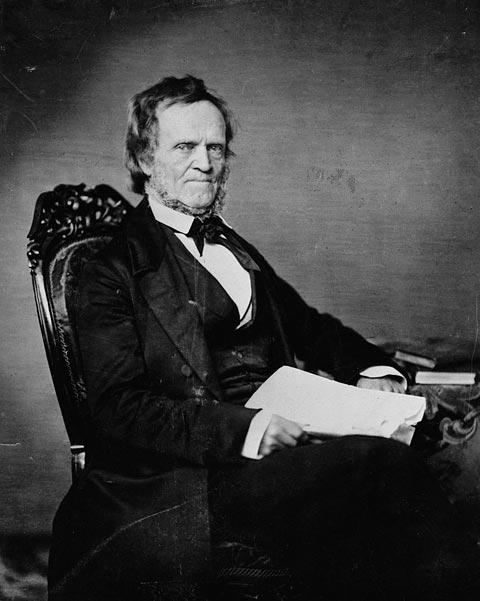
William Lyon Mackenzie

Newspaper	Dates	Political Orientation
Colonial Advocate	May 18, 1824 – 1833	Reform
Advocate	1833-Oct. 30, 1834	Radical Reform
Constitution	July 4, 1836-Dec. 6, 1837	Radical Reform

- William Lyon Mackenzie "Essay on canals and inland navigation, and the reports to the president directors of the Welland Canal Company, of Francis Hall, James Clowes, and Nathan Roberts, engineers, employed to survey a line of canal to connect Lake Erie and Ontario" (Queenston, U.C.: W.L Mackenzie, 1824), 16 pp.
- William Lyon Mackenzie The history of the destruction of the Colonial Advocate Press by officers of the provincial government of Upper Canada and law students of the Attorney & Solicitor General ... (York (Toronto): William Lyon Mackenzie, Colonial Advocate Press, 1827), 24 pp.
- William Custead "Catalogue of fruit & ornamental trees, flowering shrubs, garden seeds and green-house plants, bulbous roots & flower seeds, cultivated and for sale at the Toronto Nursery, Dundas Street, near York" (York (Toronto): William Lyon Mackenzie, Colonial Advocate Press, 1827), 18 pp.
- William Lyon Mackenzie "Some particulars, illustrative of the life and opinions of Andrew Jackson, the seventh president of the United States of America" (York (Toronto): William Lyon Mackenzie, Colonial Advocate Press, 1829), 36 pp.
- William Penn "Trial of William Penn, founder of Pennsylvania, at the Old Bailey, London, before the Lord mayor, recorder, and aldermen, Sept. 1670" (York (Toronto): William Lyon Mackenzie, Colonial Advocate Press, 1830), 14 pp.
- William Lyon Mackenzie Catechism of education: part first, various definitions of the term, education, qualities of mind, to the production of which education should be directed ... political education (York (Toronto): William Lyon Mackenzie, Colonial Advocate Press, 1833), 45 pp.
- "The productions of the evangelists and apostles: a faithful and true translation of the scriptures of the New Testament : with references, subdivisions and an appendix, containing notes to the preface and notes on the text; to which is added the Apocrypha" (Toronto: W. L. Mackenzie, 1837), 134 pp.

=== Robert Stanton (1794-1866) ===
- Robert Stanton (attributed), "A brief examination of a pamphlet, entitled, A letter to the Right Honorable the Earl of Liverpool, K.G. : first lord commissioner of the treasury, relative to the rights of the Church of Scotland, in British North America, from a Protestant of the Church of Scotland: its absurdities exposed, and its malice detected" (York (Toronto): Robert Stanton, 1826), 21 pp.
- Joseph Hudson, "A sermon on the death of His late Royal Highness the Duke of York, commander in chief of His Majesty's forces: preached in the Episcopal Church of York, Upper Canada, at the garrison service, on Sunday morning, March 11, 1827" (York (Toronto): Robert Stanton, 1827), 14 pp.
- Earl Bathurst, "Copy of the minutes of the intended arrangements between Earl Bathurst, His Majesty's Secretary of State, and the proposed Canada Company" (York (Toronto): Robert Stanton, 1828), 50 pp.
- James G. Chewett, "The Upper Canada almanac, and provincial calendar, for the year of Our Lord 1827: being the third after bissextile or leap year, and the eighth year of the reign of His Majesty [King G]eorge the Fourth ..." (York (Toronto): Robert Stanton, 1827), 76, ii pp.
- James G. Chewett, "The Upper Canada almanac and astronomical calendar for the year of Our Lord 1828: being bissextile or leap year and the ninth year of the reign of His Majesty King George the Fourth ..." (York (Toronto): Robert Stanton, 1828), 76, ii pp.
- James G. Chewett, "The Upper Canada almanac, and provincial calendar, for the year of Our Lord 1831: being the third after bissextile, or leap year, and the second year of the reign of His Majesty King William the Fourth ..." (York (Toronto): Robert Stanton, 1831), 103, ii pp.
- "A Form of prayer to be used on Wednesday, the 16th of May, 1832: being the day appointed by proclamation for a general fast and humiliation before Almighty God, to be observed in the most devout and solemn manner, by sending up our prayers and supplications to the Divine Majesty, for obtaining pardon of our sins, and for averting those heavy judgements which our manifold provocations have most justly deserved" (York (Toronto): Robert Stanton, 1832), 8 pp.
- Hugh Richardson, "York Harbour" (York (Toronto): Robert Stanton, 1833), 16 pp.
- W. Warren, "A Selection of psalms and hymns for every Sunday and principal festival throughout the year: for the user of congregations in the Diocess of Quebec" (Toronto: R. Stanton, 1835), 143, iv pp.
- John Strachan, "The Church of the redeemed: a sermon preached on Wednesday, 5th October, 1836, at a meeting of the clergy of the established church of Upper Canada, under their archdeacons assembled" (Toronto: R. Stanton, 1836), 60 pp.
- John Beverley Robinson, "Charge of the Honorable John B. Robinson, chief justice of Upper Canada to the Grand Jury at Toronto: (Thursday, 8th March, 1838) on opening the court appointed by special commission to try prisoners in custody on charges of treason" (Toronto: R. Stanton, 1838), 21 pp.
- Lindley Murray "The English reader: or Pieces in prose and verse, selected from the best writers" (Toronto: R. Stanton, 1838), 250 pp.
- John George Lambton, Earl of Durham, "Report, on the affairs of British North America, from the Earl of Durham, Her Majesty's High Commissioner, &c. &c. &c" (Toronto: R. Stanton, 1839), 142, iv pp.
- J. Stinson, M. Ritchey, "Plain statement of facts connected with the union and separation of the British and Canadian Conferences" (Toronto: R. Stanton, 1840), 56 pp.
- "Correspondence, addresses, &c., connected with the subscriptions of various Indian tribes in Upper Canada, in aid of the funds for the re-construction of Brock's monument, on Queenston Heights" (Toronto: R. Stanton, 1841), 32 pp.
