= Transportation library =

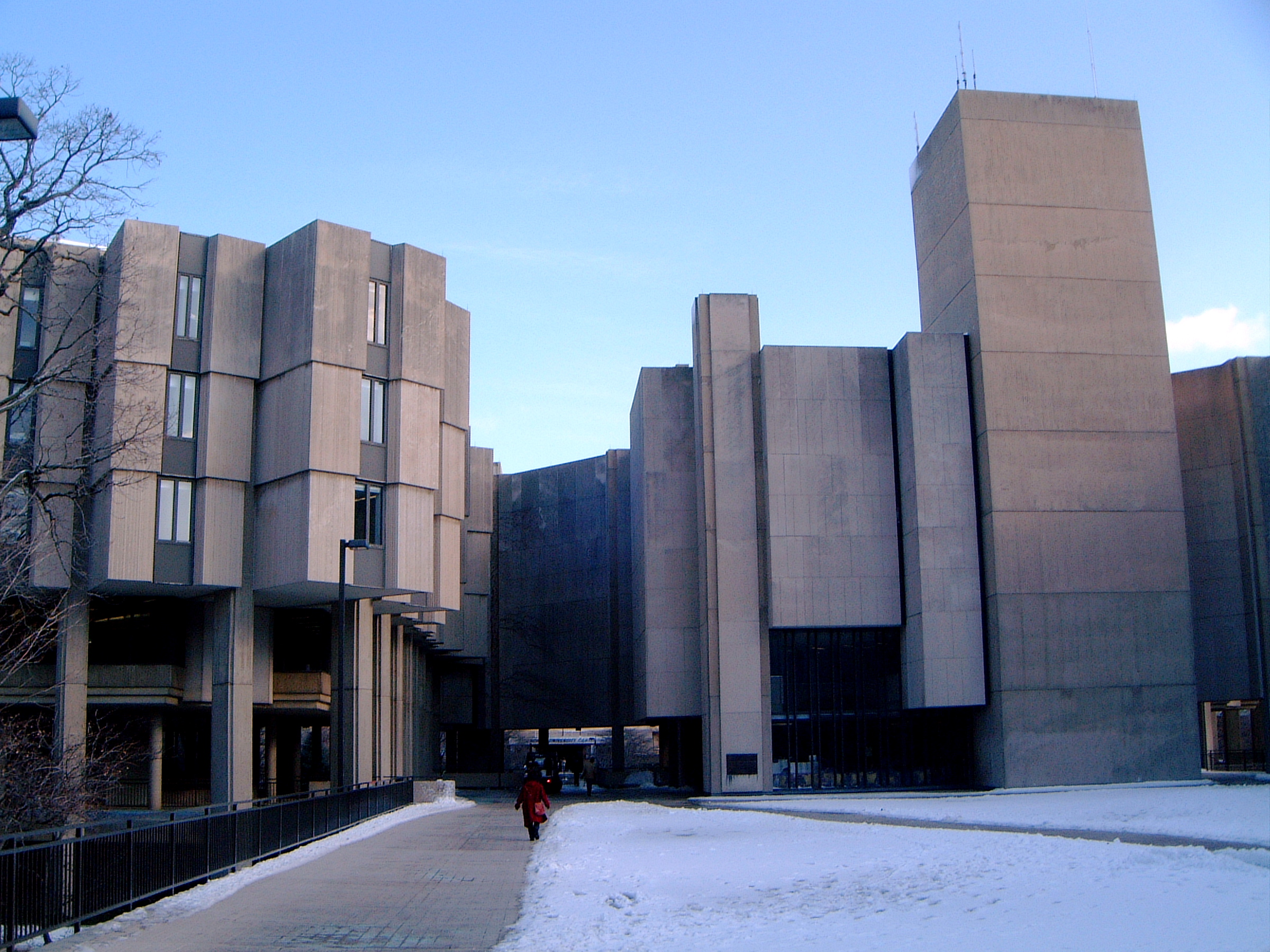
Northwestern University Transportation Library, a component of the Northwestern University Library, pictured at left

A transportation library is a type of library designed to support the study, research, and dissemination of information related to transportation. A transportation library provides resources related to policy, regulations, operations, and other aspects of transportation. Users of transportation libraries include engineers, city planners, contractors, academic researchers, and the general public. Transportation libraries are located at the federal, state, and local levels of government, as well as at universities and research institutes. Major transportation libraries can be found in the United States, Canada, the United Kingdom, Sweden, Australia, and Japan.

== See also ==
- Special library
- Medical library
- Law library
- List of transportation and logistics journals
