= Bowker-Saur =

Bowker-Saur was a publisher and former operating company owned by Reed Elsevier plc.

Bowker-Saur served business and library markets in Europe, Middle East, and Africa with book, journal, directory, and online database products. The company had its own publishing programme and marketed the products of its sister companies Bowker of the United States and K G Saur in Germany. Bowker-Saur was based in East Grinstead, West Sussex, UK.

Bowker-Saur was merged with Reed Reference Publishing, another Reed Elsevier company, in the late 1990s. Reed Reference Publishing was itself later merged with Reed Business Information. Bowker-Saur and R. R. Bowker were acquired by Cambridge Information Group in 2001.
