= Special Libraries Association =

Professional association

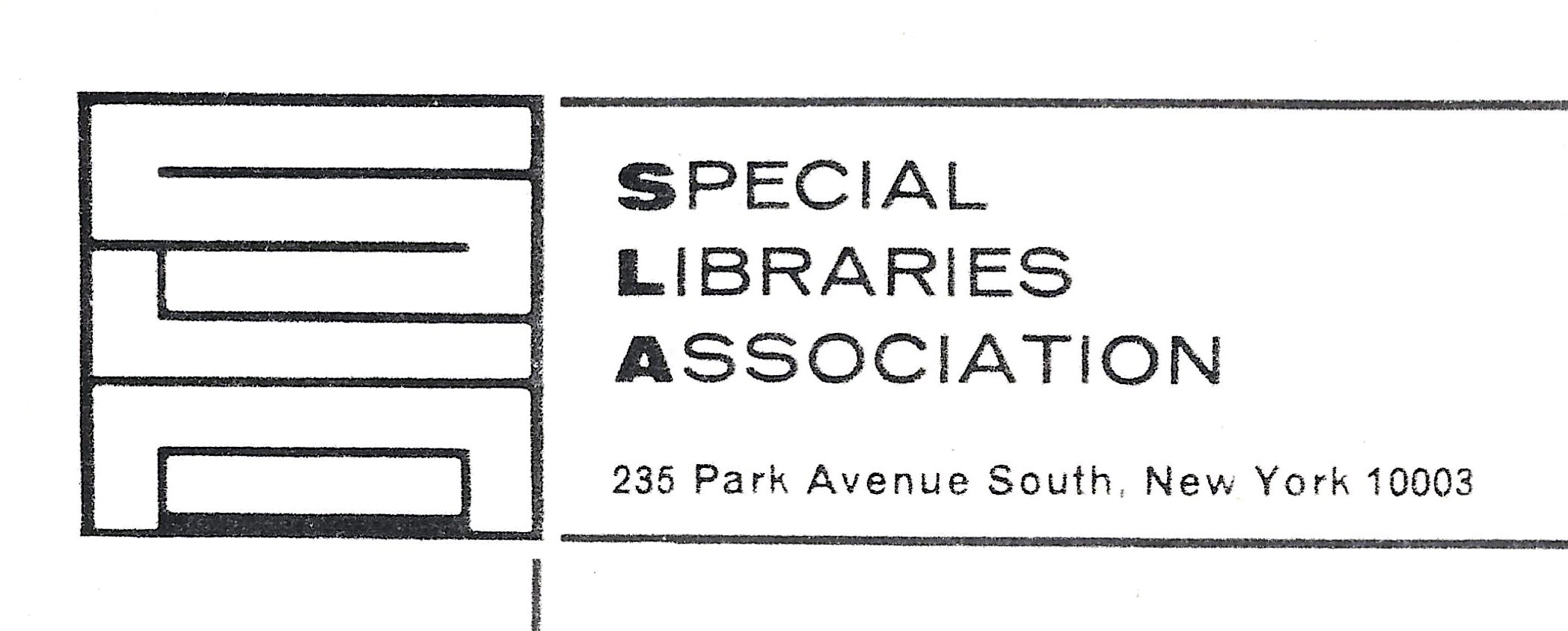
- Letterhead logo, 1970s

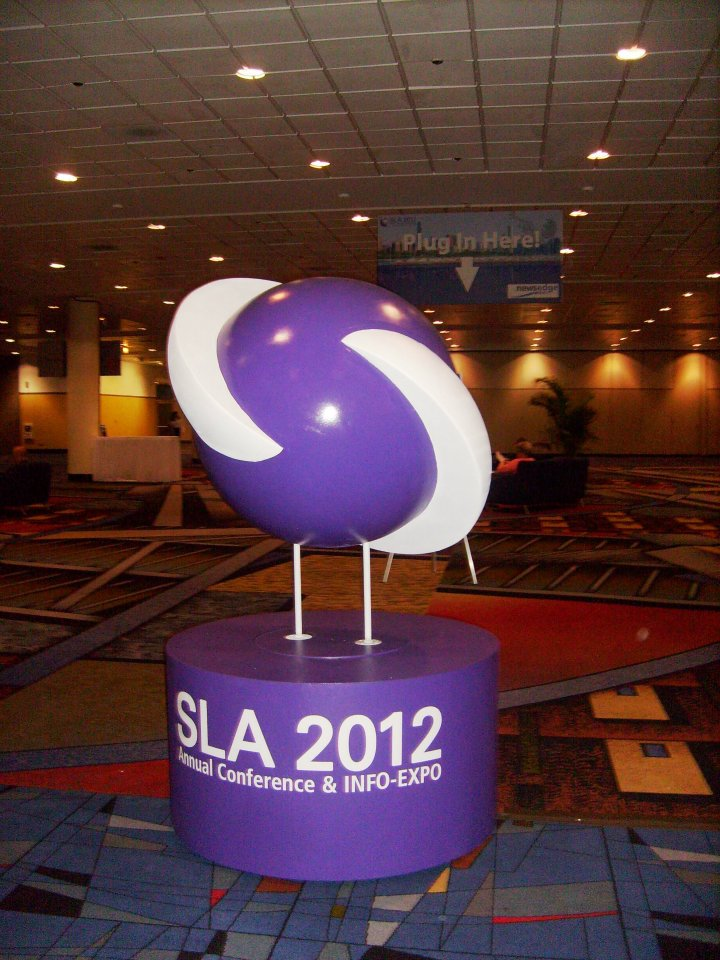
- Logo and conference sign, 2012
- Merged into: Association for Information Science and Technology (ASIS&T)
- Formation: 1909
- Headquarters: New York City; Alexandria, Virginia; McLean, Virginia, U.S.
- Members: around 14,400 (1997)
- Website: www.sla.org

The Special Libraries Association (SLA) was a United States-based international professional association for librarians and information professionals working in business, government, law, finance, technology, military, non-profit, academic, or other special libraries. Created in 1909, the association sought to band together those whose positions entailed performing a range of services and employing a diverse mix of skills related to, but not exclusive of, library science, often in environments where their budget is smaller, their target audience more restricted, their collection much more limited in scope, and few if any colleagues with library backgrounds. The association was organized into subject-related divisions, geographic chapters, special interest caucuses, and student groups. Association activities included conferences, professional education, networking, and advocacy.

In March 2025, the association announced dissolution plans, with an aim to finish the process by April 2026; the reasons given were the lack of funds to meet financial obligations and its inability to reverse a declining membership, together with unexpected expenses, all in a world in which the future of libraries and their professional associations was quite uncertain. Then in May it was announced that SLA had entered merger negotiations with the Association for Information Science and Technology. In August, the membership of both associations voted to proceed with the merger, which was completed by March 2026.

== History ==
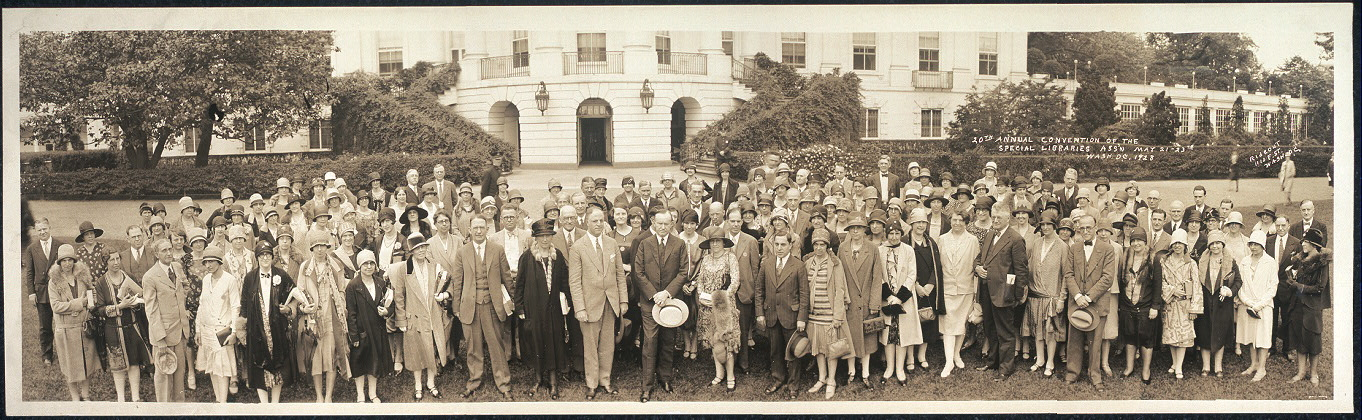
20th annual convention of the Special Libraries Ass'n, May 21–23rd, 1928, on the South Lawn of the White House with President Calvin Coolidge present

The Special Libraries Association was founded in 1909 in the United States by a group of librarians working in specialized settings, led by John Cotton Dana, who served as the first president of SLA from 1909 to 1911. In the years prior to SLA's founding Dana and other librarians saw an increasing demand for the types of materials that specialized libraries could provide, and recognized that as information professionals working in such settings responded to the demands of their jobs they were creating a new kind of librarianship. Also, many of them were working as professional librarians but largely without the professional support enjoyed by other librarians and professionals. The group sought to address their common problems by banding together. Their goal, as stated in the first issue of Special Libraries, was to "unite in co-operation all small libraries throughout the country; financial, commercial, scientific, industrial; and special departments of state, college and general libraries; and, in fact, all libraries devoted to special purposes and serving a limited clientage."

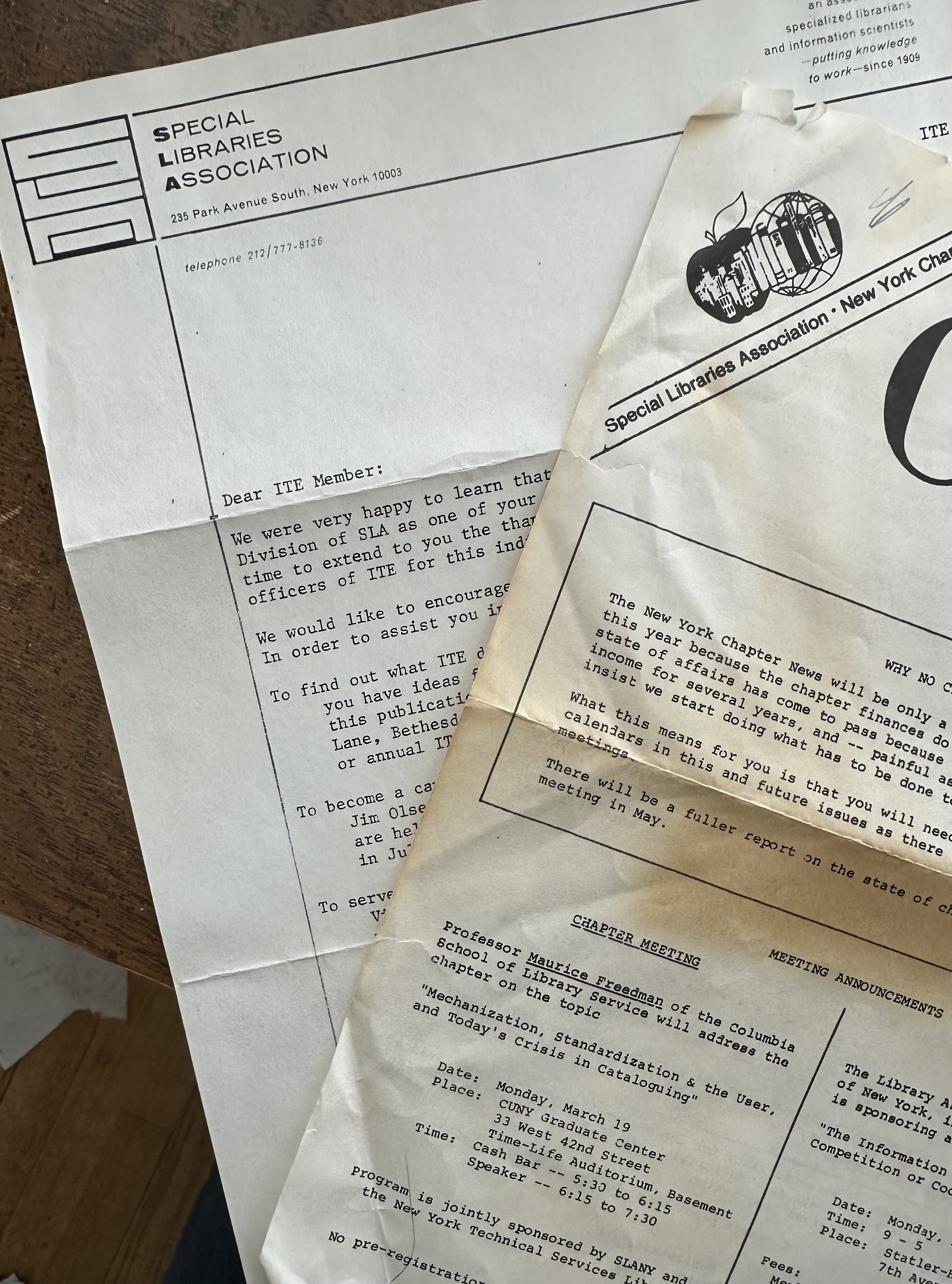
An association chapter newsletter and a letter welcoming signing up to a division, both from 1979

SLA grew into an international organization with members in over 75 countries and was organized by 55 regional Chapters. The local chapters of the association existed in cities, states, or other geographic areas; some assisted in maintaining job lists within their areas. Additionally, the SLA had a number of Divisions devoted to specific topic areas. Many Divisions also included sections for sub-specialties. Divisions included: Academic; Biomedical & Life Sciences; Business & Finance; Chemistry; Competitive Intelligence; Education; Engineering; Environment & Resource Management; Food, Agriculture & Nutrition; Government Information; Information Technology; Insurance & Employee Benefits; Knowledge Management; Legal; Leadership & Management; Military Libraries; Museums, Arts & Humanities; News; Petroleum & Energy Resources; Pharmaceutical & Health Technology; Physics-Astronomy-Mathematics; Science-Technology; Social Science; Solo Librarians; Taxonomy; and Transportation.

=== Naming controversy ===
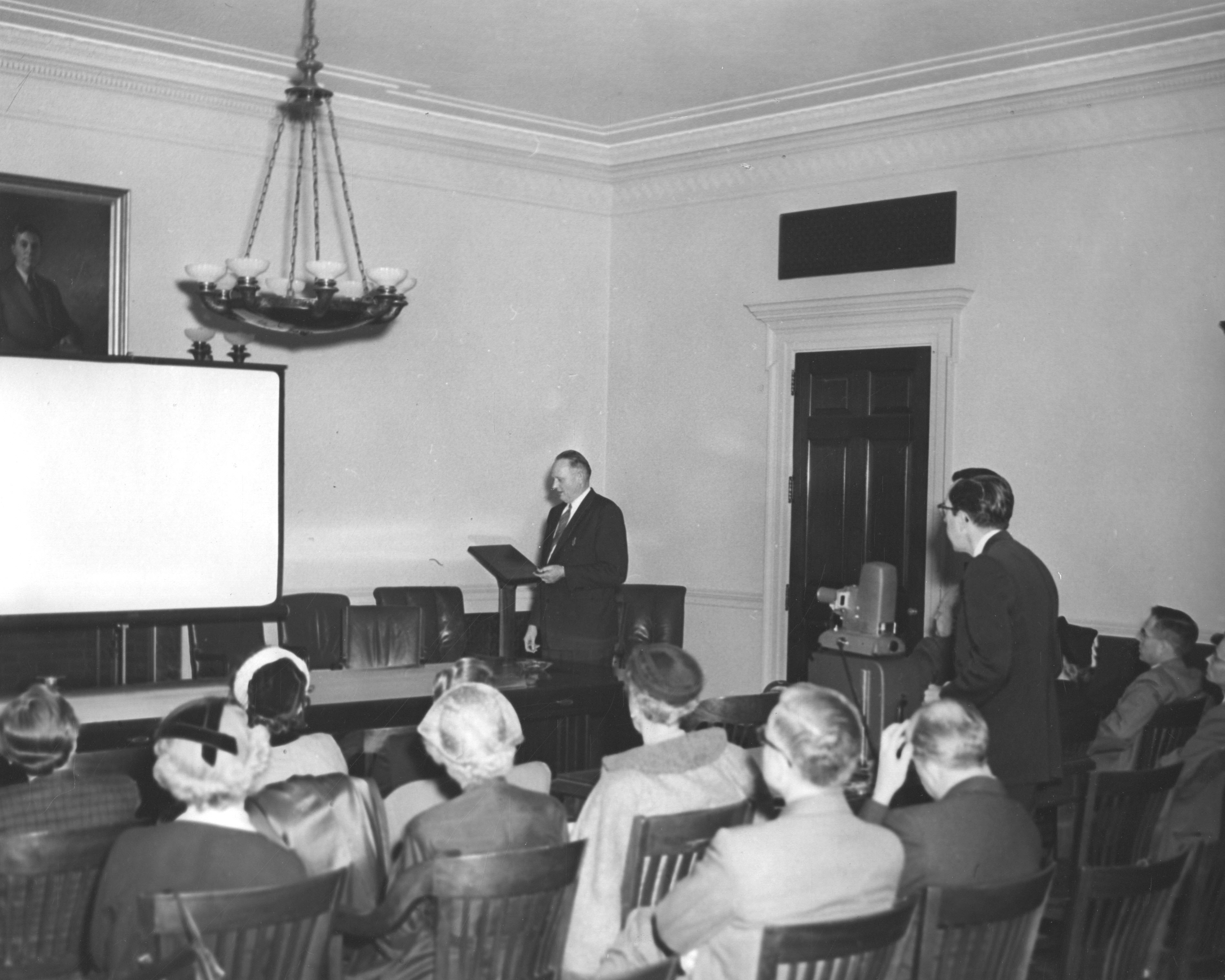
A meeting of the association's Picture Division in 1955

From the time of the founding of the SLA, there was some controversy surrounding the terminology used in the name Special Libraries Association. At the time of SLAs founding there was an almost immediate backlash against the term special library or special librarian. For some, the term was too specific in that it had been used on a limited basis to that time to define reference collections which were limited or narrow in some way. For others, the term was too broad, focusing on a general type of collection rather than the work that the special librarian does. John Cotton Dana himself acknowledged the inadequacy of the name in the years following SLA's founding but noted the term was chosen by default as no other term would be as accurate yet encompassing. This debate continued among organization members and official name changes were considered in 1982, 2003, and 2009 but they were eventually voted down by the membership.

During the early 2000s, there was an initiative to improve the branding of the association, which was seeing a decline in membership from around 14,400 in 1997 to 12,000 in 2002. At times there were efforts to make the brand "SLA" without reference to the "Library" part of the name; while numerous members were proud of being known as librarians, others felt it too narrow a category for the kind of work they were doing.

== Membership ==
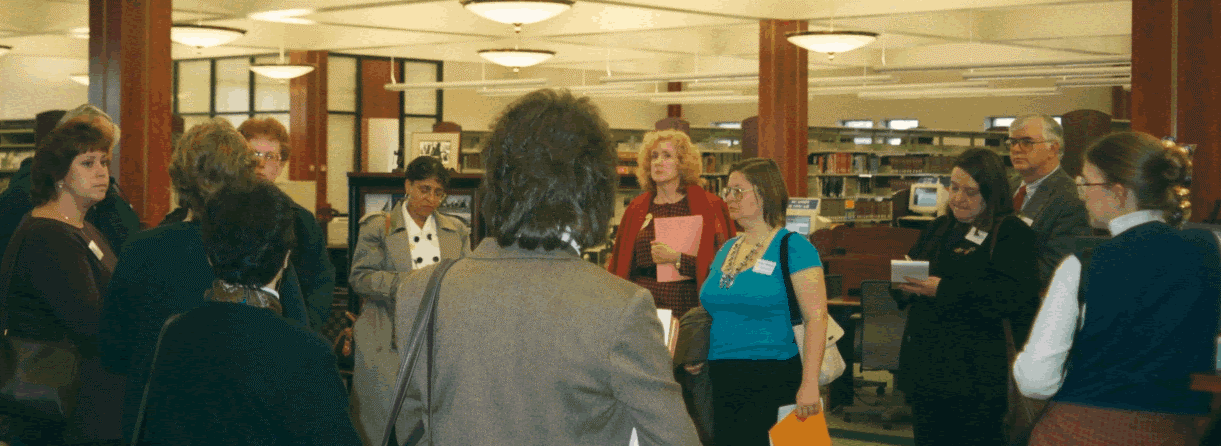
Military librarians tour the Armed Forces Staff College Library at Fort Monroe, Virginia, during the association's 1999 conference in Williamsburg

SLA membership was open to any person or organization. Members paid annual dues to SLA and additional fees for any Chapter, Division, or Caucus memberships they wished to obtain. Members of SLA typically possessed a master's degree in library or information science and may have had an advanced degree in a related field such as law, medicine or engineering. While special libraries include law libraries, news libraries, corporate libraries, museum libraries, medical libraries, and transportation libraries, many information professionals did not actually work in a library setting. They actively applied their specialized skills to support the information needs of their organizations. SLA members filled many non-traditional librarian roles such as corporate competitive intelligence analyst, researcher, or information specialist. Given the rapid adoption of information technologies for selecting, analyzing, managing, storing, and delivering information and knowledge, the average SLA member performed a range of services and employed a diverse mix of skills related to, but not exclusive of, library science. In fact, many special librarians did not work in a library, but rather an information center or resource center.

== Governing structure ==
The SLA was governed by a board of directors who were elected by the membership according to the parameters set out in the SLA's bylaws. The board of directors was responsible for the overall direction and management of the SLA and selected the organization's officers. The board of directors was led by a president who was elected for a one-year term. An executive director selected by the board oversaw the day-to-day management and functions of SLA. Each of the regional Chapters and topical Divisions of SLA also elected officers and conducted meetings in a similar fashion to SLA. Members were entitled to vote in board elections for each Chapter or Division in which they paid dues.

=== Committees and councils ===
Committees and Councils were established by the board of directors in order to coordinate its activities relating to achieving the goals and objectives of the association.

- Annual Conference Advisory Council
- Awards and Honors Committee
- Joint Governance and Bylaws Committee
- Emergency Preparedness & Recovery Advisory Council
- Finance Committee
- Industry Partners Alliance
- Information Outlook Advisory Council
- Membership Advisory Council
- Nominating Committee Online Content Advisory Council
- Professional Development Advisory Council
- Public Relations Advisory Council
- Students and New Professionals Advisory Council
- Student Groups
- Technology Advisory Council
- Transition CommitteeTransition Committee

=== Activities ===
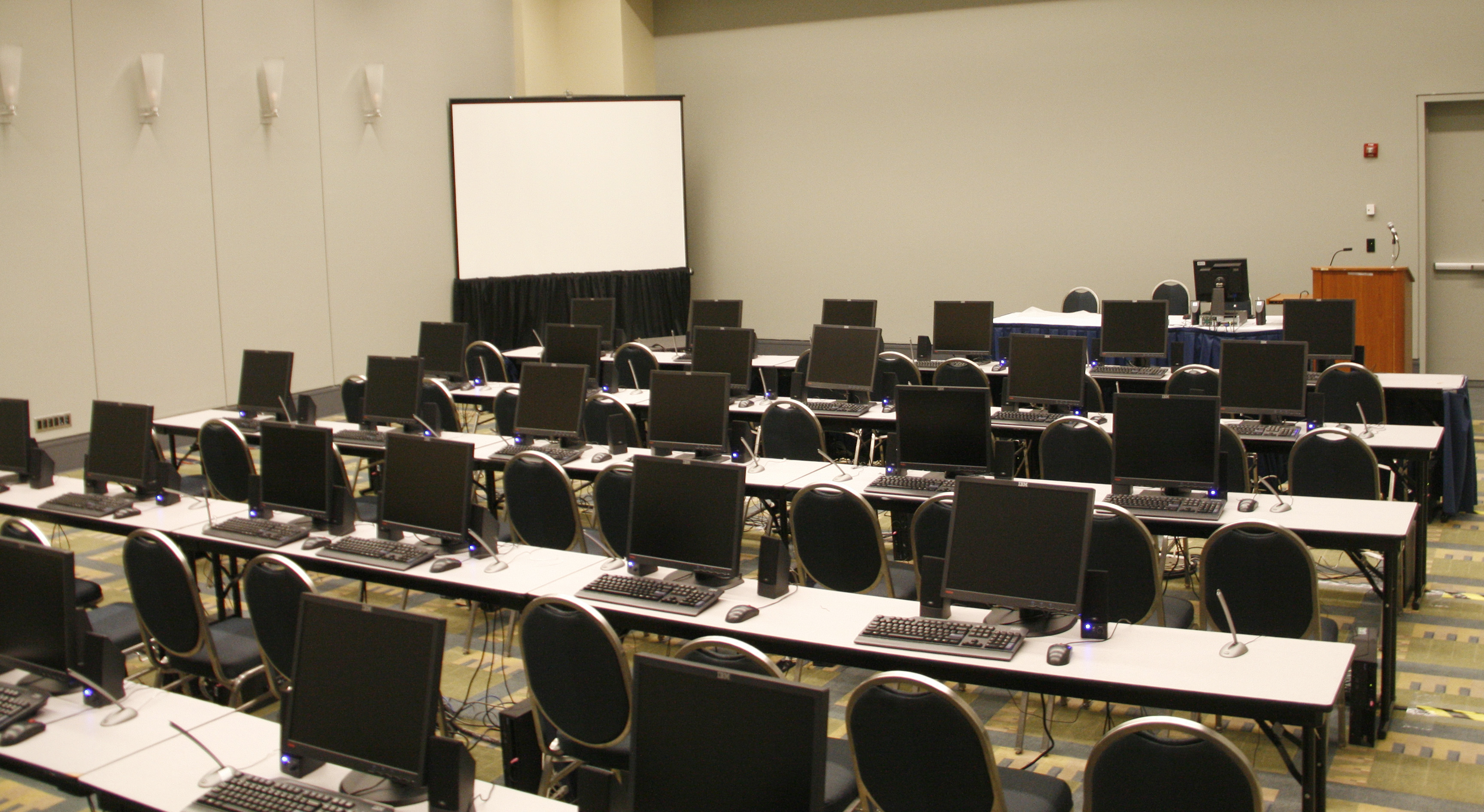
A session is prepared at the 2009 association conference in Washington DC

SLA activities included conferences, professional education, networking, and advocacy.

The SLA Annual Conference & INFO-EXPO, usually held in the summer, included education programs, networking events, and information exhibits. The conference was held in major cities such as New York, Nashville, and Los Angeles. In the mid-2000s, the conference was attracting several thousand attendees across the categories of members, exhibitors, and exhibition-only passes.

== Awards ==
The SLA presented several awards, some on an annual basis.

Fellowship in SLA was bestowed on active, mid-career SLA members in recognition of past, present and future service to the association and the profession. Fellows were called upon and expected to advise the association's board of directors, prepare necessary documentation, and alert the membership to issues and trends warranting action. No more than five SLA members could be selected as a Fellow in any given year. Individuals receiving this honor were able to use the title Fellow of the Special Libraries Association. Members who were currently serving on the SLA Board of Directors were ineligible for designation as Fellows.

John Cotton Dana Award was the SLA's top honor and was awarded to an individual in recognition of a lifetime of achievement and exceptional service to the SLA. (This should not be confused with the John Cotton Dana Library Public Relations Award, awarded by the American Library Association.)

Presidential Citations were given to SLA members for important or notable contributions advancing the SLA's goal or objectives during the previous year. The Presidential Citations were given at the pleasure of the SLA President.

Early Career Distinction was presented in recognition of an outstanding record of scholarly publications and valuable contributions to SLA and its goals and objectives.

Rose L. Vormelker Award was given to a mid-career SLA member who actively taught or mentored students or working professionals.

SLA Hall of Fame was presented to an SLA member near the end of their professional career in recognition of service and contributions to the SLA and its goal and objectives.

James M. Matarazzo Rising Star Award was presented annually to up to five new SLA members who had been members for no more than five years and showed exceptional promise of leadership and contribution to the association and profession (named in honor of James M. Matarazzo).

Nominees had to meet at least one of the following criteria:

- Performed outstanding work and professional activities on behalf of SLA
- Developed notable innovations on the job
- Actively participated in SLA units and association programs
- Promoted the visibility of SLA or the value of information professionals

Recipients received complimentary registration for the SLA Annual Conference & INFO-EXPO in the year in which they receive the award.

SLA Committee/Council/Unit Recognition Programs and SAAAC Merit Awards were presented by the SLA Student and Academic Affairs Advisory Council (SAAAC) in recognition of the active development and participation of student members through their involvement in SLA Student Group activities. Through these awards the SAAAC recognized and honored SLA Student Groups whose outstanding leadership, innovative programming, or creative use of electronic resources contributed to increased membership and expanded professional development. SAAAC awards were made based on documented quantitative and qualitative evidence pertaining to one or more of the following award criteria:

- Increased student group membership
- Expanded professional development opportunities (both formal and informal)
- Heightened profile of the SLA Student Group within their own school, on their own campus, or in the professional community
- Success in bringing educators and practicing special librarians together
- Increased or enhanced profile of special librarianship and/or SLA within the academic or broader community

Several other awards were given out at the Chapter and Division level as well at the SLA Annual Conference.

== Publications ==
- Special Libraries (1910–1996), a journal containing articles and columns on cataloging and indexing, book reviews, and information about the Special Library Association.
- Information Outlook (1997–2020), formerly Special Libraries, a bimonthly online professional/trade magazine. Publication ceased with the March-April 2020 issue. Information Outlook was relaunched in 2024 as a quarterly digital publication.

== See also ==
- List of libraries in the United States
