= Library Hall of Fame =

The United States-based Library Hall of Fame was a list created in 1951 that recognized leaders of the late 19th- and early 20th-century library movement, on the occasion of the 75th anniversary of the American Library Association.

A similar list was published in 1999, honoring "100 of the most important people in 20th-century librarianship," limited to "only people who lived and died in [the 20th century]."

== Members ==
Name	Both lists	1951 list	1999 list
Mary Eileen Ahern	Both		
Alexander P. Allain			1999
Edwin H. Anderson		1951	
May Hill Arbuthnot			1999
Lester E. Asheim			1999
Sarah B. Askew		1951	
Hugh Atkinson			1999
Augusta Baker			1999
William J. Barrow			1999
Mildred Leona Batchelder			1999
John Shaw Billings	Both		
William Warner Bishop			1999
Henry Bliss			1999
Sarah C. N. Bogle	Both		
Richard Rogers Bowker			1999
Arthur E. Bostwick		1951	
William Howard Brett	Both		
Pierce Butler			1999
Andrew Carnegie			1999
Leon Carnovsky			1999
Verner Warren Clapp			1999
David Horace Clift			1999
Fred C. Cole			1999
George Watson Cole			1999
Robert B. Croneberger			1999
Frederick M. Crunden		1951	
Arthur Curley			1999
Charles Ammi Cutter		1951	
John Cotton Dana	Both		
Sadie Peterson Delaney			1999
Melvil Dewey	Both		
William S. Dix			1999
Robert B. Downs			1999
Paul Dunkin			1999
Wilberforce Eames		1951	
Linda Eastman			1999
Margaret A. Edwards			1999
Theresa Elmendorf		1951	
Charles Evans	Both		
Luther Evans			1999
Salome C. Fairchild		1951	
William I. Fletcher		1951	
Jennie Flexner		1951	

Name	Both lists	1951 list	1999 list
Virginia Proctor Powell Florence			1999
Henry Clay Folger			1999
William E. Foster		1951	
Herman H. Fussler			1999
Loleta Fyan			1999
Mary Gaver			1999
James L. Gillis		1951	
Rudolph H. Gjelsness			1999
Fred Glazer			1999
Margaret Hayes Grazier			1999
Samuel Swett Green		1951	
Emerson Greenaway			1999
J. C. M. Hanson	Both		
Adelaide R. Hasse			1999
Mary E. Hazeltine		1951	
Frances E. Henne			1999
Caroline M. Hewins	Both		
Judson Toll Jennings		1951	
Charles C. Jewett		1951	
Carleton B. Joeckel			1999
Virginia Lacy Jones			1999
Frederick Paul Keppel			1999
Alice B. Kroeger		1951	
William Coolidge Lane		1951	
Josephus Nelson Larned		1951	
George H. Locke		1951	
Harry Miller Lydenberg			1999
Stephen McCarthy			1999
Archibald MacLeish			1999
Margaret Mann			1999
Charles Martel	Both		
Allie Beth Martin			1999
Frederic G. Melcher			1999
Keyes D. Metcalf			1999
Carl H. Milam			1999
Sydney B. Mitchell			1999
William Andrew Moffett			1999
Foster E. Mohrhardt			1999
Anne Carroll Moore			1999
Bessie Boehm Moore			1999
Everett T. Moore			1999
Isadore Gilbert Mudge			1999
L. Quincy Mumford			1999

Name	Both lists	1951 list	1999 list
Ralph Munn			1999
Margaret Norton			1999
Paul Evan Peters			1999
Mary Wright Plummer		1951	
William F. Poole		1951	
Effie Louise Power			1999
Herbert Putnam			1999
S.R. Ranganathan			1999
Josephine Rathbone		1951	
Joseph Henry Reason			1999
Ernest C. Richardson	Both		
Arthur Fremont Rider			1999
Frank Bradway Rogers			1999
Charlemae Rollins			1999
Francis R. St. John			1999
Frances Clarke Sayers			1999
Marvin Scilken			1999
Margaret C. Scoggin			1999
Minnie Earl Sears			1999
Katharine Sharp			1999
Ralph Shaw			1999
Jesse H. Shera			1999
Louis Shores			1999
Frances Lander Spain			1999
Forrest Spaulding			1999
Ainsworth Rand Spofford		1951	
Lutie E. Stearns		1951	
Mortimer Taube			1999
Maurice Tauber			1999
Reuben G. Thwaites		1951	
Alice S. Tyler		1951	
Ralph Ulveling			1999
George B. Utley	Both		
Robert G. Vosper			1999
Douglas Waples			1999
Joseph L. Wheeler			1999
Edward C. Williams			1999
Charles C. Williamson			1999
Halsey William Wilson			1999
Louis Round Wilson			1999
Constance M. Winchell			1999
Donald Goddard Wing			1999
Justin Winsor		1951	
