= Library of Congress Classification =

System of library classification

The Library of Congress Classification (LCC) is a system of library classification developed by the Library of Congress in the United States, which can be used for shelving books in a library. LCC is used by many large research and academic libraries. LCC was developed in 1897 by James Hanson (chief of the Catalog Department), with assistance from Charles Martel while they were working at the Library of Congress. It was designed specifically for the purposes and collection of the Library of Congress, to replace the fixed location system developed by Thomas Jefferson.

LCC has been criticized for lacking a sound theoretical basis; many of the classification decisions were driven by the practical needs of that library rather than epistemological considerations. Although it divides subjects into broad categories, it is essentially enumerative in nature. That is, it provides a guide to the books actually in one library's collections, not a classification of the world.

== History ==
The central core of the modern Library of Congress was formed from books sold to the government by Thomas Jefferson after the original collection was burned by the British in the War of 1812. As a result, the original classification system used by the library was of Jefferson's invention. However, by the end of the nineteenth century, the collection had grown to over a million volumes and his system was deemed too unwieldy.

John Russell Young, the seventh Librarian of Congress, hired James Hanson and Charles Martel in 1897, who began the development of a new classification system that would more accurately describe the collections the library held. Young's tenure as Librarian ended with his death in 1899, and his successor, Herbert Putnam, continued to implement the updates to the catalog through his long stay in the office. By the time he departed from his post in 1939, all the classes except K (Law) were well developed.

In creating their classification system, Hanson and Martel evaluated several systems already in existence, including the Dewey Decimal System, Charles Ammi Cutter's Cutter Expansive Classification, the Index Medicus, and the Putnam Classification System (developed while Putnam was head librarian at the Minneapolis Public Library). The one closest to their needs was Cutter's; however, he died before the completion of his system. Hanson and Martel thus decided to develop their own unique system, strongly based on his ideas. They published their first outline of the classification scheme in 1904. Development of the classes continued throughout the twentieth century. The last class to be developed was K (Law): the first K schedule was published in 1969 and not completed until the 2004 publication of KB.

From 1996 onwards, the LCC schedules were available online, and since 2013, there have been no new print editions of the classification system. All updates are now distributed by the Library's Cataloging Distribution Service entirely online.

== Design and organization ==
LCC divides all knowledge into twenty-one basic classes, each given a single letter of the alphabet as an identifier. Most of these classes are divided further into two and three level sub-classes. With these sub-classes, numerical ranges are assigned to topics, going from more general to more specific. Unlike in the Dewey Decimal Classification, where the numbers assigned to a topic iterate throughout the system (e.g., the ".05" tag indicated a periodical publication on the topic), the LCC numerical ranges are strictly hierarchical, corresponding only to their level in the outline. LCC is enumerative, meaning that it lists all the classes in officially published schedules, which are updated as needed by the Library of Congress.

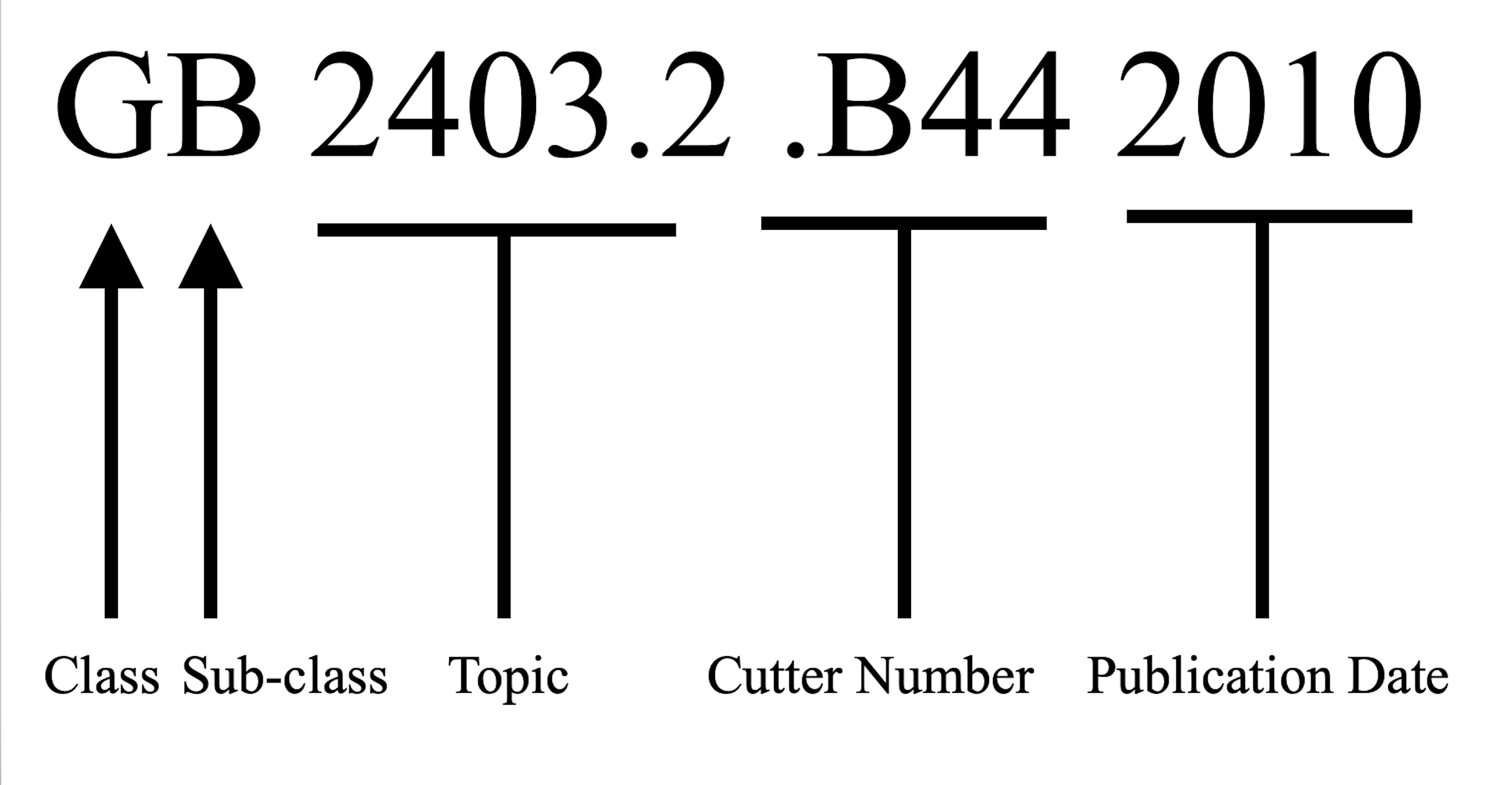
The call number for Glaciers and Glaciation (2nd edt.) by Benn & Evans. This indicates that it belongs to the broad class of "Geography, Anthropology, Recreation," the subclass of "Physical Geography," and the topic of "Ice. Glaciers. Ice sheets. Sea ice." B44 is the Cutter number, after the first author Benn, and 2010 represents the publication year.

After the range of numbers making up the topical division, call numbers often also include one or more Cutter numbers, modeled after the unfinished Cutter Expansive Classification index. The full LCC schedules contain tables that describe Cutter numbers for certain types of media, collections of work, and geographical areas. Cutter numbers also can take the form of an author-specific code, containing a letter and several numbers corresponding to the author's last name. This serves to further distinguish publications and nominally alphabetize volumes within a topic section. The final component of a typical LCC call-number is the publication year, in full. Library collections can add modifiers to distinguish specific volumes, such as "Copy 1."

LCC should not be confused with Library of Congress Control Numbers (LCCN), which are assigned to all books (and authors) and defines online catalog entries. (Note: LCCN also covers authors, which LCC does not. For authors (people), the letter 'n' accompanies the number, and they too define URLs in a parallel catalog, such as "n83160096" and "http://lccn.loc.gov/n83160096 ". (So LCCN may be called alphanumeric.)) Library of Congress Classification is also distinct from Library of Congress Subject Headings, the system of labels such as "Glaciers" and "Glaciers—Fiction" that describe contents systematically. (Note: LCSH too is developed by the Library and assigns alphanumeric IDs. A closer look at this example shows refinements defined in 2004, 2007, and 2009. LCSH: Boarding schools.)

One variation from the original LCC system is the National Library of Medicine classification system (NLM), which uses the initial letters W and QS–QZ, which are not used by LCC. Some libraries use NLM in conjunction with LCC, eschewing LCC's R, QM, and QP, which overlap with NLM's schema. Another is the Canadian Universities and the Canadian National Library using FC for Canadian History, a subclass that LCC has not officially adopted, but which it has agreed not to use for anything else.

Classes
Letter	Subject area
A	General Works
B	Philosophy, Psychology, Religion
C	Auxiliary Sciences of History
D	World History and History of Europe, Asia, Africa, Australia, New Zealand, etc.
E	History of America
F	History of the Americas
G	Geography, Anthropology, and Recreation
H	Social Sciences
J	Political Science
K	Law
L	Education
M	Music
N	Fine Arts
P	Language and Literature
Q	Science
R	Medicine
S	Agriculture
T	Technology
U	Military Science
V	Naval Science
Z	Bibliography, Library Science, and General Information Resources

== Use and criticism ==
Together, the Dewey Decimal System (DDC) and LCC make up the two main classification systems used in U.S. libraries. LCC is favored by large academic and research libraries.

Systems of classification can be evaluated on several metrics, including expressiveness (the ability of the numeration system to express the hierarchal and correlative relationships between topics), hospitality (the ability of the system to accommodate new subjects), and brevity (length of call numbers). While LCC is significantly less expressive than DDC, it is extremely hospitable, mainly in the fact that five classes (I, O, W, X, and Y) lack any assignment to topics. LCC call numbers also tend to be shorter than those in DDC.

The main difference between DDC and LCC is their approach to classifying. Dewey's system is a comprehensive classification to all topics, with no regard to the actual collections a library might hold. While this has allowed it to be successfully adapted into more modern classification systems for use outside of libraries, such as the Universal Decimal Classification (UDC), it does make it more unwieldy for large or specialized collections. On the other hand, Hanson and Martel designed LCC specifically for library use, which means while it does not completely enumerate the world, it does more reflect what books a library might hold.

Because LCC was designed around the collections of the Library of Congress, it has an American, European, and Christian bias, as reflected mainly in the earlier developed schedules of D (World History), E and F (History of the Americas), and B (Philosophy, Psychology, Religion). On the other hand, the later-developed K (Law) gives fairly even weight to global law. Today, the various schedules are maintained and revised by the Library's Policy and Standards Division, in conjunction with experts in each field. However, updating various schedules with classification biases is generally assumed to be impractical due to the massive workload that would result in, especially as the "discipline" based classes of LCC have been entrenched in the average library user's mind.

Like all classification systems, LCC struggles with catering to interdisciplinary scholars and topics, as ultimately, a book can only be shelved in a single location. Additionally, LCC has a problem with "othering" marginalized groups, making works related to or authored by members of these groups particularly difficult to locate. This is not a new issue, and libraries with more specialized collections about minority groups or issues sometimes eschew LCC, with one example alternative classification being the Harvard–Yenching Classification, specifically developed for Chinese language materials.

== See also ==
- ACM Computing Classification System
- Books in the United States
- Brian Deer Classification System
- Brinkler classification
- Chinese Library Classification
- Database of Recorded American Music
- Dewey Decimal Classification
- Harvard–Yenching Classification
- Moys Classification Scheme
- ISBN
- Minnie Earl Sears, formulated Sears Subject Headings, simplified for use by small libraries
- MARC standards
- Resource Description and Access
- Statement of International Cataloguing Principles
- Anglo-American Cataloguing Rules
