= Drachma =

Drachma may refer to:

- Ancient drachma, an ancient Greek currency
- Modern drachma, Greek currency used from 1833 until replaced by the euro in 2002
- Cretan drachma, currency of the former Cretan State
- Drachma proctocomys, moth species, the only species in the Genus Drachma

== See also ==
- Dram (disambiguation)
- Dirham
