= Tennessee State Library and Archives =

Repository in Nashville, Tennessee, US

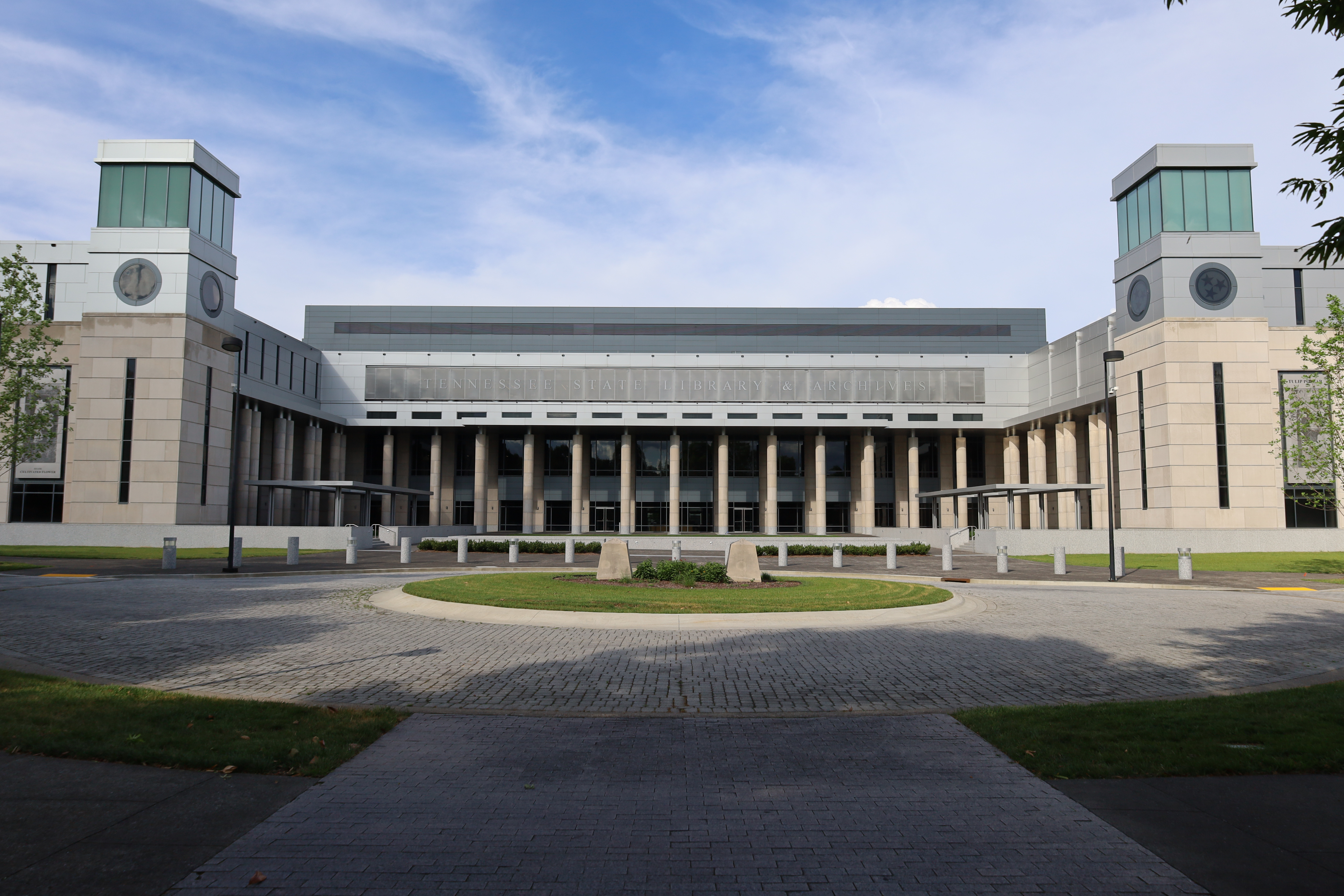
- The new building in 2022
- 36°9′56″N 86°47′7″W
- Location: 1001 Rep. John Lewis Way North, Nashville, Tennessee

Other information
- Website: https://sos.tn.gov/tsla

The Tennessee State Library and Archives (TSLA), established in 1854, currently operates as a unit of the Tennessee Department of State. According to the Tennessee Blue Book, the Library and Archives "collects and preserves books and records of historical, documentary and reference value, and encourages and promotes library development throughout the state." This mandate can be found in Tennessee Code Annotated, Title 10, Chapters 1-8.

Although most states operate their libraries and archives as separate agencies, Tennessee is one of a handful of states whose library and archives are administered jointly.

== History ==
The state library's original home (after a short stint in the Davidson County courthouse) was in the capitol building, while the archives were formerly housed in the basement of the state's War Memorial Building.

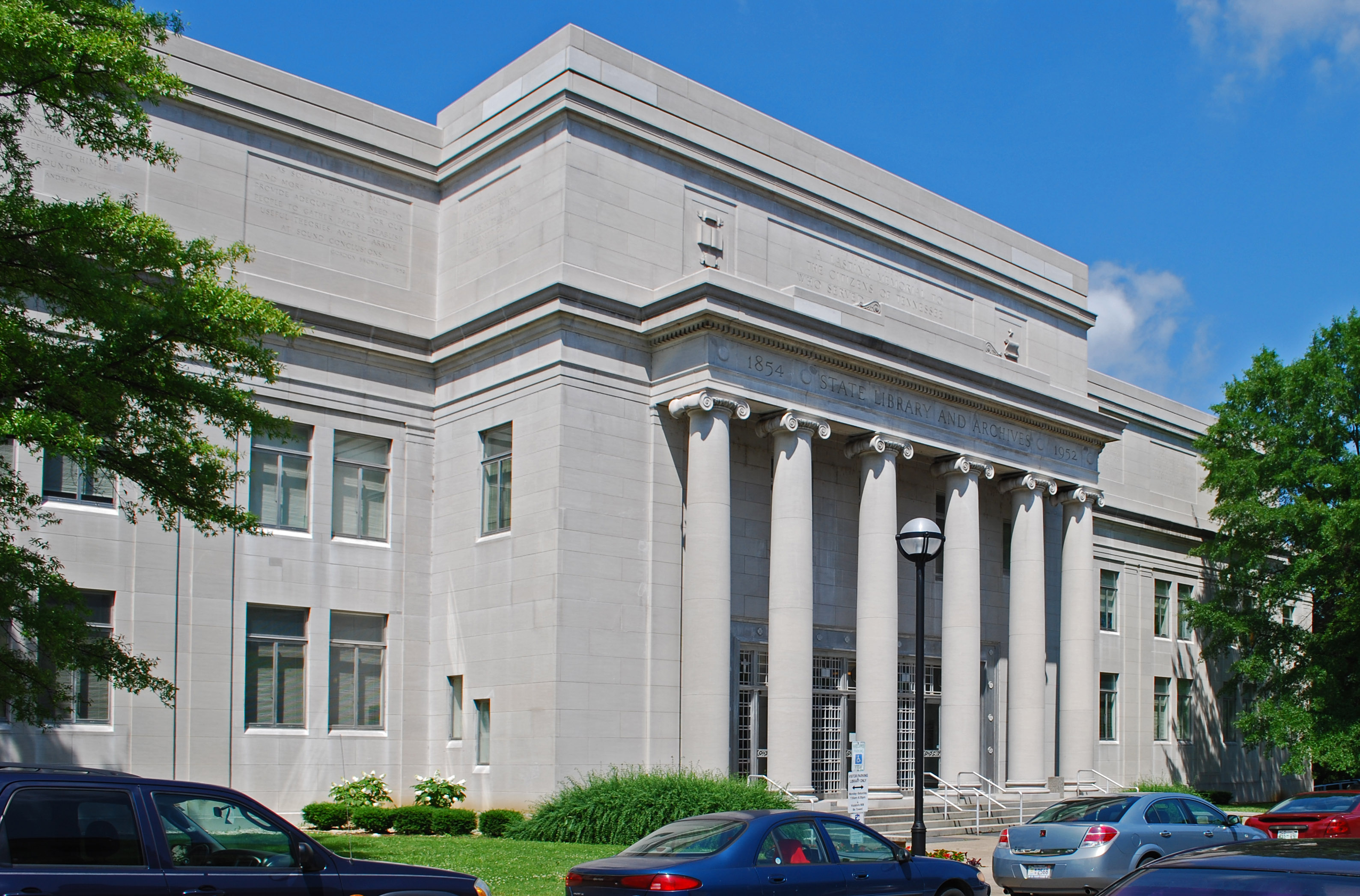
A view of the Tennessee State Library and Archives building that was built in 1953. It was located at 403 Seventh Avenue North, near the Tennessee State Capitol building.

Tennessee's General Assembly joined the Department of Archives and History with the State Library in 1919 to create the State Library and Archives.

In 1953, a new Tennessee State Library and Archives building opened. Designed by H. Clinton Parrent Jr., the building was across the street from the Tennessee State Capitol in downtown Nashville. Built as a memorial to all veterans of World War II, the Library and Archives building was constructed at a cost of $2.3 million. On November 17, 2003, the Tennessee State Library and Archives building was added to the National Register of Historic Places for its educational significance and its neo classical architectural design.

After more than fifty years of being located on Capitol Hill, the need for a larger facility to house collections, improve climate control and provide better handicapped access became necessary. In 2005, plans began to be made for the construction of a new Library and Archives building. After many years of planning and budget issues, the 110th Tennessee General Assembly approved funding for a new building in 2017.

The State of Tennessee officially broke ground for a new Tennessee State Library and Archives building during a ceremony held on December 11, 2017. Designed by Tuck-Hinton Architects, the new building is located next to Bicentennial State Park on the corner of Rep. John Lewis Way and Jefferson Street. The cost of the new building was estimated to be $123.8 million. The new 165,000 square foot facility includes a climate-controlled chamber for storing historic books and manuscripts with a space saving robotic retrieval system. A new blast freezer will allow TSLA staff to help save materials damaged by water or insects following floods and other disasters. The new facility also has classrooms for student groups and meeting space for training librarians and archivists.

== Library for Accessible Books and Media (LABM) ==
In 1970, a new division of TSLA, the Tennessee Library for the Blind & Physically Handicapped (LBPH) was established. On March 9, 2018, the LBPH changed its name to the Tennessee Library for Accessible Books and Media (LABM).

This division's collections consist of public library type books and magazines in audio, braille and large print formats, as well as players for the audio books. The LABM's collections are loaned to Tennesseans who have physical disabilities which prevent them from using standard print. The materials are delivered to the individual patron's home address utilizing the U.S. Postal Service's "Free Matter" mailing privilege.

Disabilities which make a Tennessee resident eligible to use the service are: blindness; visual disability; manual dexterity problems, which prevent holding a book and/or turning pages; and reading disabilities.

The Tennessee LABM is a cooperating library with the National Library Service for the Blind & Physically Handicapped/Library of Congress.

== Holdings and collection highlights ==
The Tennessee State Library and Archives currently holds nearly 700,000 print volumes, over a million photographic images, thousands of vertical files, microfilm reels, and legislative audiocassettes. Archives and manuscripts collections are housed in nearly 40,000 feet (12,000 m) of storage. The Library for Accessible Books and Media holds approximately 240,000 items.

TSLA holds the most comprehensive collection of Tennessee newspapers, which dates to 1791.

== Tennessee State Librarians and Archivists, 1854 to present ==
- W.B.A. Ramsey, ex officio librarian (1854–1855)
- F.N.W. Burton, ex officio librarian (1855–1856)
- R.J. Meigs, State Librarian (1856–1861)
- John E. Hatcher, State Librarian (1861)
- Augustin Gattinger, State Librarian (1864–1869)
- W.H. Wharton, State Librarian (1869–1871)
- Mrs. Paralee Haskell, State Librarian (1871–1879)
- Mrs. Robert Hatton, State Librarian (1879–1887)
- Mrs. Sue P. Lowe, State Librarian (1887–1891)
- Mrs. Linnie Williams, State Librarian (1891–1895)
- Mrs. Irene Ingram, State Librarian (1895–1897)
- Miss Pauline Jones, State Librarian (1897–1899)
- Miss Jennie E. Lauderdale, State Librarian (1899–1901)
- Mrs. Lulu B. Epperson, State Librarian (1901–1903)
- Miss Mary Skeffington, State Librarian (1903–1919)
- John Trotwood Moore, State Librarian and Archivist (1919–1929)
- Mary Brown Daniel Moore, State Librarian and Archivist (1929–1949)
- Daniel M. Robison, State Librarian (1949–1961)
- William T. Alderson, Jr., State Librarian (1961–1964)
- Sam B. Smith, State Librarian and Archivist (1964–1969)
- Wilmon H. Droze, State Librarian and Archivist (1969–1972)
- Katheryn Culbertson, State Librarian and Archivist (1972–1982)
- Olivia K. Young, State Librarian and Archivist (1982–1985)
- Robert B. Croneberger, State Librarian and Archivist (1985–1986)
- Edwin S. Gleaves, State Librarian and Archivist (1987–2005)
- Jeanne Sugg, State Librarian and Archivist (2005–2010)
- Charles Sherrill, State Librarian and Archivist (2010-2022)
- Jamie Ritter, State Librarian and Archivist (2022-current)

== See also ==
- List of libraries in the United States
