= Henry Munson Utley =

American librarian

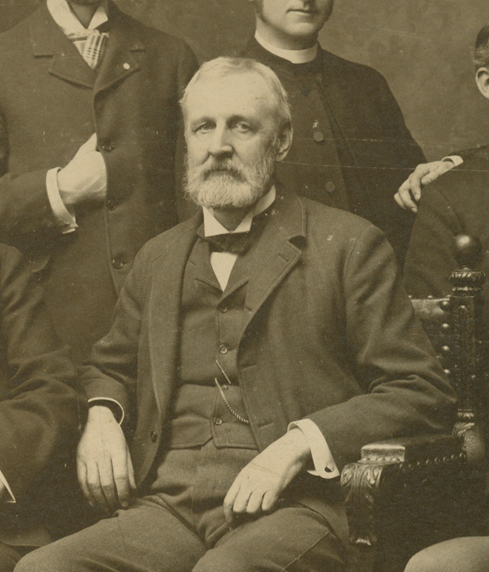
- Henry Munson Utley in 1898

President of the American Library Association
- In office 1894–1895
- Preceded by: Josephus Nelson Larned
- Succeeded by: John Cotton Dana

Personal details
- Born: August 5, 1836 Plymouth, Michigan, United States
- Died: February 16, 1917 (aged 80) Detroit, Michigan, United States
- Education: University of Michigan
- Occupation: Librarian; journalist

Henry Munson Utley (August 5, 1836 – February 16, 1917) was an American librarian. Utley served as president of the American Library Association from 1894 to 1895.

== Early life and education ==
Utley was born in Wayne County, Michigan on August 5, 1836. After attending the local district schools, he prepared for college at the Ypsilanti Union Seminary in Washtenaw County. Utley graduated from the University of Michigan with a Bachelor of Arts degree in 1861 and a Master of Arts degree in 1870.

== Career ==
After graduation from the University of Michigan in June 1861, Utley went to work as a reporter for the Detroit Free Press. In April 1966, he left the Free Press to become city editor for the new Detroit Post. Utley remained with that newspaper after it merged with the Detroit Advertiser and Tribune to form the Detroit Post and Tribune in 1877. In November 1880, he was elected secretary of the Detroit Board of Education and left the Post and Tribune in January 1881 to assume that office.

== Later life and death ==
Utley was named City Librarian for the City of Detroit in July 1885. He retired from that position in 1913. Utley died in Detroit on February 16, 1917.

== Bibliography ==
- Volume 1: Michigan as a province, from its discovery and settlement by the French to its final surrender to the United States Michigan as a province, territory and state, the twenty-sixth member of the federal Union (Publishing Society of Michigan, 1906)
- Volume 4: Michigan as a state, from the close of the civil war to the end of the nineteenth century Michigan as a province, territory and state, the twenty-sixth member of the federal Union (Publishing Society of Michigan, 1906)

== See also ==
- Detroit Public Library

Non-profit organization positions
Preceded by Josephus Nelson Larned	President of the American Library Association; 1894–1895	Succeeded by John Cotton Dana
