= Mary Eileen Ahern =

American librarian (1860–1938)

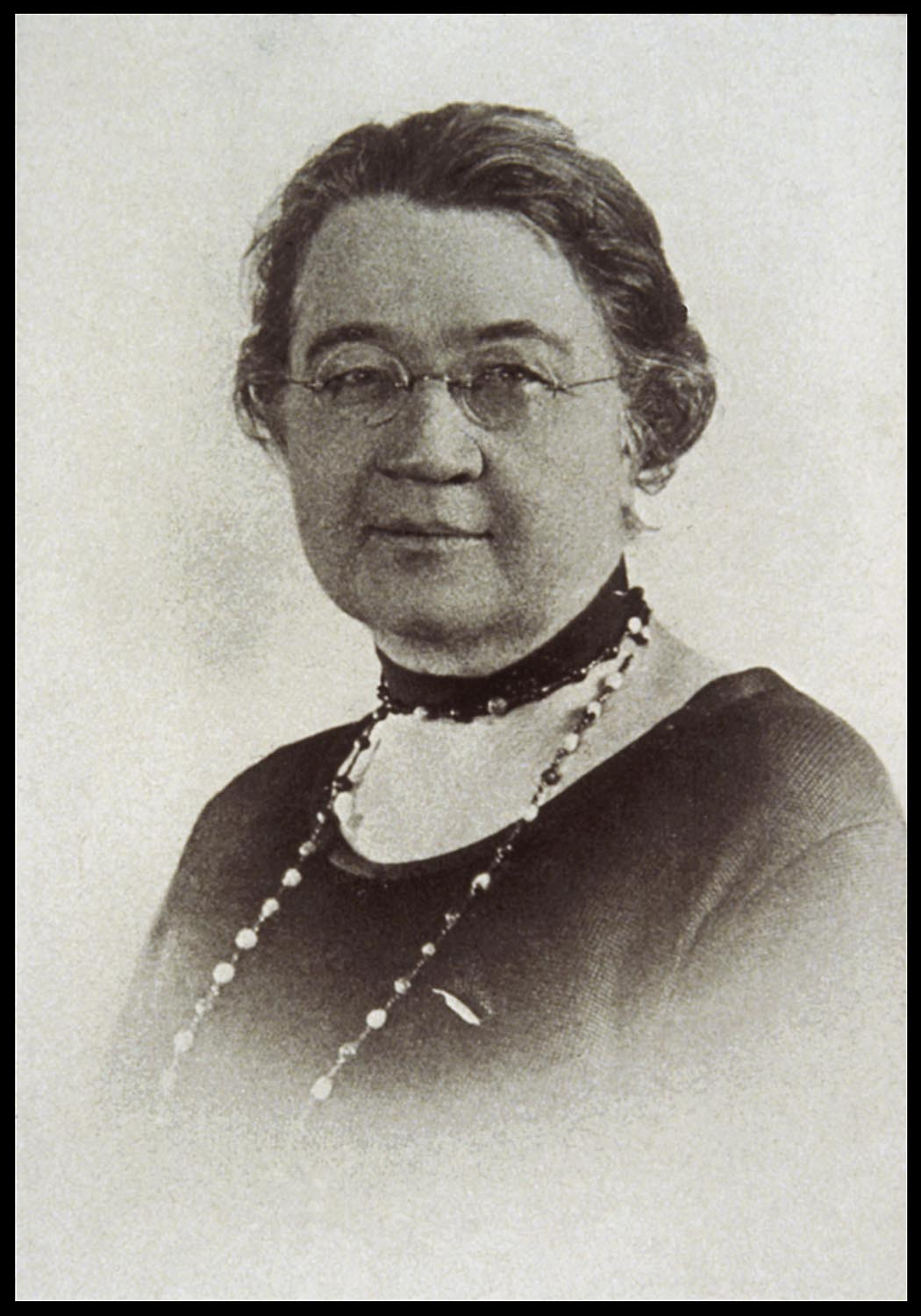
- Born: October 1, 1860; Marion County
- Died: May 22, 1938 (aged 77)
- Education: Canterbury College, Illinois Institute of Technology, Armour Institute
- Occupation: Librarian, editor
- Position held: state librarian (1889–1895), president (1908–1909), president

Mary Eileen Ahern (October 1, 1860 – May 22, 1938) was an American librarian, a leader of the modern library movement, and an early organizer of libraries in the United States. Throughout her career as a state librarian, journal editor, public speaker, and organizer, Ahern crusaded for the value of public libraries in educating the public. Ahern was inducted in the Library Hall of Fame in 1951, and named in American Libraries in 1999 as one of the "100 of the Most Important Leaders We Had in the 20th Century."

== Early life ==
Mary Eileen Ahern was born October 1, 1860, in rural Marion County, Indiana, to Mary (O'Neal) and William Ahern. Both of her parents were Irish immigrants. Mary Eileen, the second of three children, moved with her family to Spencer, Indiana, at the age of ten. She graduated from Spencer High School in 1878 and enrolled at Central Normal College in Danville, Indiana, where she graduated in 1881.

== Career ==
=== State librarian ===
After graduating from college, Ahern worked as an Indiana public school teacher until 1889, when she was appointed as the Indiana assistant state librarian. Ahern's early work at the state library included cataloging its collections. In 1893 the state legislature appointed Ahern as the Indiana state librarian, a political position that she retained until 1895.

Ahern was outspoken in her fight for change at the state library, which included convincing the state's politicians to depoliticize the library's leadership appointments and to place the library under the Indiana Department of Education. Ahern's efforts were successful, not for herself but for future librarians. As a condition of the political compromise that was reached, she agreed not to seek reappointment as state librarian. Ahern stepped down as Indiana's state librarian and left state government in 1895, but continued to remain active in state, national, and international efforts to improve public libraries. She also encouraged the development of the modern library movement. After Ahern's political appointment ended, she left Indiana to pursue a formal library education at the Library School of the Armour Institute of Technology in Chicago, Illinois, for a year.

=== Journal editor ===
After completing her library studies in Chicago, Ahern accepted a position as the founding editor of a new journal, Public Libraries (later shortened to Libraries). She edited the journal from her base in Chicago for the next thirty-six years. Deteriorating eyesight forced her to give up her editorship in 1931. Following her retirement, the publishers decided the journal could not continue without her editorial leadership. Its final issue was a tribute to her many years of service.

Ahern clearly stated her views on the value of public education, beginning in the first volume, second issue, of Public Libraries: "There is only one solution of all social problems, an increase in intelligence, a gradual education of the people." She further argued that a public library could provide the best source of this education because it "is the broadest of teachers, one may almost say the only free teacher. It is the most liberal of schools; it is the only real people's college." The journal's tag lines also publicized and promoted the valued public libraries: "The Public Library is an Integral Part of Public Education" and "The best reading for the greatest number, at the least cost."

Ahern became an influential authority on public policy issues related to libraries through her writing and public appearances across the county. She described her vision for public libraries, as well as providing practical professional development resources for libraries, and influenced librarians and library practice throughout the United States.

=== Other contributions ===
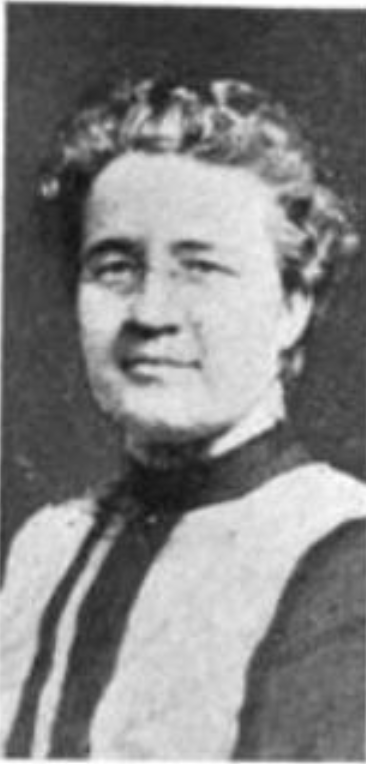
Ahern in 1906

Ahern was an organizer and avid participant in several library organizations in addition to her journalistic work. While serving as the Indiana assistant state librarian Ahern established the Indiana Library Association, serving as its secretary from 1889 to 1896 and as its president in 1895. Ahern served three times as president of the Illinois Library Association. She was also a lifelong member of the American Library Association, active on numerous ALA committees, and a member of its board.

At the thirteenth annual meeting of the Illinois Library Association, when Ahern was serving as the organization's president, she delivered the annual address with these words of encouragement: "We are librarians because we feel that in these lines there are greater opportunities for helpfulness, greater vistas of optimistic outlook, greater results in actual returns of the worthwhile, than in any other line of work which we might have chosen."

Ahern also served in the federal government and as secretary of the Library Department of the National Education Association. During World War I she served as publicity agent and distributed books for the U.S. military in France from January to July 1919. Ahern continued to learn and advocate for changes in library policy. In 1927 she returned to Europe to study the library systems in France and England.

== Death and legacy ==
Ahern died on a train near Atlanta, Georgia, as she was traveling home to Chicago on May 22, 1938.

Ahern is best known for her widespread influence in establishing and strengthening connections between libraries and schools in the United States. She was also an advocate for women in the profession and saw the potential of libraries to provide lifelong educational opportunities to the public. As the British librarian W. C. Berwick Sayers described her: "How intensely alive Miss Ahern seemed, how full of ideas, ideals, enthusiasms, how enquiringly humorous!"

== Honors and tributes ==
- Inducted into the Library Hall of Fame in 1951.
- Named in American Libraries in 1999 as one of the "100 of the Most Important Leaders We Had in the 20th Century."
