= Harvard–Yenching Classification =

Library classification system

The Harvard–Yenching Classification System is a library classification system for Chinese language materials in the United States of America. It was devised by Alfred Kaiming Chiu. The system was primarily created for the classification of Chinese language materials in the Harvard–Yenching Library which was founded in 1927 at the Harvard–Yenching Institute.

During that early period other systems, such as the early edition of the Library of Congress Classification, did not consist of appropriate subject headings to classify the Chinese language materials, particularly the ancient published materials. As many American libraries started to collect the ancient and contemporary published materials from China, a number of American libraries subsequently followed Harvard University to adopt Harvard–Yenching classification system, such as the East Asian Library of the University of California, Berkeley, Columbia University, University of Chicago, Washington University in St. Louis etc.

In addition to American libraries, the libraries of other universities in the world including England, Australia, New Zealand, Hong Kong, Singapore etc. also followed Harvard University to adopt the system. During the period from the 1930s to the 1970s, the use of the system became popular for classifying not only Chinese language materials but also other East Asian materials including Korean and Japanese language materials.

During the period from the 1970s to the 1980s, a comprehensive subset of subject headings for Chinese language materials was gradually established in the Library of Congress Classification System so that almost a full spectrum of ancient and contemporary Chinese topics can be widely covered. As a result of this, the Library of Congress Classification System eventually replaced the Harvard–Yenching Classification System for all Chinese language materials acquired after the 1970s in many American Libraries.

Though the system has largely been phased out, the system is still being used in some libraries for Chinese language materials acquired prior to the Library of Congress update. Such previously acquired books are normally stored in separate stacks in libraries. However, some of the university libraries in the Commonwealth countries of the United Kingdom such as England, Australia and New Zealand still continue to use the Harvard–Yenching system; for example, the Institute for Chinese Studies Library of the University of Oxford, University of Sydney, and University of Auckland.

== See also ==
The official library classification in China is:

- Chinese Library Classification (CLC)

The other library classifications for Chinese materials outside China are:

- Cambridge University Library Chinese Classification System, Classification Scheme for Chinese Books drawn up by Profs. Haloun and P. van der Loon for Cambridge University, UK.
- University of Leeds Classification of Books in Chinese, UK (36 pages of Catalog in pdf)
