= Dram =

Dram, dram, or DRAM may refer to:

== Technology and engineering ==
- Dram (unit), a unit of mass and volume, and an informal name for a small amount of liquor, especially whisky or whiskey
- Dynamic random-access memory, a type of electronic semiconductor memory
- Dram, Welsh term for a minecart, a small railway cargo truck used in a mine railway

== Currency and geography ==
- Dram, Armenian for "money"
  - Armenian dram, a monetary unit
  - Artsakh dram (formerly Nagorno-Karabakh dram), a monetary unit
- Dram, the Tibetan name for the town of Zhangmu on the Nepal-Tibet border
- Historic English name for Drammen, Norway

== Music ==
- DRAM (musician) (Shelley Marshaun Massenburg-Smith, born 1988), American rapper and actor
- Database of Recorded American Music, an online resource
- The Drams, an American band made up of members of Slobberbone

== See also ==
- Dram shop, a bar, tavern or similar commercial establishment where alcoholic beverages are sold
- Dirham, a unit of currency, derived from the dram unit of mass
- Drama (disambiguation)
