= Lutie Stearns =

American librarian (1866–1943)

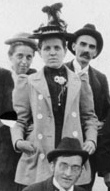
- Born: September 13, 1866; Stoughton
- Died: December 25, 1943
- Education: Wisconsin State College of Milwaukee
- Occupation: Librarian

Lutie Eugenia Stearns (September 13, 1866 – December 25, 1943) was an American teacher, librarian, author, speaker and political activist, known to some as "the Johnny Appleseed of books" for her innovative traveling library projects for the Wisconsin Free Library Commission, and is a member of the Library Hall of Fame list created in 1951.

== Early life ==
Stearns was born in Stoughton, Massachusetts on September 13, 1866. Naturally left-handed, she was challenged in school to become right-handed; these frustrations are believed to be responsible for her stutter, which stayed with her permanently. In 1871, her family moved to Milwaukee, Wisconsin. She attended Milwaukee State Normal School and graduated 1886. In the 1886 she began working as a teacher Milwaukee Public Schools. The way she collected the books caught Minnie M. Oakley's attention and secured her a library position when Minnie M. Oakley died.

== Career ==
=== Librarianship ===
From 1886 to 1888, Stearns worked in the Milwaukee Public Library system. She started in the fall of 1886. She realized a disparity in understanding between German and American students with expressions and cultural items. She decided to collect books to help them with exposure to words and ideas and gain literacy. The way she collected them caught the attention of Minnie M. Oakley in the Circulation department of Milwaukee Public Library. This secured her a Library position when Minnie M. Oakley died.

From 1888 to 1895, Lutie Stearns worked for the Milwaukee Public Library in the circulation department. She became the head of the department by 1890, but meanwhile she worked to ensure children, educators, and parents had access to material that would support literacy. She often read to children while still donating books to libraries.

From 1895 to 1914, Stearns worked for the Wisconsin Free Library Commission where she led efforts to promote library services throughout the state. Stearns believed books have the power to change peoples' lives. She followed this belief by providing books at 1500 locations in Wisconsin through traveling libraries between 1895 and 1914. She also helped organize a 30 county cooperative library and 150 permanent Library buildings. In order to deliver her donated books, she would often travel by stagecoach, by train, and by sleigh in personally ensure they reached every corner of Milwaukee and its surrounding area.

=== Political life ===
In 1914, Stearns left librarianship to devote herself full-time to lecturing on a variety of topics. She traveled to 38 states to speak on prohibition, women's rights, the League of Nations, industrial reform, peace, and education. She also wrote a column for the Milkwaukee Journal entitled "As a Woman Sees It".

== Honors ==
In 1951 she was one of 40 of America's most significant library leaders selected by the Library Journal for inclusion in a "Library Hall of Fame". She was also in the first group of librarians to be inducted into the Wisconsin Library Hall of Fame in 2008.

== Personal life ==
Sterns died in Milwaukee on Christmas Day, December 25, 1943.

== Selected publications ==
- The Question of Library Training (1905)
- Traveling Libraries in Wisconsin (1910)
- List of Books for Girls and Young Women (1911)
- Essentials in Library Administration (1912)
- My Seventy-Five Years: Part I, 1866-1914 (1959)
- My Seventy-Five Years: Part II, 1914-1942 (1959)
- My Seventy-Five Years: Part III, Increasingly Personal (1959–60)
