= Charles Martel (librarian) =

Swiss-American librarian (1860–1945)

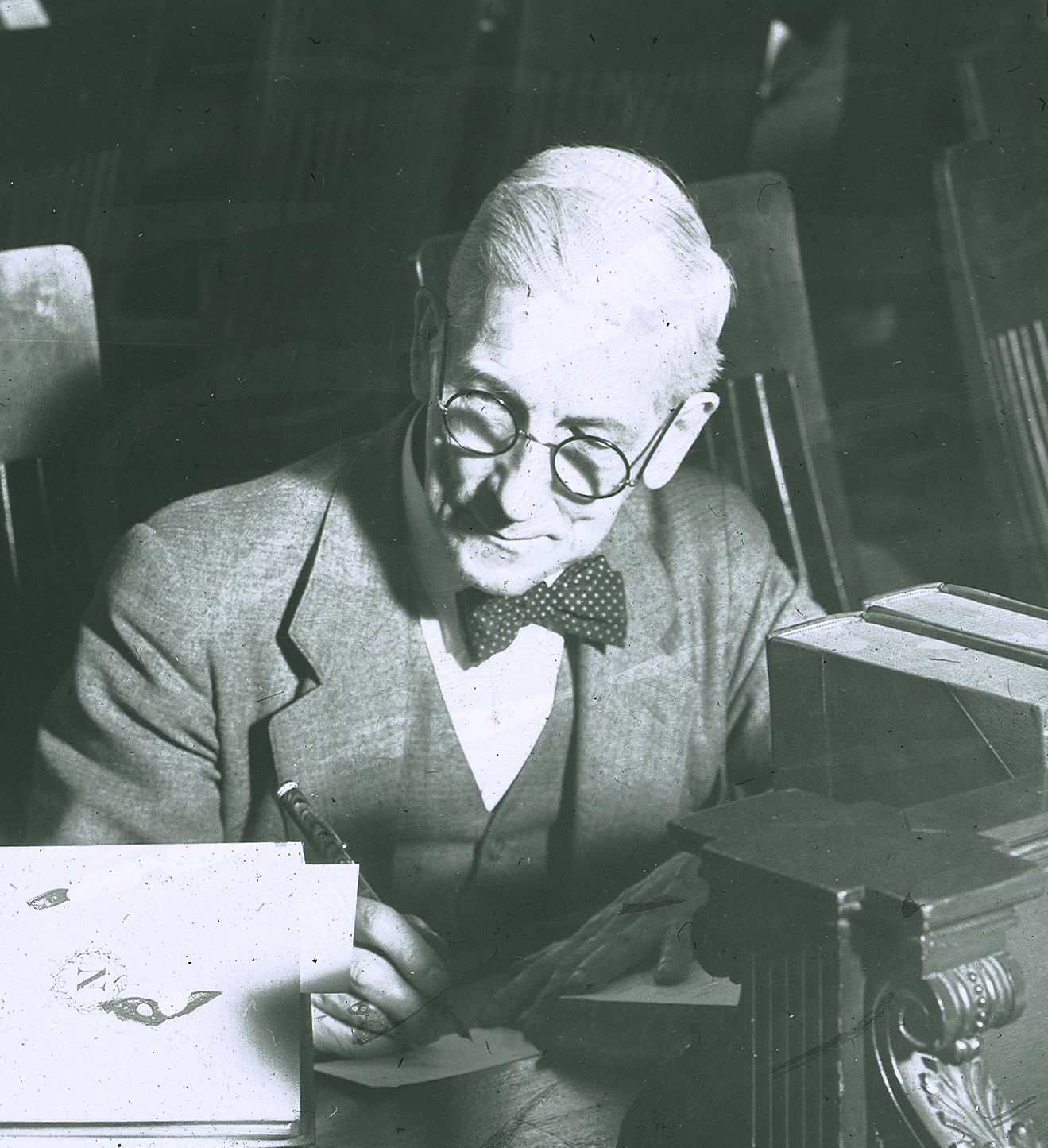
- Born: 5 March 1860; Zurich
- Died: 15 May 1945 (aged 85)
- Occupation: Librarian
- Employer: Library of Congress

Charles Martel (born Karl David Hanke; March 5, 1860 – May 15, 1945) was an American librarian responsible for the creation of the Library of Congress Classification; he is often considered to be one of the most influential librarians in American library history.

== Early life ==
Born in 1860 in Zurich, Switzerland, during Martel's childhood he was surrounded by books, as his father, Franz Hanke, was an antiquarian book dealer in Zurich. By 1872, Martel was studying at the Zurich Gymnasium, where he would continue his studies until 1876. Around the time he ended his studies at the gymnasium, his brother took him on a trip to America to attend the Centennial Exposition in Philadelphia. That same year the American Library Association held its first annual conference, also in Philadelphia, and it has been speculated that Martel may have had his first encounter with the American library system through this conference.

After returning to Switzerland, Martel helped take care of his ailing father, who died in 1878. Following his father's death that same year, Karl moved to the USA and that was the last anyone in his family heard of him. By 1887, he had moved to Dent County, Missouri, where, in April, he became a US citizen under the name of Charles Martel. Following his citizenship, the newly minted Charles Martel moved to Council Bluffs, Iowa, where he worked as an estate manager as well as an assistant to a lawyer.

== Pre-Library of Congress ==
It was in Council Bluffs that Martel would finally find his career. While in Council Bluffs, Martel heard of the Newberry Library in Chicago and by 1892 had gained employment there as an assistant cataloguer under the esteemed librarians Dr. William F. Poole and James C.M. Hanson (1864–1943), whom he would learn from and team up with at the Library of Congress. While at Newberry, Martel was first introduced to Charles Ammi Cutter's Cutter Expansive Classification system (EC) for cataloguing and classifying library resources. In 1893 James Hanson had left but the friendship developed in that single year of working together would be a boon for both of them in the years to come.

Martel continued to work at Newberry until December 1897 when he left for the Library of Congress, which had just finished its move into its new building in Washington, D.C. Before Martel arrived in Washington, Hanson had been hired on from the University of Wisconsin to become the new chief cataloguer of the classification division of the Library of Congress. Given the task of classifying the library's collection by then Head Librarian John Young, Hanson immediately brought in Martel to help in the task.

== Library of Congress ==
Installed in his new position, Martel saw that re-classifying the library's collection was going to be an immense task. The Library of Congress used a cataloguing system developed by Thomas Jefferson that itself was a branch of a system used by Sir Francis Bacon. This system used 44 main categories and within these subject categories, number designations were given that originally meant which book in the category. By the time Martel had arrived in Washington, the numbers meant which shelf the book would be found on.

Work on classifying the library's immense collection of books began in 1899 with Martel becoming a member of a committee formed and headed by Herbert Putnam, the new Head Librarian, following the death of John Young and William Parker Cutter. Putnam sent Martel and Hanson to libraries located across the nation to find a classification system that would work with the collection. In 1899, the Dewey Decimal Classification (DDC) system was the most popular system in the libraries and it was a natural choice for the classifiers, but in an effort to look at all available options, Cutter's Expansive Classification and one developed by the German theologian Otto Hartwig were also examined. Martel quickly ruled out Hartwig's system because it emphasized religion too much, but couldn't decide between Dewey's system and Cutter's. Both systems needed major adjustments in order to be adapted to the Library of Congress' special needs and it ultimately became a matter of who would allow those changes to be made. By the end of 1899, Martel rejected Dewey's system because Melvil Dewey was unwilling to allow the library to make the necessary changes. This began a two-year-long controversy between the two giants of the library as each criticized the other over perceived slights in the decisions about changes needed to adapt the DDC. In the end the only real winner was Charles Ammi Cutter, who agreed to allow Martel and Hanson to make whatever changes they needed to his EC. Unfortunately, Cutter died in 1903 while finishing the final stage of the EC and thus Martel was forced to finish the system as he worked through the library's collection.

The end product was greater than anyone could imagine. The Library of Congress Classification (LC) system drew heavily on various other catalogues then in existence such as the Index Medicus for the medicine section. And as a way to help other libraries use the library's system, Martel and Hanson had the catalogue system printed on cards "since with the printed cards of the Library of Congress a serviceable catalogue can be made with less expenditure of time and labor than by any other method at present available." On October 1, 1912, Charles Martel succeeded his old friend, James C.M. Hanson, who had left in November, 1910.

In 1900, shortly after beginning the work of re-classifying the library's collection, Martel married the widow Emma (McCoy) Haas, who died in 1906 after giving birth to their son, Rennie.

== Vatican Library ==
In the fall of 1927, the Vatican Library, on order of Pope Pius XI, himself the former librarian for the Vatican, and by suggestion of the Carnegie Endowment for International Peace, sent two cataloguers to the Library of Congress as a means of sharing cataloguing information as well as be taught how to create a catalogue for a large collection. Working together with Martel, the two gained enormous insights into the world of cataloguing. When they returned to Rome, the whole adventure was such a resounding success that a mission of cataloguers went to Rome to help them in classifying the archives. The Carnegie Endowment turned to Dr. William Warner Bishop to select and head the team. Turning first to Martel, who quickly rebuffed him, Dr. Bishop was able to persuade James C.M. Hanson to go on the condition that Martel would also be persuaded to attend. Working through Dr. Putnam, Dr. Bishop was able to get Martel's agreement and together with three others, the work began on adapting the LC and the Anglo-American Code of Catalogue Rules to the Vatican's immense collection and archives. Martel was the natural choice to be the head classifier as he had such vast experience dating back nearly 30 years. As they had done with the Library of Congress, Martel and his old friend Hanson worked together to build an enduring system. As one contemporary stated, the two were "greatly influential in drawing up the Vatican Norme, perhaps the best of modern cataloging codes, and one which goes far to reconcile European and American practice."

On September 15, 1929, Charles Martel ended an illustrious career as the Chief Classifier and later Chief of the Catalogue Division at the nation's most prestigious library. He continued to consult though reaching compulsory retirement in 1932 and did not formally retire until just before his death on May 15, 1945.
