= John Cotton Dana =

American librarian and museum director

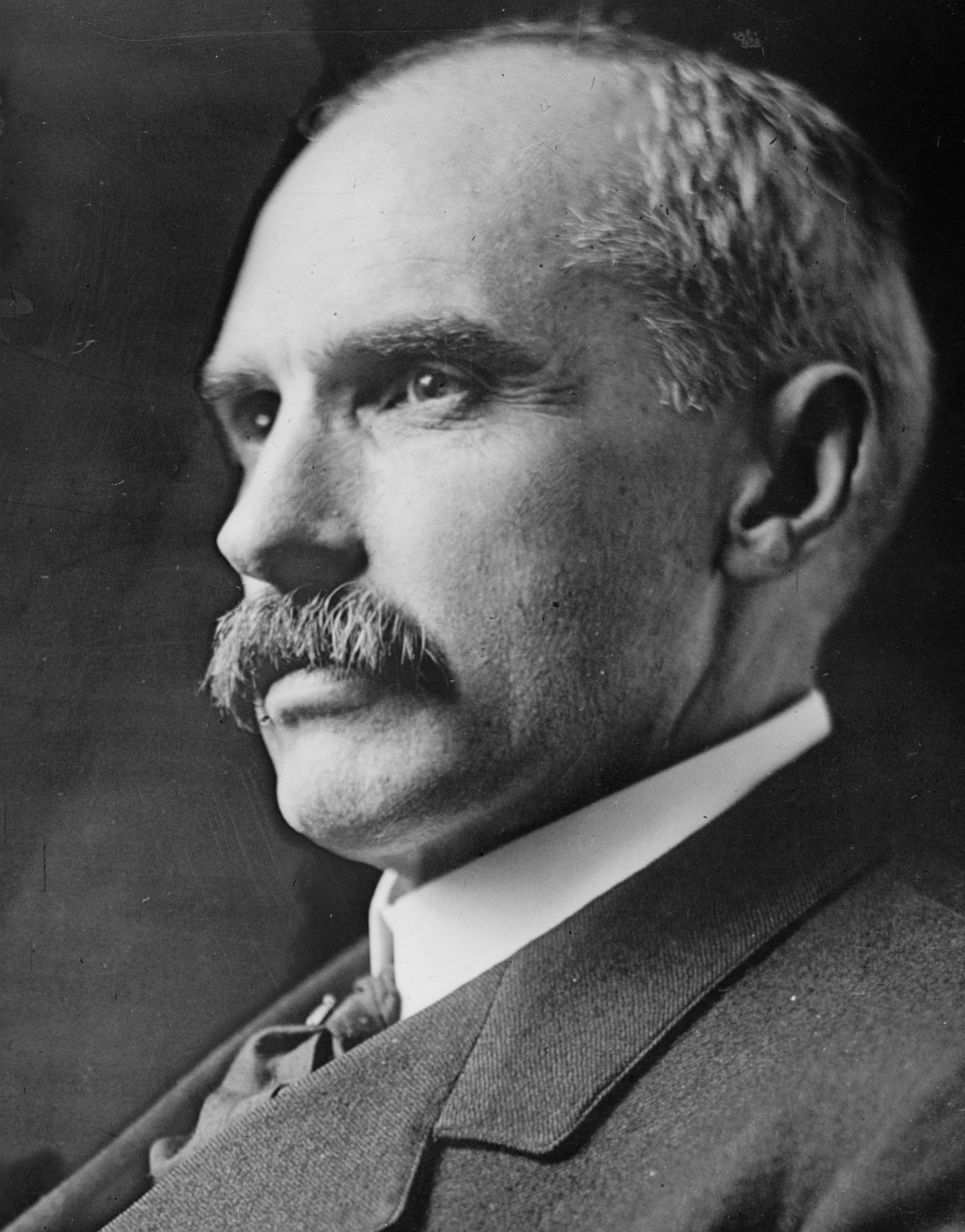

President of the American Library Association
- In office 1895–1896
- Preceded by: Henry Munson Utley
- Succeeded by: William Howard Brett

Personal details
- Born: August 19, 1856 Woodstock, Vermont, United States
- Died: July 21, 1929 (aged 72) Newark, New Jersey, United States
- Spouse: Adine Rowena Wagener (m. 1888)
- Education: Dartmouth College
- Occupation: Librarian
- Known for: Founder of the Newark Museum

John Cotton Dana (August 19, 1856, in Woodstock, Vermont – July 21, 1929, in Newark, New Jersey) was an American library and museum director who sought to make these cultural institutions relevant to the daily lives of citizens. As a public librarian for forty years Dana promoted the benefits of reading, pioneered direct access to shelved materials, and innovated specialized library services of all types.

== Early career ==
Dana studied law at Dartmouth College, where he graduated in 1878. Moving to Denver in 1880, Dana passed the Colorado bar and began to practice. Dana moved to New York and was admitted to the bar in 1883. Taking a position as the editor of the Ashby Avalanche in 1885, Dana moved to Minnesota, but resettled in Colorado after a short time. Dana married in 1888 to Adine Rowena Wagener. They had no children.

Because of the reputation he cultivated as a learned man and his connections in the Denver Public Schools, the superintendent Aaron Gove nominated Dana as the city's first librarian. Dana directed the Denver Public Library from 1889 to 1898, where he instituted an "open stack" policy under which patrons could browse for themselves instead of having library staff intervening for every request. Dana wanted to update libraries and envisioned them as vibrant community centers rather than collections of relics that appealed to only a small segment of people. Under Dana's leadership the Denver Public Library also pioneered the first-ever collection devoted to children's literature. Dana was the president of the Colorado Library Association in 1895 and served as president of the American Library Association in 1895/96.

Dana also drew criticism for circulating "gold bug" literature at the library; Colorado was economically dependent on mining silver and the gold standard was a political issue. Dana felt that library patrons should have information on both sides of the issue.

Back east again, he served as a librarian at the Springfield, Massachusetts, public library from 1898 to 1902 and continued many of his Denver policies there. One of the changes Dana implemented at the Springfield library was to the physical building itself. He had workers tear down many of the railings and generally open the floor plan. Dana was adamant that patrons be permitted to browse the stacks: "Let the shelves be open, and the public admitted to them, and let the open shelves strike the keynote of the whole administration. The whole library should be permeated with a cheerful and accommodating atmosphere."

== Newark Public Library and Museum ==
Dana provided leadership at the Newark Public Library in Newark, New Jersey, from 1902 until his death in 1929. He established foreign language collections for immigrants and also developed a special collection for the business community. This "Business Branch" was the first of its kind in the nation.

Dana founded the Newark Museum in 1909, directing it until his death. The Museum was exceptional because it included contemporary American commercial products as folk art as well as factory-made products. John C. Dana personally believed that purchasing European oil painting was a waste of money and thus supported American art movements. He did not like modern art, but he believed in the principle of a universal museum and thus ordered purchases of art associated with the Ashcan School. In 1915, he curated the exhibition "Clay Products of New Jersey" where he displayed two porcelain toilets from the Trenton Potteries, part of his work toward including industrial arts in the museum. Cotton also began the Newark Museum's notable Tibetan collection.

Dana was quoted as saying, “A great department store, easily reached, open at all hours, is more like a good museum of art than any of the museums we have yet established”. A biographer said of Dana, “He would have found a library school curriculum intolerable, and doubtless a library school would have found him intolerable”.

== Legacy ==
After Dana's death, his successor at the Newark Public Library referred to him as “The First Citizen of Newark”. The pre-legal department of New Jersey Law School, transitioning from a two-year to a four-year curriculum in 1930, renamed the school Dana College (Watkins 2006, 2). Six years after his death, the city of Newark appointed October 6, 1935 as John Cotton Dana Day. Rutgers-Newark's main library, opened in 1967, is named after Dana.

The NJ Associations of Museums has an annual award in his name, presented to an individual "for outstanding contributions to the New Jersey museum profession."

Dana is recognized in the Library Hall of Fame.

Dana's concepts of "access and utility" are viewed as antecedents to information science.

== Selected publications ==
- A Library Primer, 1896.
- The New Museum, by John Cotton Dana. ElmTree Press, Woodstock, Vermont, 1917.
- The Gloom of the Museum, by John Cotton Dana, ElmTree Press, Woodstock, Vermont, 1917.
- Installation of a Speaker, by John Cotton Dana, ElmTree Press, Woodstock, Vermont, 1918.
- A Plan for a New Museum by John Cotton Dana, ElmTree Press, Woodstock, Vermont, 1920.
- American Art: How it can be made to Flourish by John Cotton Dana, ElmTree Press, Woodstock, Vermont, 1929.
- "The Museum as an Art Patron" by John Cotton Dana. Creative Art, March 1929.
- "Art is all in Your Eye" by John Cotton Dana. The Museum, January 1927.
- "In a Changing World Should Museums Change?" by John Cotton Dana. The Museum, September 1926.
- Dana, John Cotton, and Henry W. Kent, eds. Literature of Libraries in the Seventeenth and Eighteenth Centuries. Chicago: A. C. McClure, 1906–07; reissued Metuchen: The Scarecrow Reprint Corporation, 1967.

== Sources ==
- John Cotton Dana: The Centennial Convocation, Rutgers University Press, New Brunswick, New Jersey, 1957.
- Cahill, Edgar Hoger, "The Life and Work of John Cotton Dana". Americana Illustrated, January 1930, volume XXIV, Number 1, pages 69–84, The American Historical Society.
- Duncan, Carol. (2009). A Matter of Class: John Cotton Dana, Progressive Reform, and the Newark Museum. Pittsburgh: Periscope Publishing.
- Grove, Richard. 'Pioneers in American Museums: John Cotton Dana'. Museum News, Volume 56, Number 5, May–June 1978, pages 32–39 & 86–88.
- Hadley, C. (1943). John Cotton Dana: A Sketch. Chicago: American Library Association.
- Hanson, C. A. (Ed.) (1991). Librarian at Large: Selected Writings of John Cotton Dana. Washington DC: Special Libraries Association.
- Johnson, Hazel Alice. 1937. “John Cotton Dana.” Library Quarterly 7 (January): 50–98.
- Maffei, N. (2000). 'John Cotton Dana and the politics of exhibiting industrial art in the US, 1909-1929'. Journal of Design History, Volume 13, Number 4, pages 301–317.
- Mattson, Kevin. 2000. 'The librarian as secular minister to democracy: the life and ideas of John Cotton Dana'. Libraries & Culture. Volume 35, Number 4.
- The Museum, Volume II, Number 10: October 1929, tribute to John Cotton Dana. (Various authors.)
- Watkins, Ann. John Cotton Dana — Newark's First Citizen.

Non-profit organization positions
Preceded by Henry Munson Utley	President of the American Library Association; 1895–1896	Succeeded by William Howard Brett
