= H. Clinton Parrent Jr. =

American architect

- Born: August 6, 1902; Davidson County, Tennessee, U.S.
- Died: September 30, 1967 (aged 65); Belle Meade, Tennessee, U.S.
- Resting place: Mount Olivet Cemetery
- Education: Vanderbilt University; University of Pennsylvania; Rhodes College
- Occupation: Architect
- Spouse: Mary Williamson
- Children: 2 daughters

Henry Clinton Parrent Jr. (August 6, 1902 – September 30, 1967) was an American architect from Tennessee. He designed buildings listed on the National Register of Historic Places in Nashville and Memphis, including the Tennessee State Library and Archives and the Richard Halliburton Memorial Tower on the Rhodes College campus.

== Early life and education ==
Parrent was born on August 6, 1902, in Davidson County, Tennessee. He attended Vanderbilt University, and he earned a bachelor in Fine Arts from the University of Pennsylvania. He earned a doctor of Fine Arts from Rhodes College in 1958.

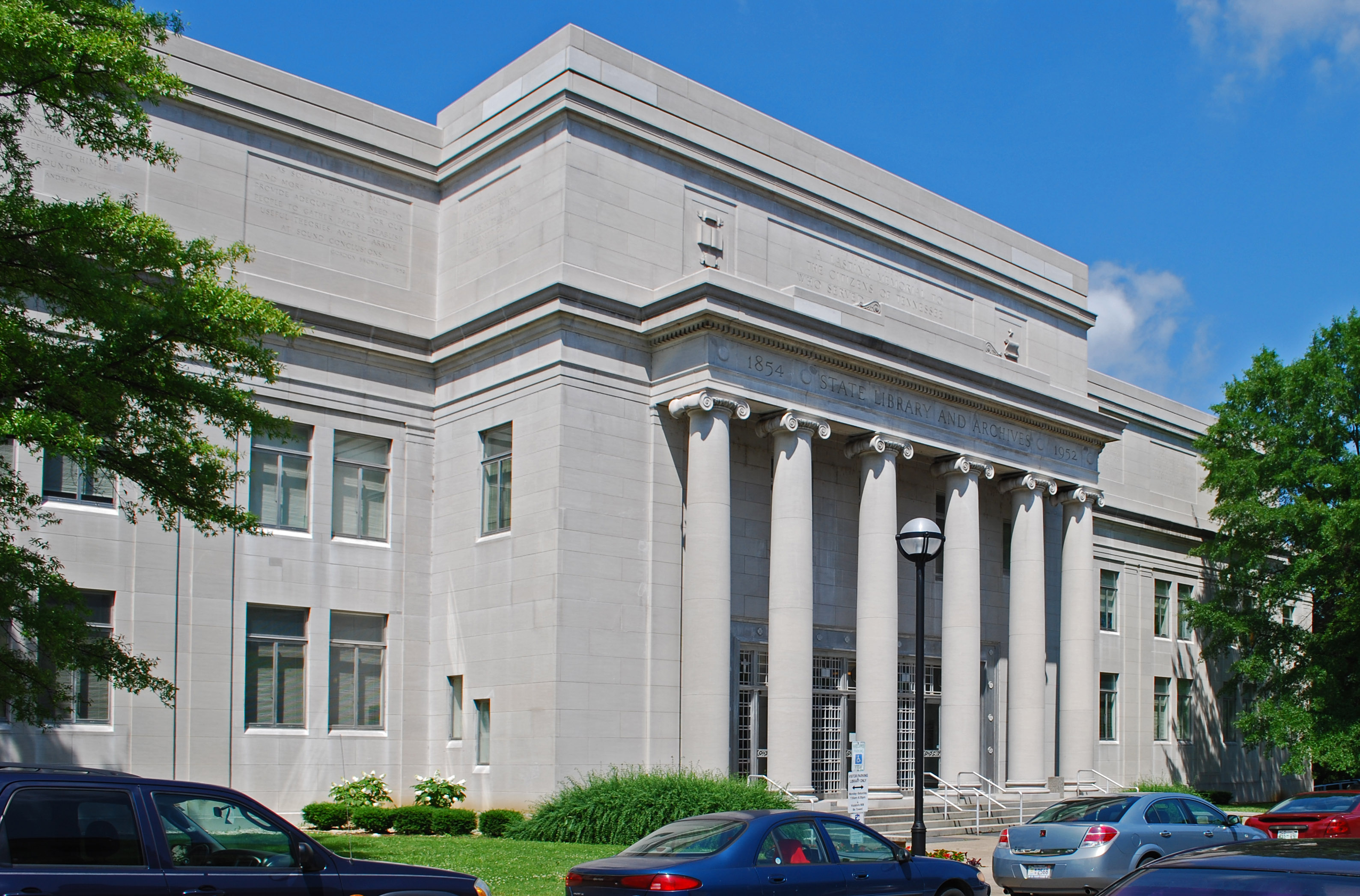
The Tennessee State Library and Archives, designed by Parrent.

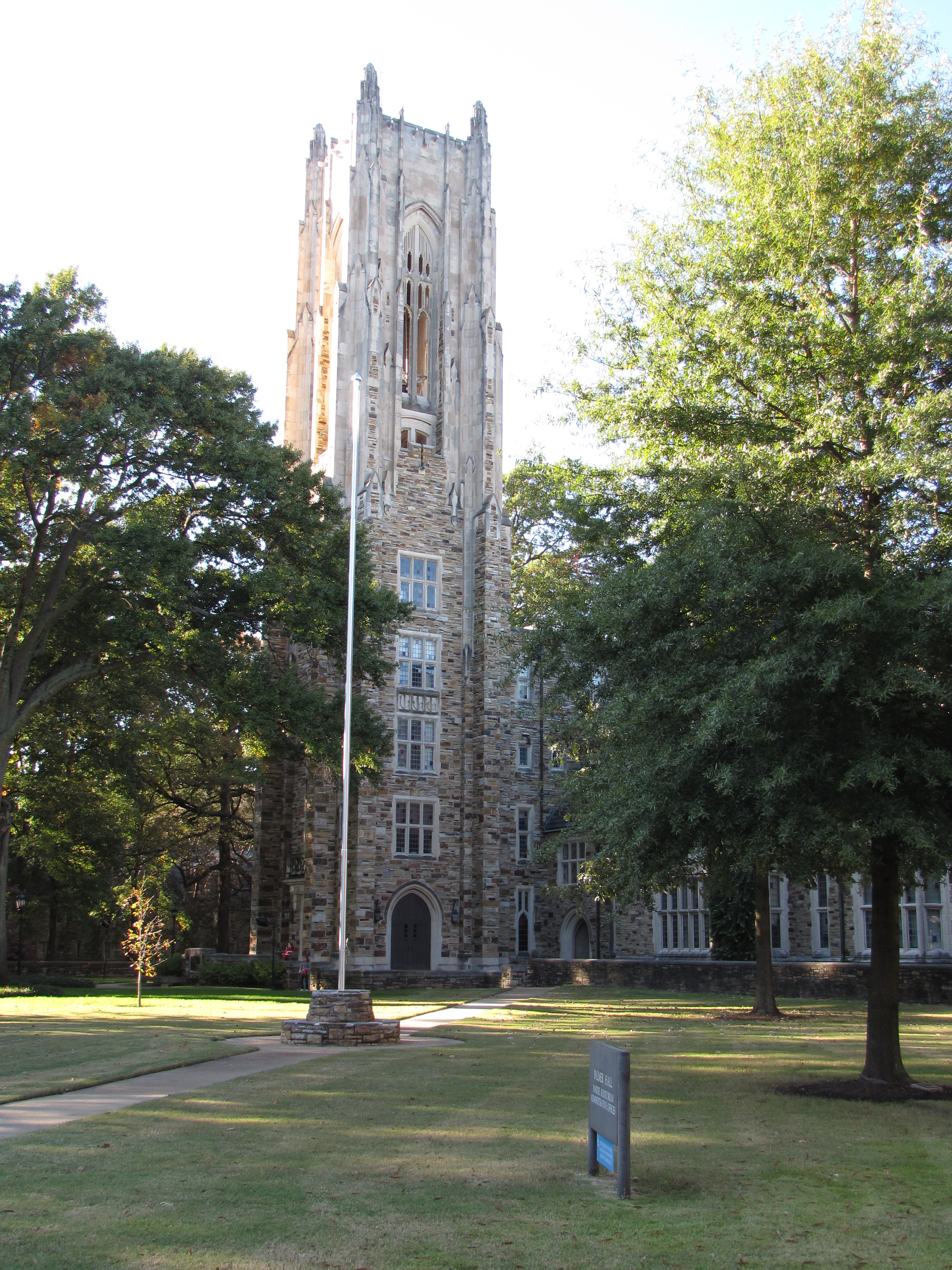
The Halliburton Tower on the Rhodes College campus.

== Career ==
Parrent designed several buildings in Nashville, including the Central State Hospital and the Nashville Electric Service. In 1952, designed the Tennessee State Library and Archives, with a Neoclassical portico. It is listed on the National Register of Historic Places.

Parrent designed several buildings on the campus of Southwestern College (now known as Rhodes College) in Memphis, Tennessee, including the Richard Halliburton Memorial Tower in the Gothic Revival style, completed in 1961. It is listed on the National Register of Historic Places as part of the Southwestern at Memphis Historic District. In Austin, Texas, Parrent designed the Texas Library and Archives.

Parrent served as the president of the Tennessee chapter of the American Institute of Architects.

== Personal life and death ==
Parrent married Mary Williamson, and they had two daughters. They resided at 520 Westview Avenue in Belle Meade, Tennessee, and Parrent was a member of the Belle Meade Country Club.

Parrent died on September 30, 1967, in Belle Meade, at 65. His funeral was held at Westminster Presbyterian Church, and he was buried in the Mount Olivet Cemetery.
