= Josephus Nelson Larned =

American journalist

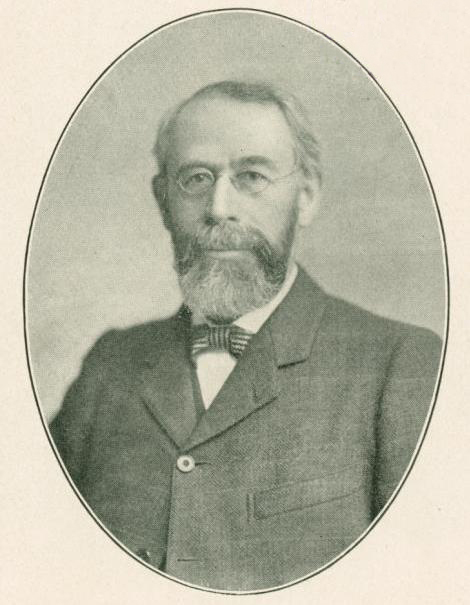

President of the American Library Association
- In office 1893–1894
- Preceded by: Melvil Dewey
- Succeeded by: Henry Munson Utley

Personal details
- Born: May 11, 1836 Chatham, Ontario, Canada
- Died: August 15, 1913 (aged 77) Orchard Park, New York, United States
- Spouse: Frances A. K. McCrea (m. 1861)
- Parents: Henry Sherwood Larned; Mary Ann Nelson
- Occupation: Librarian; writer

Josephus Nelson Larned (May 11, 1836 – August 15, 1913) was an American newspaper editor, author, librarian, and historian. As superintendent of the Young Men's Association Library, he presided over its transformation into what is now the Buffalo & Erie County Public Library.

== Early life ==
Larned was born in Chatham, Ontario, Canada, the son of Henry Sherwood Larned and Mary Ann Nelson. His family moved to Buffalo, New York, when he was twelve and he was educated in public schools there until he was sixteen. After his schooling, he worked as a bookkeeper for a ship chandler and a clerk for two transportation companies. In 1857, he moved west to Iowa, but did not enjoy it there and returned to Buffalo later that year. He was attracted to newspaper work and began working for the Buffalo Republic.

== Buffalo Express ==
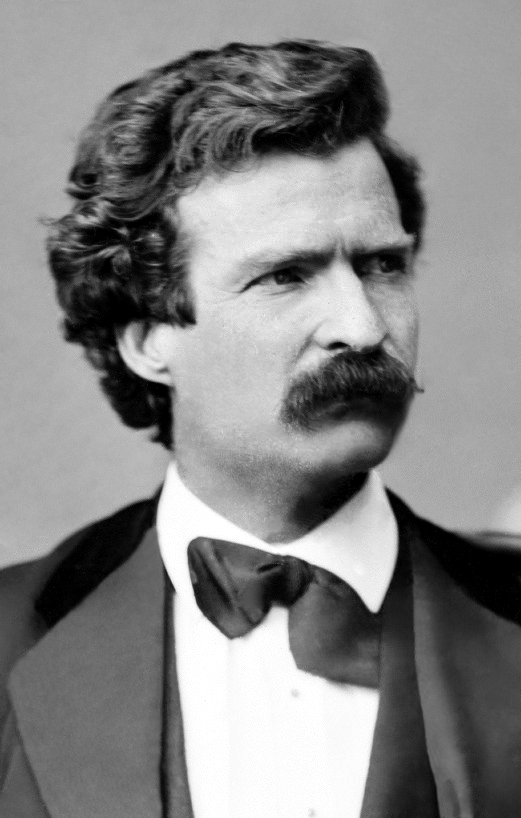
Mark Twain in 1871

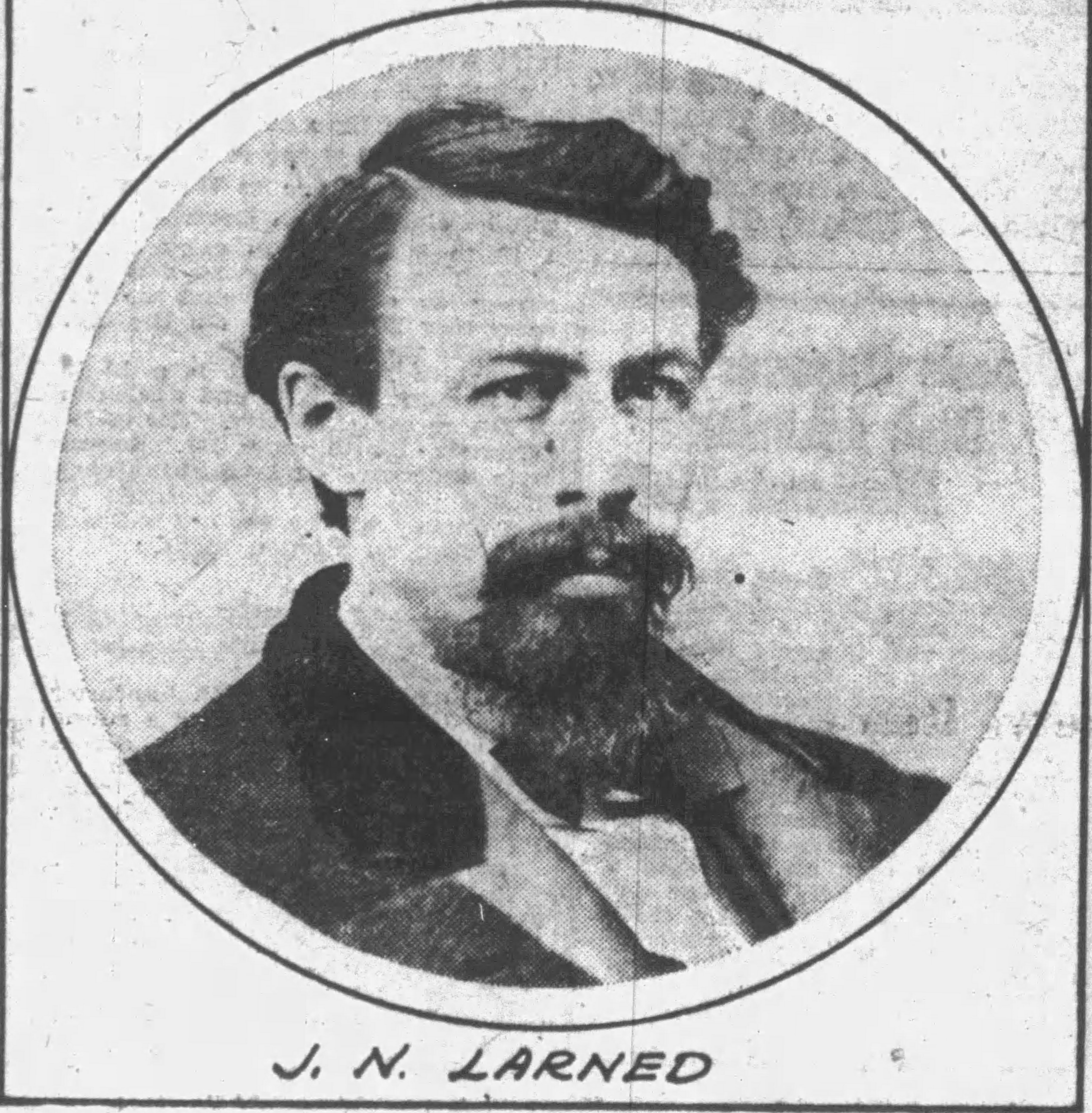
JN Larned c1870

Two years later, in 1859, Larned joined another newspaper, the Buffalo Express, where he worked for the next thirteen years. Starting in 1866, he had a financial interest in the newspaper as well. Larned produced political editorials for the Express and his opinions were generally Republican and pro-Union.

In 1861, Larned married Frances A. K. McCrea and they had three children.

In 1869, author Mark Twain purchased one-third of the Express with $25,000 borrowed from his future father-in-law, Jervis Langdon. Twain wrote for the paper, producing features and editorials mostly on local issues. He was seldom in the newspaper office, remote working or mailing in articles while on lecture tours. When he was there, he smoked ever-present cigars and had a desk opposite Larned. Twain steadfastly avoided writing about politics, leaving the task to Larned, of whom he said "I shall not often meddle with politics because we have a political editor who is already excellent and who only needs a term in the penitentiary to be perfect." On one occasion, Larned was at the state Republican convention, leaving Twain in charge of the Express. The paper reported the names of the nominees but Twain added in the accompanying editorial "comment on the ticket will have to be postponed till the other young man gets home." Twain left the newspaper in 1871 and eventually sold his share at a significant loss.

Larned left the Express in 1872.

== Education and politics ==
Larned was elected Superintendent of Education in Buffalo in 1871 and served two terms. He pressed significant changes, including increased teacher education, availability of technical and vocational training, the teaching of German to serve immigrant populations, and the independence of education from politics. He was unable to make most of his changes and was frustrated with political interference, writing in one of his annual reports "I know of no other important city in the country in which the government of the schools is not separated from the general organization of municipal government and committed to a board of education."

In 1876, he published his first book, Talks About Labor; Concerning the Evolution of Justice Between the Laborers and the Capitalists. That year he also unsuccessfully ran for the Republican nomination for the New York State Assembly's 3rd district.

== The Buffalo Library ==
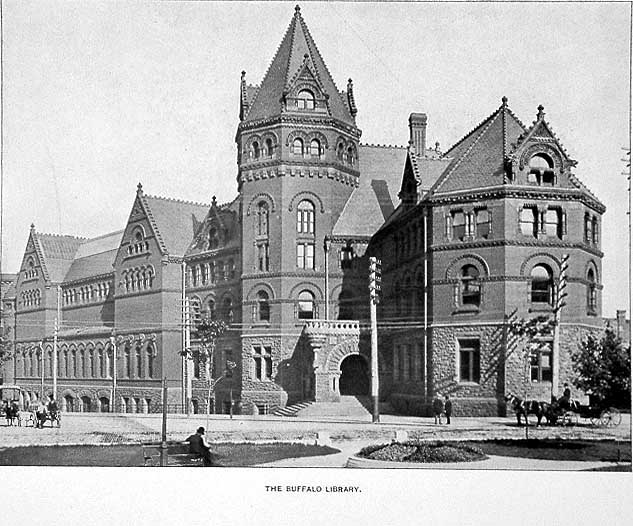
Buffalo Library, designed by Cyrus L. W. Eidlitz and opened in 1887

The Young Men's Association of the City of Buffalo was founded on February 22, 1836 (the year of Larned's birth) "for mutual improvement in literature and science." They soon founded a subscription library. In 1877, Larned was hired as superintendent of the library.

Larned soon discovered that the collection was in desperate need of cataloging and organization, due to the rapid growth of the collection and the fact that the previous catalog was seven years old. Traveling to libraries in the region to research classification systems, he met Melvil Dewey and learned about his new Dewey Decimal System. Larned's library was the first outside Dewey's Amherst College to adopt the system, which is now universal in public libraries in the US. Adopting the new system and presenting his experiences introduced him to other professionals and the new American Library Association, which he later served as president of for the 1893–1894 term. Larned impressed his new colleagues and Dewey later said he was one of the country's best librarians. His interest in cataloging continued. He later developed a system for classifying newspaper clippings and pamphlets and an alternative system for classifying books, but these were not adopted by libraries.

In 1886, to avoid confusion with the Young Men's Christian Association, the institution was renamed the Buffalo Library. The next year, the Library's new building, designed by architect Cyrus L. W. Eidlitz, opened.

Larned was focused on the quality of the collection, advocating standards of quality and against purchasing what he thought were inferior publications, such as "unwholesome newspapers". "Our tools are not books, but good books," he said in an ALA address. He cooperated with other libraries in a system devised by Charles Ammi Cutter to share lists of new books accompanied by quotations from book reviews.

Larned adopted new innovations that made his library more accessible to library patrons. He had open stacks which allowed patrons to browse the collection themselves, prominently displayed new books, organized a lecture series, and opened the library to non-subscribers on Sunday afternoons. He organized a system for providing quick answers to frequently asked reference questions that became the genesis of his book History for Ready Reference (1895). Children were a particular focus of his outreach. He distributed free library tickets to children, opened one of the first library children's rooms in the US in 1896, and compiled a bibliography of children's literature.

Larned's push for accessibility, coupled with a financial crisis for the Library when the Young Men's Association lost a state tax exemption, culminated in 1897 with the Buffalo Library becoming a free public library. Once the library was under the control of the city of Buffalo, however, Larned, who disliked political interference, clashed with the Library Board and soon resigned, to the disappointment of the city and the library profession.

== Retirement ==
Larned had an active retirement after leaving the Buffalo Library, writing, traveling, and lecturing. He continted to be active in librarianship, writing articles for the Library Journal and creating an annotated bibliography of American history, completing it in 1902. He wrote for a series of articles criticizing government corruption and socialism in the Atlantic Monthly and published the two volume history Seventy Centuries of the Life of Mankind (1907). He was active in world peace causes and was the first president of the Buffalo branch of the American Peace Society. He died in Orchard Park, New York in 1913.

== Works ==
- Reiley, Alan Campbell (1901). Larned, Josephus Nelson (ed.). History for Ready Reference: From the Best Historians, Biographers, and Specialists; Their Own Words in a Complete System of History ... Vol. 6 of History for Ready Reference: From the Best Historians, Biographers, and Specialists, Their Own Words in a Complete System of History (revised ed.). C.A. Nichols Company.

Non-profit organization positions
Preceded by Melvil Dewey	President of the American Library Association; 1893–1894	Succeeded by Henry Munson Utley
