= Sears List of Subject Headings =

Controlled vocabulary of bibliographic index terms

The Sears List of Subject Headings is a controlled vocabulary for small to medium sized library collections.

== History ==
The first edition of the Sears List of Subject Headings was published by Minnie Earl Sears in 1923. The list was the result of a survey of nine small libraries which expressed a long felt need for a simpler, broader controlled vocabulary than the Library of Congress Subject Headings intended for small to medium sized library collections. The first edition compiled over 3000 headings from the catalogs of the surveyed libraries. From the outset, the headings were to be derived from and based on the Library of Congress Subject Headings.

Sears died prematurely at age 60 after editing the first three editions. For the 6th edition in 1950, her name was added to the title.

The format remained largely unchanged until the 13th edition in 1986 which was the first created as an electronic database. Among the changes in this edition, headings were changed from inverted form to natural form to match the searching behavior of users in Online Public Access Catalogs (OPACs).

== Usage ==
The Sears List is widely used in small to medium sized public libraries as well as school libraries and media centers in the United States. It is also the standard for school libraries in many Canadian provinces as well as in other English-speaking locales. It's primary advantage over the more popular Library of Congress Subject Headings (LSCH) is its simplicity. Sears has fewer rules and allows for greater flexibility than LCSH. Compared to LCSH, its smaller size, broader headings, and lower expense, are generally sufficient for the needs of libraries and media centers with small collections. However, users of Sears are limited from benefiting from and participating in professional associations, conferences, and training opportunities that are provided by the Library of Congress. Additionally, because most members of online bibliographic networks/consortia don't use Sears, catalogers may need to do more original subject cataloging when records with Library of Congress Subject Headings would be readily available.

== Reception ==
The decision of whether to use Sears or Library of Congress Subject Headings as always been somewhat controversial. Marie Louise Prevost argued in 1952 that even small libraries should start with LC, citing the work needed to "upgrade" form Sears to LCSH, and the argument that "if one has the chance to teach a child how to use a catalog in his formative year, he should have the vision and the wisdom to show him the real thing." In 2004, a self-described, though widely cited, "unscientific survey" of catalogers by Jean Weihs in 2004, reported that many school librarians did not know the difference between Sears and LCSH, or which one their library actually used.

The Sears List has received only limited academic study in comparison with LCSH.
