= William E. Foster =

American librarian and author (1851–1930)

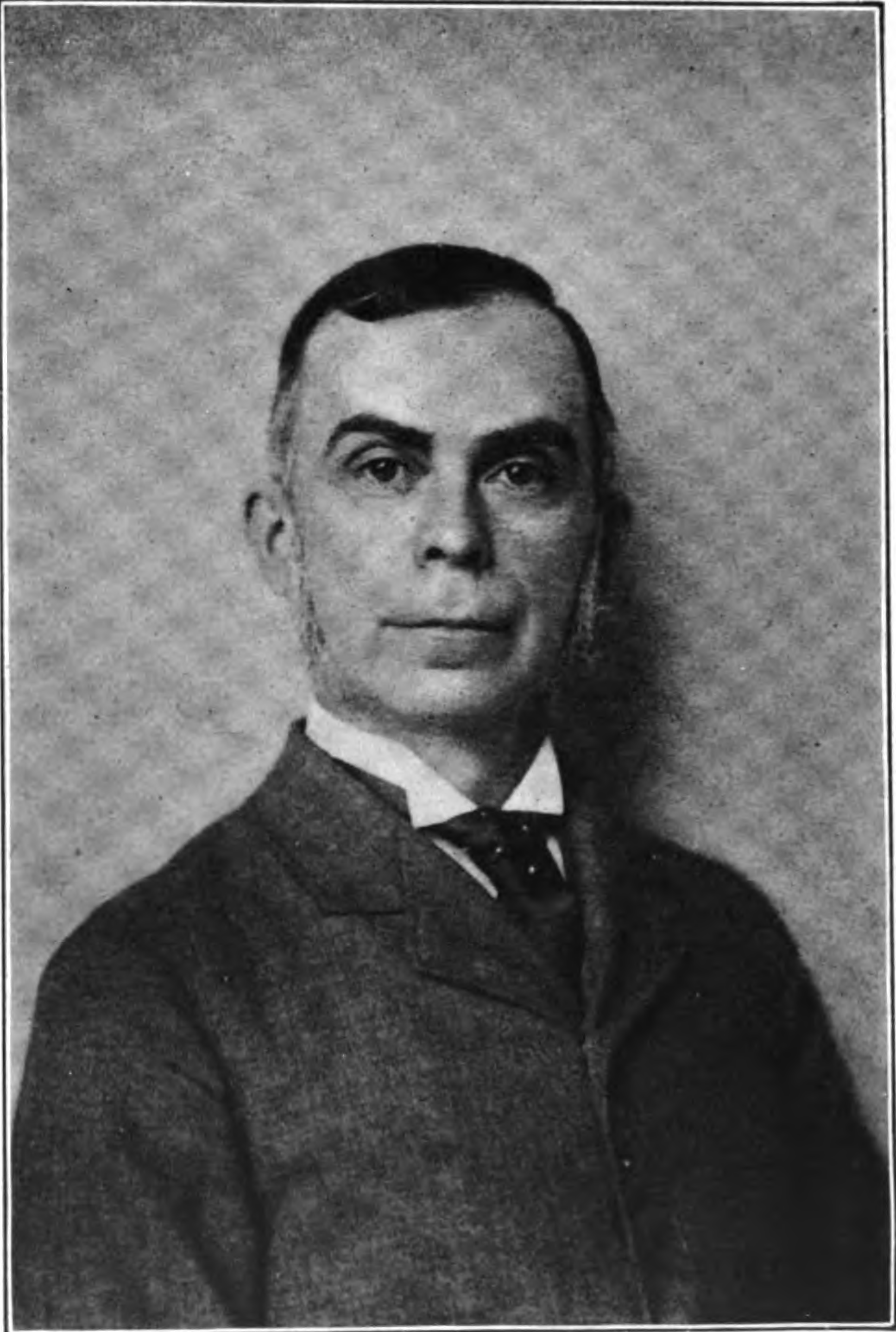
- Born: June 2, 1851; Brattleboro
- Died: September 10, 1930 (aged 79)
- Alma mater: Brown University
- Occupation: Librarian

William Eaton Foster (June 2, 1851 – September 10, 1930) was an American librarian and author.

== Biography ==
He was born on June 2, 1851, in Brattleboro, Vermont, to Joseph and Abigail Eaton Foster and raised in Beverly, Massachusetts. He graduated from Brown University in 1876 and went to work as a librarian in the Hyde Park, Massachusetts Public Library. Foster went on to work as a cataloger for the Turner Free Library in Randolph, Massachusetts, and also worked part-time for the Boston Public Library.

Foster attended the "Convention of Librarians" held during the 1876 Centennial International Exhibition in Philadelphia which is when the American Library Association was formed.

He returned to Providence, Rhode Island, in 1877 to assist in opening the Providence Public Library and served as its Director until his retirement in 1930. During his tenure in Providence, Foster wrote numerous articles for the Providence Journal to promote the library. He also gave lectures to various groups around the city and published books on a variety of subjects.

In February 1891, he addressed the annual meeting of the Rhode Island Society of the Sons of the American Revolution which he joined as a charter member when it was founded the previous year.

Foster retired from the Providence Public Library after 53 years of service in February 1930 due to illness. He died on September 10, 1930, aged 79, after a long illness. He was survived by his wife of 44 years, Julia Appleton Foster.

== Awards and honors ==
- Elected a member of the American Antiquarian Society in 1889.
- Honorary Doctorate in Literature from Brown University (1901)
- honorary membership to the Rhode Island School of Design (1930)
- The title “Librarian Emeritus for life” was bestowed on him by the library trustees
- Library Hall of Fame (1957)

== Publications ==
- The Civil Service Movement (1881)
- Libraries and Readers (1883)
- Stephen Hopkins: A Rhode Island Statesman (1884)
- Town Government in Rhode Island (1886)
- The Point of View in History (1906)
- How to Choose Editions (1912)
- The First Fifty Years of the Providence Public Library (1928)
