= Sydney B. Mitchell =

Canadian librarian, teacher and gardener

Sydney Bancroft Mitchell
- Born: June 24, 1878 Montreal, Quebec, Canada
- Died: September 22, 1951 (aged 73)
- Occupation: Librarian, teacher, gardener

Sydney Bancroft Mitchell (June 24, 1878 – September 22, 1951) was a Canadian librarian, teacher and gardener, though he spent most of his career in the United States. He was named one of the one hundred most important leaders in Library Science by the American Libraries journal in 1999.

Sydney Mitchell was much more than a librarian and more than the founder of one of the first Masters in Library Science degree programs in the early part of the twentieth century. His love of his hobby, gardening, motivated him to advocate the importance of not focusing only on one's career. He is remembered in the field of horticulture just as much as in the profession of librarianship.

== Biography ==
=== Early life ===
Mitchell was born in Montreal, Quebec, Canada in 1878. His degrees included a Bachelor of Arts and a master's degree in literature from McGill University. He received an honorary Doctor of Literature degree from Occidental College. He studied Library Science at the New York State Library School.

Mitchell remained fluent in both French and English, having spent his boyhood in a predominantly French Canadian neighbourhood. Mitchell's boyhood is discussed in great detail in his memoirs, which unfinished at his death, was published posthumously by his wife and his close personal friend, Lawrence Clark Powell, who wrote the preface.

His memoir features stories of the neighborhood and fellow playmates, vividly describing the life of a normal boy in the streets of the nonindustrial age (born 1878) and fail to describe the difficulties that might have haunted him, having been born with a physical disability which at times caused him to spend long periods of time hospitalized and be categorized as crippled. Reportedly, never dropping into a self-pitying mode, he did not appear to have ever have seen himself as disabled.

=== Library career ===
Among his accomplishments was holding both the Presidency of the California Library Association (1938–1939) and the California Horticultural Society (1933–1945). During those early years in the development of the first master's degree in librarianship at the University of California, Berkeley, it is estimated that he earned more income from practice of his hobby and authoring of several volumes on the topic, than he did in his prestigious university appointment in librarianship.

Mitchell began his work in California at Stanford University. He moved to the University of California, Berkeley in 1911 to head the purchasing department for the University Library. During World War I he was acting librarian at the university. In 1924, he was named department chair, the first director for that department. Three years later he was named director of the School of Librarianship. He served in that capacity where, in 1926, he founded the nation's third graduate program in library science west of the Mississippi. He was named dean of the university in 1944 and held the office until his retirement two years later.

He served as advisory editor to The Library Quarterly journal, Executive board member of the American Library Association, Vice President of the California Library Association, President of the Association of Library Schools and Fellow of the American Library Institute.

Much writing about Sydney Mitchell points to his humanitarian efforts with regard to students and fellow library organizations. It appears he maintained a somewhat open door policy with profound ability to remember his students in regard to both their academic and personality profiles. His advice was frequently sought and followed to individual success by both those planning their careers and those who sought individuals to fill library positions.

While Mitchell appeared to have comfortable relations with all those he encountered, one rivalry was significant. When Mitchell came to work at Berkeley after having spent three years in a library administrative position, his supervisor, Harold Leupp, was too close in age and credentials to assume a mentorship or successive opportunity. The conflict brings Mitchell to the point where he determines to carve out his own path with the university through his interest and dedication to the idea of improving the education and professionalism of the field.

Mitchell was successful in obtaining University Regent approval for establishment of Librarianship in postgraduate study. Previously undergraduate classes and offerings at public libraries had been the practice. In 1926 Mitchell proceeded to create a certification for one year's study in the basics of librarianship and a master's degree for second year study which focused on different types of libraries and one's specialized interests.

Although he had achieved the first stages of his goal, in a setting he has come to love, he was attracted by an offer from the University of Michigan, which was initiated due to his growing reputation of respect and esteem from fellow academic librarians. Taking a sabbatical from his California home, he obtained the tools necessary to further distinguish himself and provide the winning hand in a bid for an increased prestigious position with the west-coast university. He returned the following year, 1927, with permanent appointment as Director of the School of Librarianship at Berkeley where he remained until his retirement in 1945.

=== Family and horticultural interests ===
His San Francisco Bay Area home and esteemed gardens served as a backdrop for frequent visitors to the three acre home shared with his lifelong love and wife, Rose Michael, also a native of Quebec and a librarian in practice .

A lifelong love of the Iris flower, in addition to his presidency with the California Horticultural Society, provided him the editorship of Sunset and authorship of four books on gardening. Mitchell helped organize the American Iris Society, whose Sydney B. Mitchell Medal, the highest award for Pacific Coast irises, is named for him,) and the American Fuchsia Society.

While his physical appearance might have caused initial surprise, due to a somewhat frumpy wardrobe and unique gait, accounts of his great compassion and interest in others, his broad awareness of the world beyond the borders of his home and work, and his ability to see all sides of argument and decision made him one whose physical appearance was quickly forgotten when engaged in entertaining conversation.

He died at home on September 22, 1951.

== Books ==
- Gardening in California; A Guide for the Amateur on the Pacific Slope (Doubleday, Page & Company, 1923)
- Adventures in flower gardening (American Library Association, 1928)
- From a Sunset Garden (Doubleday, Doran & Company, 1932)
- Your California Garden and Mine (M. Barrows and Company, 1947)
- Iris for Every Garden (Barrows, 1949)
- Mitchell of California: the memoirs of Sydney B. Mitchell, librarian, teacher, gardener (California Library Association, 1960)
