= Database of Recorded American Music =

Streaming library

The Database of Recorded American Music (DRAM) is an online resource providing streaming media access to musical works from 26 independent record labels, along with their liner notes, album art, and other related materials.

== History ==
The database began as a project of New World Records, Inc. a not-for-profit recording label which has successfully maintained its distinctive mission for more than thirty years: to actively document and disseminate the work of American composers, selected solely based on artistic merit. Neglected by the commercial recording industry, whose primary motivation is to minimize risk to the profit margin, these are important compositions that would otherwise be seldom heard and narrowly accessible for listening or study. However, through DRAM, students, faculty and scholars affiliated with subscribing universities are able to access the database and use the system as frequently as they wish without charge.

In 2006, the parent company of DRAM and New World Records modified its name from Recorded Anthology of American Music, Inc. (RAAM) to Anthology of Recorded Music, Inc. (ARM) and charter in order to allow works from non-American composers to be included in DRAM. Though New World Records remains exclusively dedicated to the American composer, DRAM's mission has expanded to include content from foreign sources and composers, so long as it satisfies the curatorial requirements of the collection.

All materials are keyword-searchable using any number of criteria, including composer, performer, date of publication, Library of Congress Classification and label of origin. DRAM facilitates the use of music in research for students and faculty across 90 campuses and gives scholarship philosophical priority in its approach to both collection development and intellectual property.
