= Frederick M. Crunden =

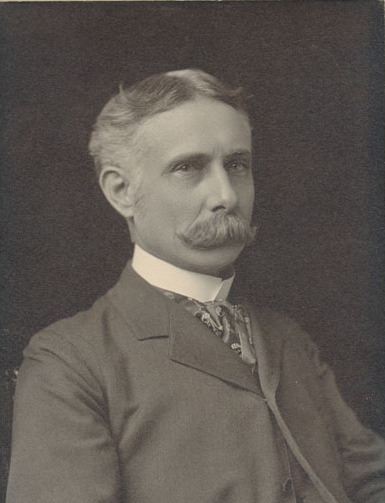

President of the American Library Association
- In office 1887–1889
- Preceded by: Charles Ammi Cutter
- Succeeded by: Melvil Dewey

Personal details
- Born: Frederick Morgan Crunden; September 1, 1847 Gravesend, Kent, England
- Died: October 28, 1911 (aged 64) United States
- Education: Washington University in St. Louis
- Occupation: Librarian

Frederick Morgan Crunden (September 1, 1847 – October 28, 1911) was the head librarian of the St. Louis Public Library in St. Louis, Missouri, from 1877 to 1909 and the president of the American Library Association in 1887–1889. Crunden was born in Gravesend, England to Benjamin and Mary (Morgan) Crunden.

The family immigrated to the United States and settled in St. Louis, Missouri, when Crunden was still a child. He attended Washington University in St. Louis, graduating in 1868 with a Bachelor of Arts. Crunden taught in St. Louis public schools and at Washington University in St. Louis where he received a master's degree in 1872. In January 1877 he became secretary and librarian of the St. Louis Public Library which was, at the time, part of the St. Louis Public Schools. In 1904, Crunden hosted the American Library Association annual meeting at the Louisiana Purchase Exposition in St. Louis, which was attended by more than 500 librarians from 17 countries.

Crunden focused on the relationship of schools and libraries, developing them in St. Louis so that they were modeled for others nationwide. He advocated and promoted a strong partnership between the National Education Association and the American Library Association. Crunden led an expansion of the St. Louis public schools library and oversaw its conversion into a free public library. He served as the first president of the Missouri state library association.

== Publications ==
- The new novel problem and its solution (1899)
- The Free Public Library, Its Uses and Value (1893)

Non-profit organization positions
Preceded by Charles Ammi Cutter	President of the American Library Association; 1887–1889	Succeeded by Melvil Dewey
