= J. C. M. Hanson =

Norwegian-American librarian

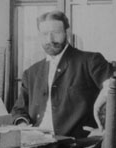
- Born: Jens Christian Meinich Hanson; March 13, 1864; Oppland, Norway
- Died: November 8, 1943 (aged 79); Green Bay, Wisconsin, U.S.
- Occupation: Librarian
- Spouse: Sarah (Nelson) Hanson
- Children: 5
- Parents: Gunnerius "Gunnar" Hanson; Eleonore Adamine (Röberg) Hansen

James Christian Meinich Hanson (March 13, 1864 – November 8, 1943) was a Norwegian born, American librarian.

== Background ==
Jens Christian Meinich Hanson, now known as J. C. M. Hanson, was born on March 13, 1864, in Oppland, Norway, in the Nordre Aurdal district at Sørheim. He was the sixth child and second son of Gunnerius "Gunnar" and Eleonore Adamine (Röberg) Hansen. His first name was initially Jens, but in America, his playmates called him Jim, which was then turned into James, a change that he subsequently used. The change in the spelling of his name was incremental and inconsistent, but by 1897 he'd adopted the signature "J. C. M. Hanson" that he is known by today. Hanson's father was a government employee and a landlord, but his family was big and profitable prospects in Norway were hard to come by.

== Education ==
Hanson's mother's half-brother Han Roberg, who had settled in Decorah, Iowa, offered education to one of the boys of her family, and nine-year-old Jens was selected. He graduated in 1882 from Luther College in Decorah, with a Bachelor of Arts degree. Two years at Concordia Seminary in St. Louis, Missouri, came after this, but Hanson was not drawn to the ministry. Rather he relocated to Chicago, where for four years he taught at a religious academy and a night academy for adult immigrants. In 1888, he enrolled as a graduate student in history at Cornell University in Ithaca, New York. Lack of finances forced him to drop out after two years, and in 1890, he joined the workforce of the newly organized Newberry Library in Chicago. Then he received his first training in librarianship under William Frederick Poole and his staff.

== Career ==
In 1893, Hanson became the head cataloguer at the University of Wisconsin Library. Three years after, in September 1897, Hanson was called to the Library of Congress in Washington, D.C., as chief of its cataloging division.

The library was set to move into its new structure. Its catalogs were only partially complete and not consistently precise; the existing classification scheme was unacceptably outgrown. Hanson took over a full bibliographic reorganization. This task, begun during the short authority of John Russell Young as Librarian of Congress and finalized under his successor, Herbert Putnam, involved the constructing of a new classification system for the library's volumes and the invention of a new roster. Hanson always credited Charles Martel, his apprentice, and successor, as the "chief architect" of the new classification, but the concept and the notation elected were Hanson's.

He decided to build the new catalog in card (rather than book) fashion; the size he selected for the cards has since become the standard in libraries all over the world. The catalog was to be arranged on the dictionary principle (distinct entries in a single alphabetical order). In applying this principle to a collection of similar unaccustomed size and complexity, however, Hanson created numerous expansions which were incorporated into the cataloging regulations. In the subject element of the catalog, he introduced significant variations of the dictionary principle that are still shown in the globally used list of Library of Congress subject headings.

When Putnam began the act of printing and separating carbons of Library of Congress catalog cards to other libraries, it was Hanson who arranged their content and configuration to make them of utmost use. The standardization in cataloging made attainable by these cards practically revolutionized the bibliographical organization of American libraries.

Hanson also supplied vital leadership in the working out of a steady code for library cataloging. In 1900, the American Library Association organized a committee for this reason, with Hanson as head chairman. Through widespread correspondence and consultation with other librarians, he was successful in coordinating universally distinct views. In 1904, when the code was close to complete, the committee was authorized to arrange a collaborative code with the Library Association of Great Britain.

Hanson's diplomacy, along with his broad knowledge of European as well as American library practices, brought consensus on an Anglo-American cataloging code, published in 1908 as Catalog Rules, author, and Title Entries.

In 1910, Hanson relocated to the University of Chicago as associate director of its libraries, which he reorganized to attain bibliographical regulation in a greatly decentralized network. When the Graduate Library School was established at the University of Chicago in 1928, he was hired as a professor there. At the same time, he traveled to Italy, where he led a team of American experts who aided in the reorganization of the Vatican Library in Rome. After his return to Chicago, he instructed until his retirement in 1934, when he went on to live in his late-summer home at Sister Bay, Wisconsin.

Hanson was appointed the Crown of Norway in 1928 as Commander of the Order of St. Olav. He was also awarded the Doctor of Laws honorary degree from Luther College on June 3, 1931, to highlight his accomplishments. Hanson was a member of the Bibliographical Society of America, the American Library Association (ALA), Kappa Sigma, and the Quadrangle, Norske and University organizations.

Hanson died in Green Bay, Wisconsin, in 1943 of peritonitis from a perforated Duodenal Ulcer. He is entombed in the Lutheran cemetery at Ellison Bay, Wisconsin.

== Publications ==
- Catalog rules : author and title entries (American Library Association, 1908)
- A comparative study of cataloging rules based on the Anglo-American code of 1908 (University of Chicago Press, 1939)
- A Norwegian bibliographer and his latest work. Papers of the Bibliographical Society of America, v.20, pt.1–2 (1926) p. 98–102
- The history of the university library of Christiania, 1811–1911. Papers of the Bibliographical Society of America, v.7, no. 1-2 ( 1912–13) p. 51–68
- The Anglo-American agreement on cataloging rules and its bearing on international cooperation in cataloging of books (Imprimeur des Académies de Belgique, 1908)
