= Robert Croneberger =

Robert Bruce Croneberger Jr.
- Born: January 19, 1937; Pottsville, Pennsylvania, U.S.
- Died: February 27, 1998 (aged 61)
- Education: Lehigh University, University of Pennsylvania, Drexel Institute of Technology
- Occupation: Librarian

Robert Bruce Croneberger Jr. (January 19, 1937 – February 27, 1998) was an American librarian named in American Libraries' December 1999 article "100 of the Most Important Leaders We Had in the 20th Century".

== Biography ==
Robert Croneberger was born to Robert and Ethel Croneberger in Pottsville, Pennsylvania. He attended Lehigh University, where he earned a bachelor's degree in classical languages in 1958. In 1961, he earned a master's degree in the same major from the University of Pennsylvania. Within a year, Croneberger shifted gears and earned a master's degree in library science from Drexel Institute of Technology in 1962.

Upon graduation, Croneberger went to work at the Library of Congress until 1968, where he served in various roles including executive assistant, assistant chief of the Card Division and assistant chief of the Serial Record Division. In 1969, he moved to Detroit where he served as deputy director of the Detroit Public Library until 1975. His next move was to the Memphis-Shelby County Public Library as director until 1985. For a brief period of time, he served as Tennessee's state librarian. In 1986, he left that position to serve as director of Carnegie Library of Pittsburgh, where he worked until his death.

Throughout his career, Croneberger was also very active with the American Library Association, serving on its council from 1984 to 1987. He also chaired its accreditation committee for three terms. Until his death, he served as a member of the organization's legislative committee.

Croneberger was also credited with assisting in the rebirth of the Urban Library Council in 1992. At the time of his death, he served as its chair.

== Work ==
=== Detroit Public Library years ===
During his time at the Detroit Public Library, Croneberger wrote of three experiments the library was conducting in the realm of information services. One represented a traditional approach where librarians at the main branch of the library system contacted local organizations and maintained pertinent information in a card file. For the second one, the library collaborated with the city government. Calling it a "little city hall", the library would offer some of the services provided by city government on a neighborhood level. The third experiment centered on a concept known as a community knowledge center. The idea relied on the collaboration of the library community agencies with graduate sociology students. Students would study the community and provide the library with their findings. The experiments laid the foundation for the creation of the Information Place, the library's information and referral service that still exists today.

Croneberger's work led to him being considered one of the founders of the information and referral movement. He went on to become chairman of the Information and Referral Taskforce of the National Commission on Library and Information Science.

=== The Memphis years ===
Croneberger arrived at Memphis and Shelby County Library system in 1975, a year before the city passed an ordinance that banned destroying or damaging library books. In 1980, he was the director when the first person was arrested for violating the ordinance. Lily Prymus was arrested in October 1980 after she did not show up in court in response to a summons. She was charged with not returning 13 books.

=== The Carnegie Library of Pittsburgh years ===
In 1986, Croneberger began his 11-year stint as the eighth director of the Carnegie Library of Pittsburgh.

He brought his passion for the community and information and referral services with him by forming a partnership with the United Way of Allegheny County. Another partnership was formed with the Pittsburgh Mediation Center, which focused on conflict resolution. Public housing projects also became the recipients of library services under his lead.

While at Carnegie, Croneberger also played a critical role in the fundraising and development efforts leading to the creation of the Electronic Information Network. The $10 million Internet project partnered Carnegie with other libraries in Allegheny County.

Another pet project of Croneberger's was the Oakland Library Consortium, where the library joined forces with the University of Pittsburgh and Carnegie Mellon University.

=== Challenge to the Communications Decency Act of 1996 ===
On March 22, 1996, Croneberger found himself testifying as an expert witness for the American Library Association in the case of Reno v. ACLU et al. The ACLU joined with a group of organizations combating the Communications Decency Act which had been signed into law on February 8, 1996, by former President Bill Clinton. In his testimony, Croneberger informed the three-judge panel that adhering to the recently passed law would require an extensive amount of manpower and labor to scour his library's entire collection. Furthermore, he demonstrated to the court how various research topics such as gardening would be affected if all references to sex were removed from the library.

On June 11, the three-judge panel deemed the act unconstitutional, citing Croneberger's testimony three times in its decision.
