= Minnie Earl Sears =

American librarian (1873–1933)

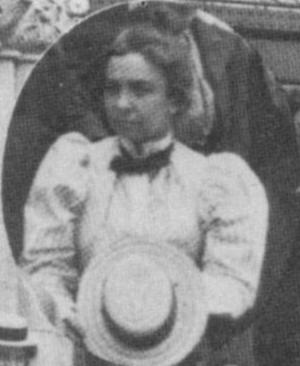
- Sears in 1900
- Born: November 17, 1873; Lafayette, Indiana, U.S.
- Died: November 28, 1933 (aged 60); New York City, U.S.
- Occupation: Librarian

Minnie Earl Sears (November 17, 1873 – November 28, 1933) formulated the Sears List of Subject Headings, a simplification of the Library of Congress Subject Headings. In 1999, American Libraries named her one of the "100 Most Important Leaders We Had in the 20th Century".

== Life and work ==
Sears was a native of Lafayette, Indiana, and was awarded a B.Sc. from Purdue University at age 18, the youngest graduate in her class. She received an M.Sc in 1893. In 1900 the University of Illinois awarded to her a Bachelor of Library Science degree.

Sears had a long career as a cataloguer and bibliographer at a variety of libraries (Bryn Mawr College, University of Minnesota, New York Public Library), before she joined the publishing company H. W. Wilson Company in 1923 to publish her List of Subject Headings for Small Libraries. The book provides a list of subject headings for small libraries to use in lieu of Library of Congress Subject Headings. Library of Congress headings are often not as useful for small libraries because they are too detailed. Sears's List of Subject Headings also offers small libraries guidance on how to create their own new subject headings consistently when necessary.

In order to create her subject headings, Sears consulted small and medium-sized libraries throughout the country to discern patterns of usage. She then developed her own system, based in part on the Library of Congress Subject Headings, but with a simplified subject vocabulary. In Sears's system, common terms are much preferred over scientific and technical terms. Her system also allowed individual libraries the authority to create their own subject headings. The Sears model is not meant to serve as a standardized bridge for union catalogs, but rather as a model "for the creation of headings as needed".

Like the Library of Congress Subject Headings, Sears's system is a subject list arranged in alphabetical order, making use of overarching subject categories and hierarchical subject subdivisions. However, Sears's headings favor natural language. Her headings make use of only four types of headings: topical, form, geographic, and proper names. She also tended to convert inverted headings into direct entries.

In the third edition of the book (1933), Sears added a section called, "Practical Suggestions for the Beginner in Subject Heading Work". These "Principles of the Sears List" were eventually published as a separate document and became a widely used teaching tool for library schools. In subsequent editions, Sears's subject headings have also been linked to appropriate Dewey Decimal Classification numbers.

In addition to creating the List, Sears edited the Standard Catalog for Public Libraries of the American Library Association, and an edition of the Standard Catalog for High School Libraries. She eventually left H.W. Wilson to teach at the Columbia University School of Library Service, where she started the first graduate degree course in cataloging. Sears also remained an active participant in the American Library Association and the New York Library Association. American Libraries names one contribution she is best known for as Essay and General Literature Index, of which she was co-editor from 1931 to 1933. After her death in 1933 at the age of 60, the book was eventually renamed in her honor to the Sears List of Subject Headings.

In 2018, Grey House Publishing purchased the Sears List from EBSCO. The 23rd edition of the Sears List of Subject Headings was published in print and through an online database in 2022.
