= Charles Ammi Cutter =

American librarian (1837–1903)

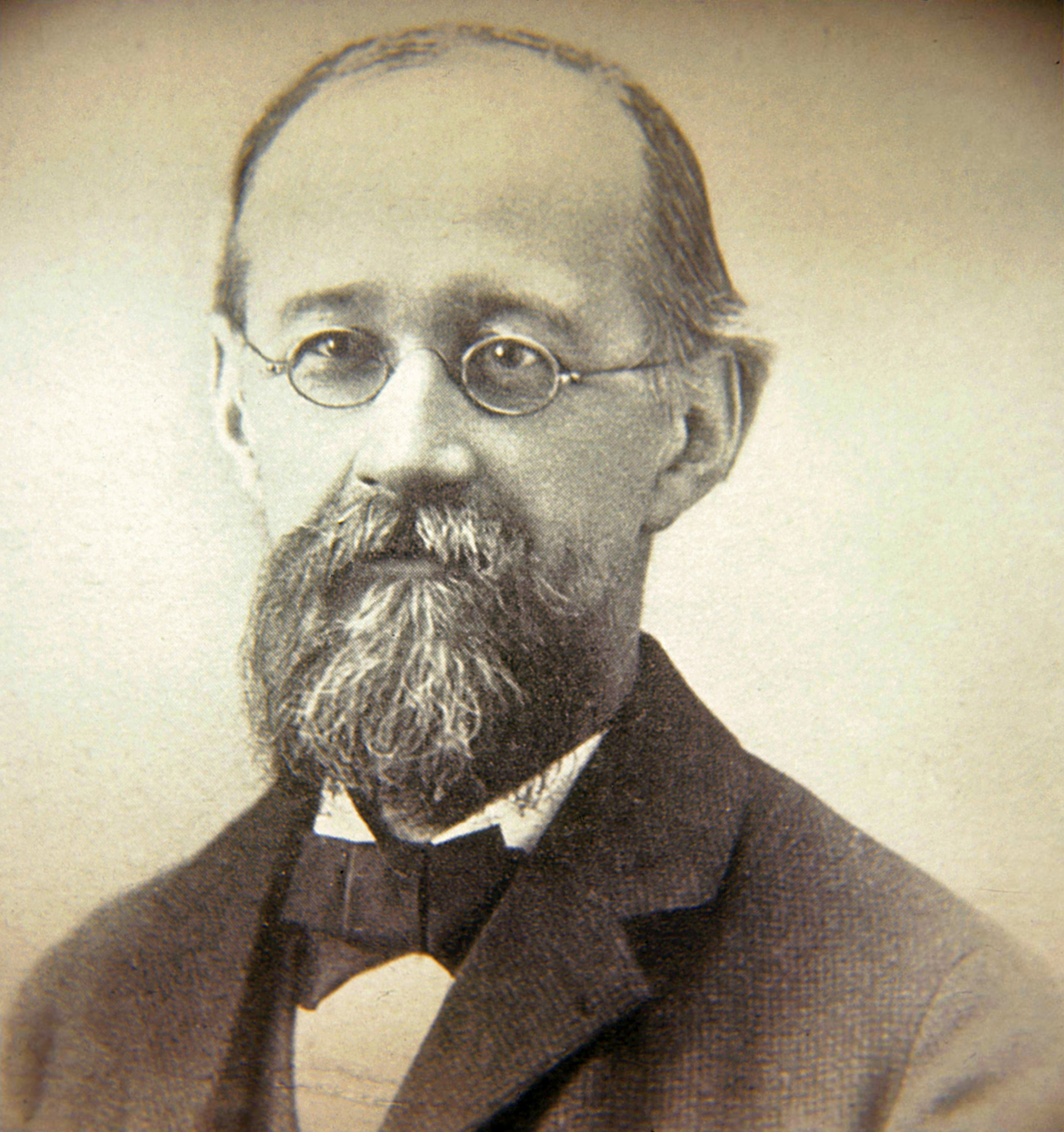

President of the American Library Association
- In office 1887–1889
- Preceded by: William Frederick Poole
- Succeeded by: Frederick Morgan Crunden

Personal details
- Born: March 14, 1837 Boston, Massachusetts, US
- Died: September 6, 1903 (aged 66) Walpole, New Hampshire, US
- Education: Harvard Divinity School
- Occupation: Librarian
- Known for: Developer of the Cutter Expansive Classification

Charles Ammi Cutter (March 14, 1837 – September 6, 1903) was an American librarian. In the 1850s and 1860s he assisted with the re-cataloging of the Harvard College library, producing America's first public card catalog. The card system proved more flexible for librarians and far more useful to patrons than the old method of entering titles in chronological order in large books. In 1868 he joined the Boston Athenaeum, making its card catalog an international model. Cutter promoted centralized cataloging of books, which became the standard practice at the Library of Congress. He was elected to leadership positions in numerous library organizations at the local and national level. Cutter is remembered for the Cutter Expansive Classification, his system of giving standardized classification numbers to each book, and arranging them on shelves by that number so that books on similar topics would be shelved together.

== Biography ==
Cutter was born in Boston, Massachusetts. His aunt was an employee of the regional library in Boston. In 1856 Cutter was enrolled into Harvard Divinity School. He was appointed assistant librarian of the divinity school while still a student there and served in that capacity from 1857 to 1859. During that time, Cutter began designing a distinct cataloging schema for the library's outdated system. The catalog, dating from 1840, had a lack of order after the acquisition of 4,000 volumes from the collection of Professor Gottfried Christian Friedrich Lücke of the University of Göttingen, which added much depth to the Divinity School Library's collection.

During the 1857–1858 school year, Cutter rearranged the library collection on the shelves into broad subject categories along with classmate Charles Noyes Forbes. During the winter break of 1858–1859, they arranged the collection into a single listing alphabetically by author. This project was finished by the time Cutter graduated in 1859. By 1860 Cutter was already a seasoned staff member of the library and a full-time librarian. He became a journeyman to the chief cataloger and assistant librarian to Ezra Abbot. At Harvard College Cutter developed a new form of index catalog, using cards instead of published volumes, containing both an author index and a "classed catalog" or a rudimentary form of subject index.

In 1868 the Boston Athenæum library elected Cutter as its head librarian. His first assignment was to organize and aggregate the inventory of the library and develop a catalog from that and to publish a complete dictionary catalog for their collection. The previous librarian and assistants had been working on this, but much of the work was sub par and, according to Cutter, needed to be redone. This did not sit well with the trustees who wanted to get a catalog published as soon as possible. However, the catalog was revised and published in five volumes and is known as the Athenæum Catalogue. Cutter was the librarian at the Boston Athenaeum for twenty-five years (1869-1892).

In 1876, Cutter was hired by the United States Bureau of Education to help write a report about the state of libraries for the Centennial. Part two of this report was his Rules for a Printed Dictionary Catalogue (1876). This catalog was included in the organization's publication Public Libraries in the United States of America: Their History, Condition, and Management. Cutter implemented many ideologies familiar to contemporary librarians during his time at the Athenaeum. Cutter introduced characteristic structures and philosophies such as inter-library loan and furnishing every book with a pouch in the rear to encase a card in order to keep track of the item's circulating status.

Cutter served as editor of the Library Journal from 1891 to 1893. Of the many articles he wrote during this time, one of the most famous was an article called "The Buffalo Public Library in 1983". In it, he wrote what he thought a library would be like one hundred years in the future. He spent a lot of time discussing practicalities, such as how the library arranged adequate lighting and controlled moisture in the air to preserve the books.

In 1891 Cutter introduced an avant-garde and divergent system of cataloging he termed the Cutter Expansive Classification. This system incorporated seven levels of classification with the most basic libraries operating at the first level and the grandest, most distinguished institutions utilizing the seventh level, and it was Cutter's aspiration to orchestrate a classification system for every type of library. The classification system, or scheme, utilized an alpha-numeric methodology used to abbreviate authors' names and generate unique call numbers known as "Cutter numbers" or "Cutter codes". This scheme, on which the current Library of Congress cataloging system is partially based, in turn laid the foundation for the Library of Congress Subject Headings and the Sears List of Subject Headings. When Cutter began to delegate a new system for the library he initially chose the Dewey Decimal Classification, however he determined it was more beneficial to assign a more distinct adaptation for the collection. Even though Cutter's Expansive Classification was recognized as a significant contribution to libraries and to the burgeoning field of library science, Cutter himself did not champion its success nor did he anticipate future editions of his system. Nevertheless, his "Cutter numbers" survived and are still used in libraries today.

Cutter also devised a table for author numbers, meant to assist libraries assign book numbers. His table was revised by Kate Sanborn, his assistant at Boston Athenaeum and cataloger at St. Louis Mercantile Library. The three-figure tables are still used in contemporary library classification.

Cutter did not find the Dewey system practical for his cataloging purposes, and indeed, Dewey and he often experienced tensions with one another while constituting the American Library Association, of which they were two of the 100 founding members in 1876. Nevertheless, he was regarded as an accomplished and sophisticated librarian and cataloger. Cutter was commissioned on at least one occasion to propose an architectural conception for the University of Toronto Library which had recently been consumed by a massive conflagration. In response to the library's requests, Cutter admonished, "It is of little use to have a fire proof stack if the rest of the building gets afire". The ever austere Cutter with his competence in cataloging expressed this, "The catalogers ought to be put near the catalog; they have continual reason to refer to it". Cutter then continued his cataloging tirade by rebuking their present approach and stating, "Catalog work cannot be carried on economically unless there is plenty of shelf room near for bibliographic authorities and some empty shelves in the room to hold books waiting to be cataloged".

In 1893, Cutter submitted a letter to the trustees that he would not seek to renew his contract at the end of the year. However, there was an opportunity for him in Northampton, Massachusetts. Judge Charles E. Forbes left a considerable amount of money to the town to start a library. This was Cutter's chance to institute his ideas from the ground up. He developed a cataloging system called the expansive classification system. It was to have seven levels of classification, each with increasing specificity. Thus small libraries who did not like having to deal with unnecessarily long classification numbers could use lower levels and still be specific enough for their purpose. Larger libraries could use the more specific tables since they needed to be more specific to keep subjects separate. He died in 1903 before he could finish this task. At Forbes, Cutter set up the art and music department and encouraged children of nearby schools to exhibit their art. He also established branch libraries and instituted a traveling library system much like the bookmobile. Today, Charles Ammi Cutter might be surprised to see his own portrait hanging over the reference librarians' desk in the Forbes Library in Northampton. His roll top desk is also in the office currently occupied by the recently elected director of the library.

Cutter died on September 6, 1903, in Walpole, New Hampshire.

== Predictions ==
- "The desks had... a little keyboard at each, connected by a wire. The reader had only to find the mark of his book in the catalog, touch a few lettered or numbered keys, and [the book] appeared after an astonishingly short interval."

Charles Cutter "The Buffalo Public Library in 1983" (Library journal 1883)

== See also ==
- Library catalog
- Subject (documents)

Non-profit organization positions
Preceded by William Frederick Poole	President of the American Library Association; 1887–1889	Succeeded by Frederick Morgan Crunden
