= John Crerar (industrialist) =

American industrialist (1827–1889)

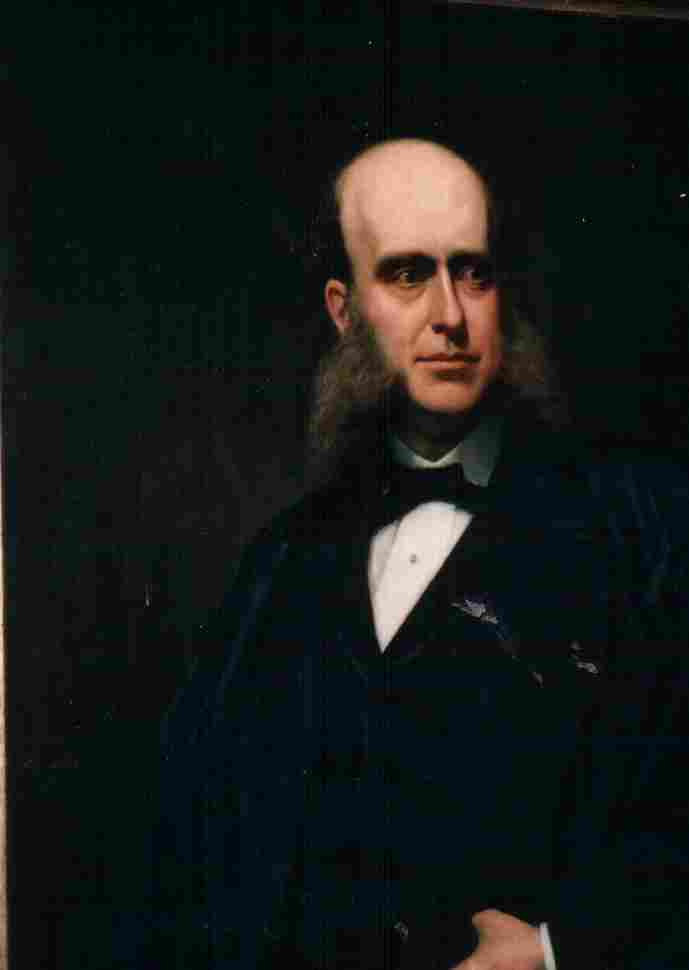
John Crerar

John Crerar (March 8, 1827 – October 19, 1889) was a wealthy American industrialist and businessman from Chicago whose investments were primarily in the railroad industry. Although he had a successful business career he is most well known for his philanthropic efforts, his activism in the Presbyterian Church, and his investment in the John Crerar Library.

== Early years ==
John Crerar was born in New York on March 8, 1827, to John Crerar (christened July 2, 1792 Dull, Perthshire, Scotland; died July 23, 1827 New York) and Agnes Smeallie (April 1, 1797 Kirkliston, Scotland; died March 28, 1873 New York). Agnes was the daughter of Andrew Smeall, born in 1748. She had independently come to New York in the 1820s, where she met John, who had left his native land for the fortunes of America. It is probable that they met each other through the Presbyterian Church to which they both belonged. John died on July 23, 1827, when John was an infant. After John's death, Agnes married John Boyd, the head of the New York branch of a British iron and steel company. John and his brother Peter Crerar (1821–1883) were thus able to receive a comfortable upbringing and good education in New York.

== Career ==
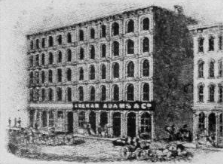
The original Crerar, Adams and Co. building

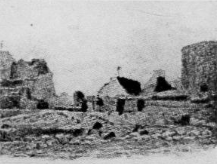
The building after the Great Chicago Fire

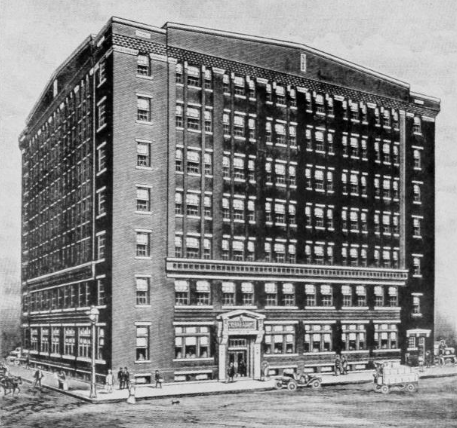
The Crerar, Adams and Co. building on October 25, 1910

He started at the New York branch office managed by his stepfather, advancing gradually until being sent to the Boston branch to serve as a bookkeeper. His stint in Boston would last for just over a year, at which time he returned to New York, determined to be independent of his stepfather. He joined a rival large iron firm, working there until the age of 29, always vigilant for a viable escape into an independent business life.

Crerar's luck changed when he met Morris K. Jesup, two years his junior, but already having established in 1853 a railroad supply company. Jesup was already a man renowned for his wealth and philanthropy, and he was Crerar's business partner for the rest of his life. In 1856, after several successful years, Jesup sought a new bookkeeper and turned to his new acquaintance John Crerar.

Along with Crerar as a member of Jesup's new railroad house was a John S. Kennedy. The firm followed the infant industry and greatly prospered. As the Michigan Southern Railroad and the Michigan Central Railroad came to Chicago in 1852, it soon became apparent that not New York but Chicago would become the capital of the railroad industry. From Jesup's firm, J. McGregor Adams was sent to Chicago, where the branch plant expanded. Adams was soon joined by Crerar as co-junior partners managing the lucrative Chicago branch. In 1863 Adams and Crerar succeeded to the title and established their own firm of Crerar, Adams and Co., retaining however, the old title until 1868. In that year they first advertised themselves as "Crerar, Adams & Co., manufacturers and dealers in railroad supplies and contractors' materials, 11 and 13 Wells Street." This location was destroyed by the 1871 fire, situating itself temporarily in a "mere shanty" and then at the Robbins Building, where it would continue until Crerar's death.

With Crerar's increasing prosperity other investments beckoned. He shied away from the real estate market, and from mere speculation. Although conservative in his investments, he was an early investor in the Pullman's revolutionary scheme of sleeping cabins on trains, contributing capital and organization knowledge to the huge Pullman Palace Car Company. When the company was founded in 1867, Crerar was an incorporator and a member of the board of directors, in which capacity he would serve for twenty-two years.

Crerar also served as director of the Chicago and Alton Railway, through which he gained his close friendship with T.B. Blackstone. In his will Crerar left Blackstone, although a man of great wealth, a bequest of $5,000, "to purchase some memento which will remind him of my appreciation and his uniform and life-long kindness to me." Other directorships included that of the London and Globe Insurance Company, the Illinois Trust and Savings Bank and the Chicago and Joliet Railroad.

== Politics ==
He was a Republican throughout his life. He only made one personal political attempt. In 1888 he accepted a nomination and was elected a presidential elector, for the Benjamin Harrison campaign.

== Clubs and associations ==
He became president of the Mercantile Library Association, and played an active civic role as a member of the Union Club, the Union League Club, and the Century Club, memberships he would retain after leaving New York.

== Religion ==
In New York, he dedicated his energy to the Scottish Presbyterian Church which had nurtured his family during their difficult early years in the city. His zeal for the community and particularly the church continued in Chicago, where he soon became an elder and then a trustee of the Second Presbyterian Church. Despite his growing business concerns, he attended church regularly, constantly reading the Bible, his favourite chapter of which was Romans 8, which he knew by heart.

Although generally a quiet man, religious skepticism was known to raise his ire, and he was often blunt in defending his beloved faith and church. An oft-told anecdote has Crerar "…exclaim in a tone of impatient disgust, at hearing some one ask if he really believed that Jonah was swallowed by a whale, 'Oh! bosh! What has that got to do with religion?'" As the Church moved and expanded, Crerar supported it through labour and capital, ultimately leaving it in his will $100,000, "…so long as said church preserves and maintains the principles of the Presbyterian faith." He also left $25,000 to the Second Presbyterian Church of New York, and $50,000 to the Presbyterian League of Chicago.

His support of religion crossed denominational lines, however, and was an active supporter of the Young Men's Christian Association, the American Sunday School Union. The Presbyterian Church commemorates its patron with the Crerar Memorial Church at 8100 South Calumet Avenue.

== Philanthropy ==
His philanthropy was not only confined to religious causes, but he sought to help a wide swath of society. Goodspeed recounts that Crerar kept in the upper-right drawer of his office desk a cheque-book, from which he would dispense charitable gifts. Upon writing a cheque, he would write on the remaining stub the reason for its issuance. The completed stubs indicate the general spirit of his philanthropy, recording contributions to "A woman going about doing good," and the like. As a contemporary said of him, "His philanthropy knew no bounds or limits, but was constantly active and progressive, without ostentation." He thus contributed money to such myriad charities as the Chicago Relief and Aid Society, the Presbyterian Hospital, the Chicago Literary Club, the Chicago Historical Society, the Nursery and Hald Orphan Asylum; St. Luke's Free Hospital; the Chicago Bible Society; Saint Andrew's Society of the State of New York, Illinois Training School for Nurses; Old Peoples' Home of Chicago; Chicago Home of the Friendless. He was central in the 1882 founding of the Chicago Manual Training School, later part of the high school of the University of Chicago. A bequest of $50,000 to this institution founded a John Crerar Prize, to be given to the best student of every graduating class. The Crerar School at 8445 South Kolin Street, Chicago is named after him.

Although a captain of industry, Crerar never let business smother his love of books and his cultural concerns. In his daily regimen of reading several newspapers, he read for himself and others, gleefully snipping and saving any stories that might amuse his friends. As president of the Mercantile Library Association of New York, he was instrumental in bringing William Makepeace Thackeray, author of Vanity Fair, to America on a lecture tour. In his will he left $10,000 to the Chicago Literary Club.

=== John Crerar Library ===
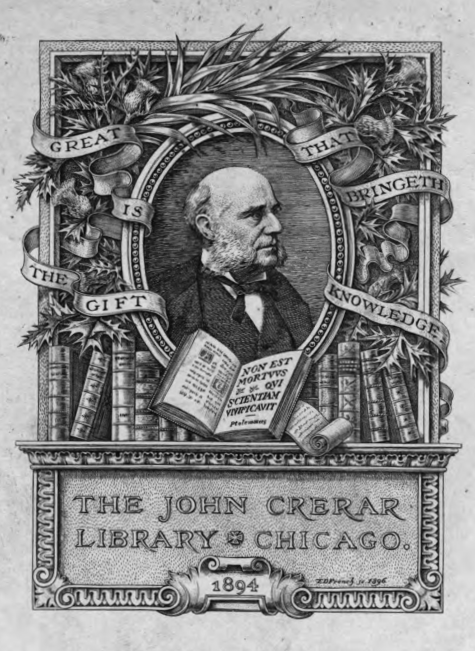
Frontispiece from a book in the library

This literary bequest was, of course, shadowed, by his posthumous gift of a library to the city of Chicago, in the form of a two million dollar bequest:

I give, devise, and bequeath and all the rest, remainder and residue of my estate both real and personal for the erection, creation, maintenance and endowment of a Free Public Library to be called The John Crerar Library and to be located in the city of Chicago, Illinois, a preference being given to the South Division of the city inasmuch as the Newberry Library will be located in the North Division…I desire the building to be tasteful, substantial and fireproof and that a sufficient fund to be reserved over and above the cost of its construction to provide, maintain, and support a library for all time. I desire that the books and periodicals be selected with a view to create and sustain a healthy moral and Christian sentiment in the community and that all nastiness and immorality be excluded. I do not mean by this that there shall be nothing but hymn books and sermons, but I mean that dirty French novels and all skeptical trash and works of questionable moral tone shall never be found in this library. I want its atmosphere that of Christian refinement, and its aim and object the building up of character, and I rest content that the friends I have named will carry out my wishes in those particulars.

It was not he but his executors who chose to make the John Crerar Library primarily a library of scientific, medical and technical reference, as a means of avoiding the literary lure of prurient Parisian prose. As specified in the will, Norman Williams, Crerar's friend and executor, became the first president. The library is now affiliated with the University of Chicago and contains over one million volumes.

=== Abraham Lincoln statue ===
The last bequest of prominence was $100,000 for a giant statue of Abraham Lincoln. His trustees commissioned the sculptor Augustus Saint Gaudens to create this tribute, in his last great work. It was placed in Grant Park. Later it was loaned by the Chicago Parks Commissioners to the Panama-Pacific International Exposition, and viewed by millions of visitors in San Francisco in 1915. Speaking of this contribution to the Chicago cultural landscape, Judge B.D. Magruder, speaking before the Chicago Literary Club, said, "With a modesty that bespeaks the greatness of his soul, he orders a simple headstone to be placed at his own grave, but that a colossal statue be raised to the man who abolished slavery in the United States. The millionaire is content to lie low, but he insists that the great emancipator shall rise high…This contrast between the headstone and the statue indicates, as plainly as though it had been expressed in words, Mr. Crerar's estimate of true heroism. Doing good to others was his conception of greatness."

== Death ==
Crerar lived a relatively short life. Soon after reaching his 62nd year, his health began to decline. His doctor, Dr. Frank Billings, accompanied him to Atlantic City, New Jersey, the climate of which was thought to have been good for his health, but on 9 September, he suffered a partial stroke of paralysis on his right side. After a limited recovery, he returned to the home of his closest friend, Norman Williams, where he died on October 19, 1889. On December 22, 1889, a great memorial service was held in the Central Music Hall, from which throngs of mourners had to be turned away. Orators included the Hon. Thomas B. Bryan, Franklin MacVeagh, the Rev. Frank M. Bristol, and Bishop Fallows. Franklin MacVeagh stated that "He has set us an example of the right use of wealth, the great uses of wealth, the permanent uses of wealth, and the final uses of wealth." J. McGregor Adams, his business partner and friend, stated:

He was a high-souled generous man, liberal in all things, and one whose friendship was a thing to be prized and be proud of. He was a philanthropist of the noblest type and did a wonderful amount of good in a quiet way. For twenty-five years he and I have been business partners and during that long period we never had a quarrel or dispute in any way. To his employees he was always the same, pleasant, genial, approachable. Frank and outspoken and decided in his views he never hesitated to express them, though it was always done in an affable manner. He had a vein of quiet humour that made him a very companionable man. Full of fun and anecdotes, he dearly loved a good story.

He expressed a desire in his will to be buried beside his mother, the central figure in his life, from which he had inherited his religious and social zeal, and who had predeceased him in 1873. Crerar's wish for his own memorial: "I ask that I be buried by the side of my honoured mother in Green-Wood Cemetery, Brooklyn, New York, in the family lot…I desire that a plain headstone, similar to that which marks my mother's grave, to be raised over my head." It is there that he rests. On the plain headstone is inscribed a fine Presbyterian epitaph: "A just man and one that feared God." John had his wish, to be buried in the family plot at Greenwood Cemetery, lot 3166, s.80.

== Litigation over will ==
After John's death, litigation arose over his will as distant relatives, mostly resident in North Easthope, near Stratford, Ontario, Canada, read of their exclusion from the bequests. The disputants claimed to be first cousins on his father's side, not blaming their omission on spite but on ignorance due to the early death of Crerar's father:

…in his will, Mr. Crerar made no mention of his next of kin on his father's side and seemed to be ignorant of the fact that there were such next of kin; that he gave divers large bequests and legacies to his cousins on his mother's side; that he left no kin of nearer degree than first cousins and that complainants are his first cousins on his father's side and constitute all of his first cousins and next of kin, except the first cousins on his mother's side…

The disputants listed in Crerar v. Williams [145 Ill. 625; 34 N.E. 467; 44 Ill. 625] were: Donald Crerar, Peter Crerar, Mary Crerar, Catherine Cramb, Elizabeth McGregor, Duncan Stewart, Alexander Stewart, Peter Stewart, Margaret Crerar, Elizabeth Menzies, Catherine Forsythe, and Elizabeth McIntosh. They filed their suit on May 28, 1891, claiming in the writ to be "heirs at law of and next of kin to John Crerar, dec'd".

The legal battle was fierce and protracted. The will was defended by the law firms of Williams, Holt and Wheeler, and Lyman and Jackson. After a defeat in the Circuit Court, the disputants appealed to the Illinois Supreme Court in Ottawa, Illinois. There, on June 19, 1893, the will was sustained in all its provisions. Central to the evidence was the fortitude with which John Crerar had drafted his monumental will. As Goodspeed writes, "It was not made in any immediate expectation of death. It was not the hurried work of the sick bed, but the well-considered, fully matured work of a man little past middle age, in the full vigour of health, with the possibility of many years of active life still before him… it was evidently the result of long reflection and final, deliberate, purpose." To the benefit of Chicago, the will was upheld.

== Middle name ==
Many websites list John's middle name as "Chippewa", but this unusual name does not appear in any sources from his lifetime.

== References and notes ==
- The Biographical Dictionary and Portrait Gallery of Representative Men of Chicago, 1892
- The American Cyclopaedia
- John Crerar and the Founding of the Library
- About the John Crerar Library
- History of John Crerar
- The John Crerar Library. A Free Public Reference Library of Scientific Literature. 1894-1905 by Clement Walker Andrews, Librarian - (Reprint from Libraries of Chicago) Chicago, 1905.
- The John Crear Library
