= Clement Walker Andrews =

American librarian

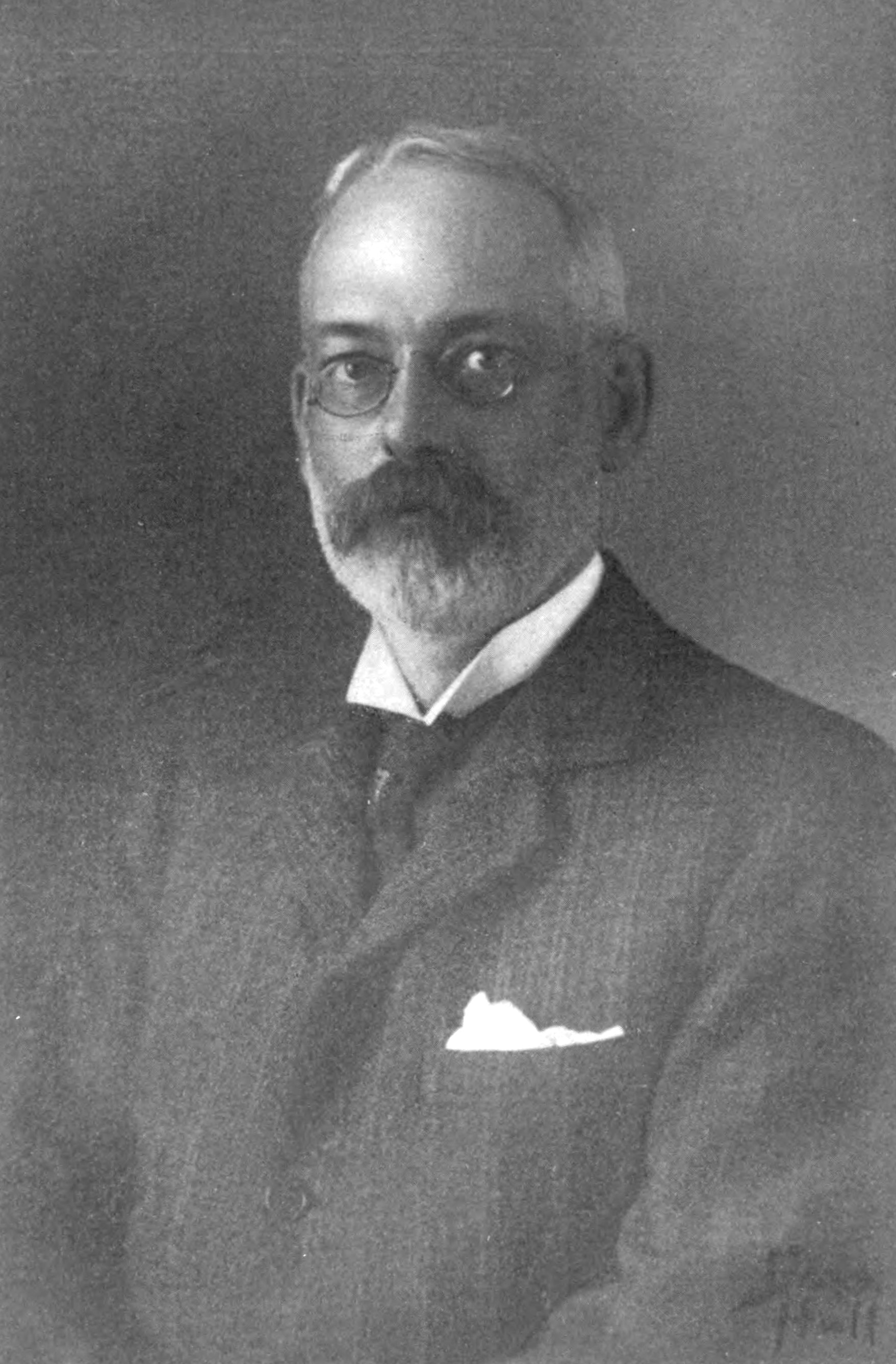
- Andrews in 1907

25th President of the American Library Association
- In office 1906–1907
- Preceded by: Frank Pierce Hill
- Succeeded by: Arthur Elmore Bostwick

1st Librarian and Executive Director of the John Crerar Library
- In office 1895–1928
- Succeeded by: Jens Christian Bay

Personal details
- Born: January 13, 1858 Salem, Massachusetts, U.S.
- Died: November 20, 1930 (aged 72) Chicago, Illinois, U.S.
- Education: Harvard University
- Occupation: Librarian

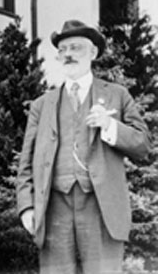
Andrews in 1916

Clement Walker Andrews (January 13, 1858 – November 20, 1930) was an American librarian. Andrews graduated from Harvard University in 1880 and served as an instructor in chemistry at the Massachusetts Institute of Technology from 1883 to 1892. He served as librarian at the Institute from 1889 to 1895. Andrews served as the first librarian of John Crerar Library from 1895 until his retirement in 1928. His contributions to the profession of Library Science include the introduction of catalog card exchanges between libraries and printed lists of current periodicals.

Andrews served as president of the American Library Association from 1906 to 1907 and as President of the American Library Institute from 1922 to 1924.

== See also ==
- John Crerar Library
- Massachusetts Institute of Technology Libraries

Non-profit organization positions
Preceded by Frank Pierce Hill	President of the American Library Association; 1906–1907	Succeeded by Arthur Elmore Bostwick
