= Winser =

Winser is a surname. Notable people with the surname include:

- Beatrice Winser (1869–1947) American librarian
- Kim Winser (born 1959), Scottish businesswoman
- Margaret Winser (1869–1944), English sculptor
- Peter Winser (c. 1781–1865), Canadian merchant and politician
