= Nathaniel Dana Carlile Hodges =

American librarian

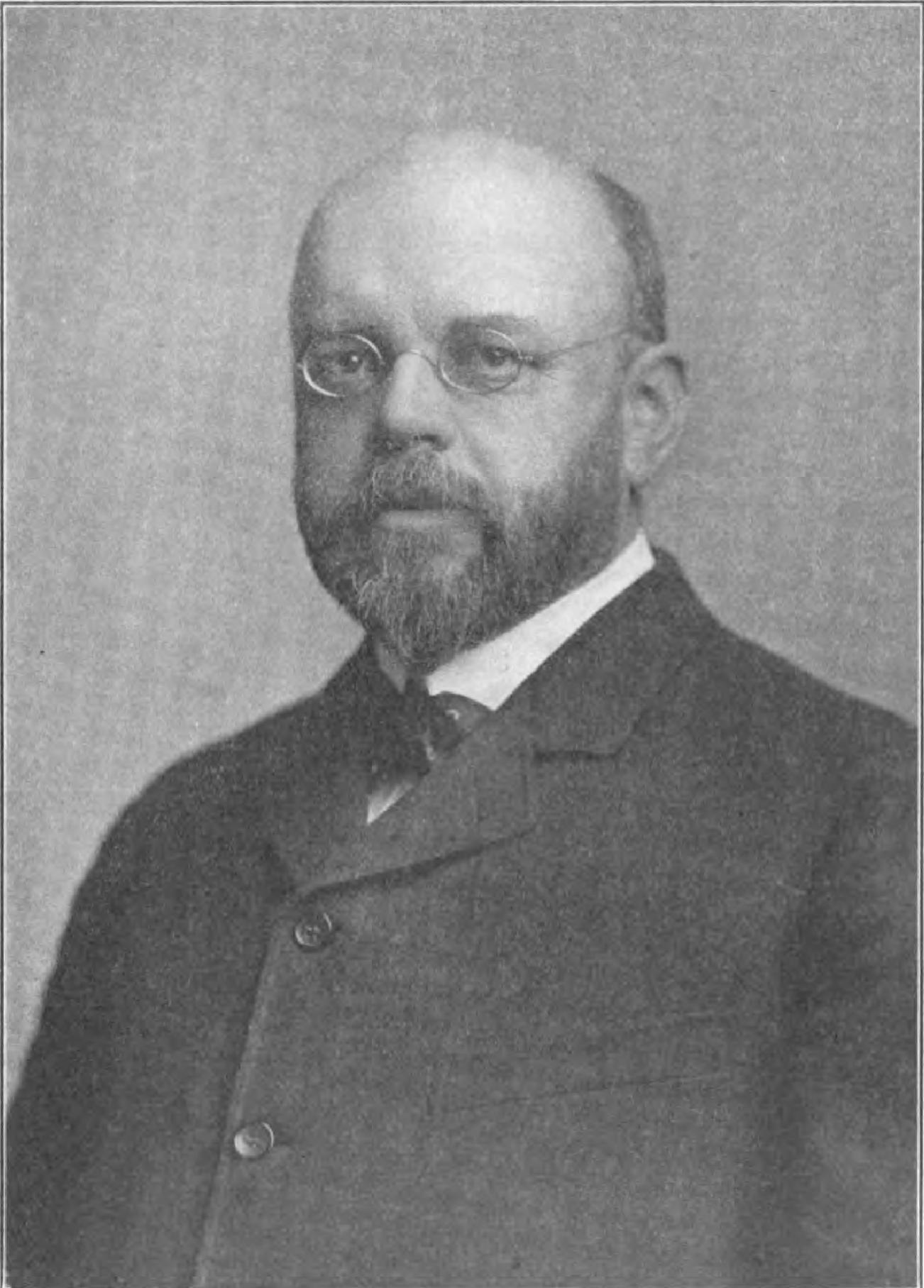
- Hodges in 1910

President of the American Library Association
- In office 1909–1910
- Preceded by: Charles Henry Gould
- Succeeded by: James Ingersoll Wyer

Personal details
- Born: April 19, 1852 Salem, Massachusetts, USA
- Died: November 25, 1927 (aged 75) Mount Healthy, Ohio, US
- Education: Harvard University
- Occupation: Librarian

Nathaniel Dana Carlile Hodges (April 19, 1852 – November 25, 1927) was an American librarian. Hodges attended Harvard University, receiving his bachelor's degree in 1874 and his master's degree in 1879. He was appointed to be an assistant in Physics at Harvard University in 1879. Hodges went on to teach at Worcester Polytechnic Institute from 1882 to 1883 and served as editor of Science Magazine from 1885 to 1894.

He became the Library Director of the Cincinnati Public Library in 1900 and retired from that position in 1924. Hodges served as the president of the American Library Association from 1909 to 1910. Hodges was named a Notable Ohio Librarians in the Hall of Fame in 1980.

== See also ==
- Cincinnati Public Library

Non-profit organization positions
| Preceded by Charles Henry Gould | President of the American Library Association; 1909–1910 | Succeeded by James Ingersoll Wyer |
