= Arthur Elmore Bostwick =

Librarian and author

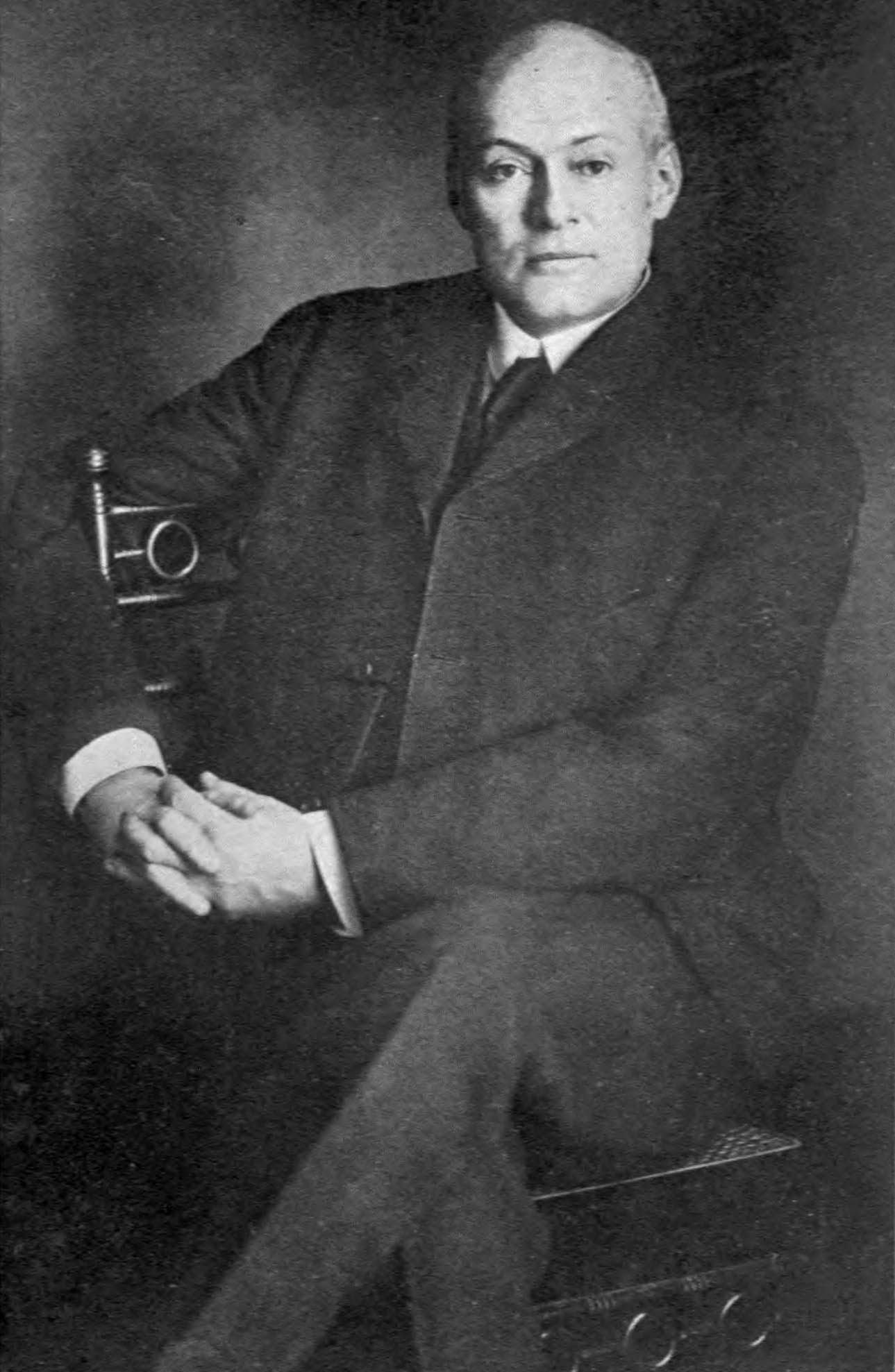

President of the American Library Association
- In office 1907–1908
- Preceded by: Clement Walker Andrews
- Succeeded by: Charles Henry Gould

Personal details
- Born: March 8, 1860 Litchfield, Connecticut, US
- Died: February 13, 1942 (aged 81) St. Louis, Missouri, US
- Spouse: Lucy Sawyer (m. 1885)
- Children: 3
- Education: Yale University
- Occupation: Librarian; writer

Arthur Elmore Bostwick (March 8, 1860 – February 13, 1942) was a United States librarian and author.

== Early life ==
Arthur Elmore Bostwick was born on March 8, 1860, in Litchfield, Connecticut, to David Elmore Bostwick (1821–1872) and Adelaide McKinley (1830–1900). His paternal grandparents were Joel Bostwick and Nancy Stone. His father died when he was 12, and his mother supplemented the family income by various means to afford his education at Litchfield Institute, and later at Yale University, where he received his BA in 1881, and his PhD degree in 1883.

== Career ==
After graduating from Yale, He taught high school in Montclair, New Jersey, for two years, before engaging in literary work on Appletons' Cyclopædia of American Biography, Appletons' Annual Cyclopædia and Funk & Wagnall's Standard Dictionary. With his cousin John D. Champlin, he edited a popular Young Folks' Cyclopedia of Games and Sports (1890).

He started his library career in 1895 as chief librarian at New York Free Circulating Library, where his former boss William W. Appleton (1845–1924) had founded and chaired the library committee. He viewed libraries as venues for popular education, in contrast with many librarians at that time, like John Shaw Billings, who viewed them as mainly for reference use. In 1899, he moved to the Brooklyn Public Library. He accomplished much, though civil service struggles persuaded him to move back to former position in 1901, and in a merger with New York Public Library he became chief of circulation, with Billings as director. Here too he accomplished a great deal, but struggles with Billings persuaded him to move on and accept the opportunity to head the Saint Louis Public Library in 1909.

At St. Louis, he remained head librarian until 1938, and associate librarian until his death. He found the system with four branches, and expanded it to 19. In American National Biography, John Mark Tucker criticizes his service during World War I because he removed pro-German material from the library shelves. Joseph Alfred Boromé, in Dictionary of American Biography, praises his liberality during this time because he refused to halt circulation of German books.

Bostwick was president of the American Library Association 1907–08 and the American Library Institute 1909–11. In 1925, he visited China at the request of a library association there to inspect facilities and make recommendations. In 1932-33 he was president of the Association of American Library Schools.

== Personal life ==
In 1885, he married Lucy Sawyer. They had three children.

Arthur Elmore Bostwick died at Missouri Baptist Hospital on February 13, 1942.

== Works ==
- The American Public Library, undertaken at Appleton's suggestion (1910)
- The Different West, as seen by a Transplanted Easterner (1913)
- Earmarks of Literature (1914)
- The Making of an American Library (1915)
- Library Essays: Papers Related to the Work of Public Libraries (1920)
- A Librarian's Open Shelf: Essays on Various Subjects (1920)

== Bibliography ==
- Joseph A. Boromé (1973). "Bostwick, Arthur Elmore". Dictionary of American Biography. Vol. Supplement 3 (1941–1945). New York: Charles Scribner's Sons.
- John Mark Tucker (1999). "Bostwick, Arthur Elmore". American National Biography (online ed.). New York: Oxford University Press. doi:10.1093/anb/9780198606697.article.0900101. (subscription required)

Non-profit organization positions
Preceded by Clement Walker Andrews	President of the American Library Association; 1907–1908	Succeeded by Charles Henry Gould
