= Young E. Allison =

American writer (1853–1932)

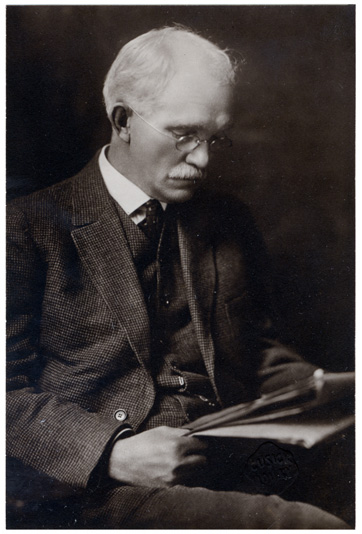
Young Ewing Allison

Young Ewing Allison (December 23, 1853 – July 7, 1932) was an American writer and newspaper editor.

Born in Henderson, Kentucky, Allison was partially deaf from an early age and became a voracious reader. By the age of fifteen he was working as an editor for the Henderson News; in 1873, he moved to Evansville, Indiana, where he continued as a newspaper editor. The quality of his reporting caught the attention of the managing editor of the Louisville Courier-Journal, and in 1880, Allison was taken on as city editor. In 1887 he founded a trade journal, The Insurance Field, and was its editor until 1926.

Allison was a writer of prose and verse and is best remembered for his poem the "Derelict", written to complete the famous verse fragment by Robert Louis Stevenson in Treasure Island, "Fifteen Men on the Dead Man's Chest". He also wrote the libretto to Henry Waller's The Ogallallas, the first American-Indian opera, in 1890. He maintained a long correspondence with Eugene Field and James Whitcomb Riley, the latter of whom dedicated several volumes of poetry to Allison.

The last years of his life were spent exploring Kentucky's rich history, often with his close friend J. Christian Bay of Chicago. He wrote several articles on the Abbey of Gethsemani, a Trappist monastery in western Kentucky. Allison also played a prominent role in the establishment of Federal Hill, the mansion in Bardstown, Kentucky, that is said to have inspired Stephen Foster's song "My Old Kentucky Home", as a state historic site in 1922.

== Works ==
- On the Vice of Novel-Reading, 1897
- Delicious Vice, 1907–09
- City of Louisville and a Glimpse of Kentucky, 1887
- Curious Legend of Louis Philippe in Kentucky, 1924
- Select Works of Young E. Allison, 1935
