= John Crerar Library =

Private research library in Chicago, Illinois, USA

Coordinates: 41.7907°N 87.6028°W

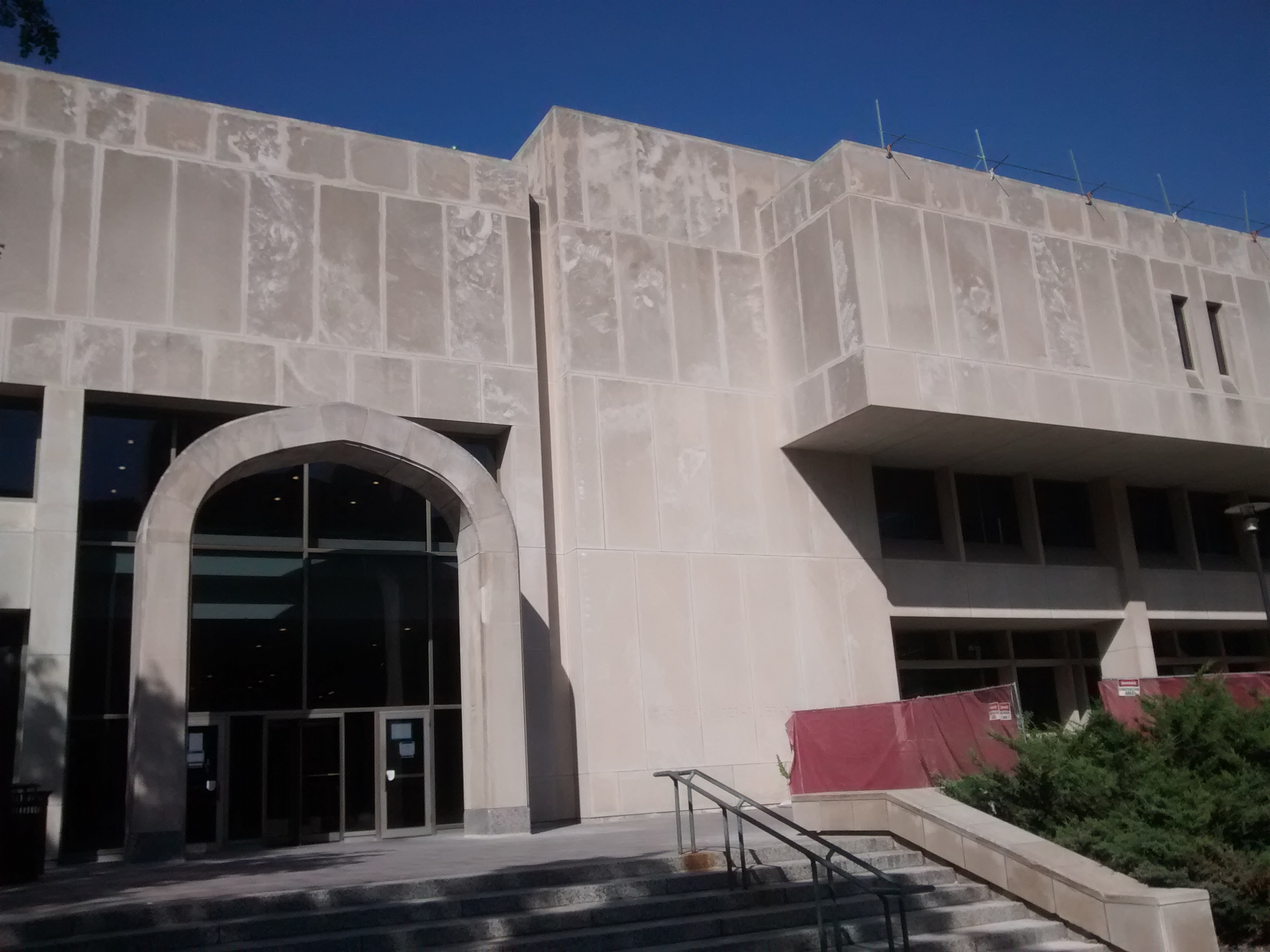
- Location: Hyde Park, Chicago, Illinois, United States
- Type: Private academic library
- Scope: Biological, medical, and physical sciences
- Established: 1894
- Branch of: University of Chicago Library

Collection
- Size: 1.4 million

Access and use
- Access requirements: Open to the public

Other information
- Parent organization: University of Chicago
- Website: lib.uchicago.edu/crerar

The John Crerar Library (/krəˈrɑːr/ KRAY-rar; JCL) is the academic library for science, technology, and medicine at the University of Chicago. It is part of the University of Chicago Library.

The original John Crerar Library was founded in downtown Chicago in 1894 and opened to the public on April 1, 1897. It was named after John Crerar, who donated the funds and made his fortune in the railroad supply business. In 1981, facing continuing financial pressures, the Board of Directors of the John Crerar Library gave all of its collection to the University of Chicago to merge with the university's science collection, resulting in a new building that opened in 1984 on the University of Chicago campus and was named "The John Crerar Library" under the bilateral agreement. Since then, the library has become part of the University of Chicago Library system. The library building's renovation was completed in fall 2018 to also accommodate the Department of Computer Science and the Center for Data and Applied Computing.

Throughout its history, the library's technology resources have made it popular with Chicago-area business and industry. Though privately owned and operated, the library continues to provide free access to the public for the purpose of conducting research in science, medicine and technology.

== History ==
=== Independent library ===
John Crerar died in 1889. His will donated approximately $2.6 million of his estate to Chicago as an endowment for a free public library, selected "to create and sustain a healthy moral and Christian sentiment, and that all nastiness and immorality be excluded." To comply with Crerar's wishes without duplicating existing area libraries, the directors decided to limit the collections to the sciences, including the history of science. In 1906, the directors expanded the library's mission to include medicine. Since 1951, the collection has focused on current science, technology, and medicine.

In 1891, Crerar's friends lobbied the Illinois state legislature to enact a law to protect privately funded libraries, entitled, "An Act to Encourage and Promote the Establishment of Free Public Libraries in Cities, Villages and Towns of this State." On October 12, 1894, the library was incorporated under that law. However, Crerar's relatives contested his will and then appealed issue to the Illinois Supreme Court. On June 19, 1893, the will was sustained.

The Crerar Library opened in the Marshall Field building, moving in 1921 to its own building at the northwest corner of Randolph Street and Michigan Avenue. The Board of Directors of the library established a building fund with the 1889 endowment and set out to gain approval for a Grant Park location. In 1902, the Chicago City Council approved the plan, but public criticism forced the design to be built on the Northwest corner of Michigan Avenue. World War I postponed groundbreaking of the 16-story Holabird & Roche design until 1919.

When the building reached its capacity in the 1950s, the library's directors decided to affiliate with a university. The directors contracted with the Illinois Institute of Technology to provide library services for its campus. In 1962, the library moved into a new building that was designed by architect Walter Netsch. It was a 92,000-square-foot (8,500 m^{2}) facility with an international modern design inspired by Mies van der Rohe. During its 22 years located on the Illinois Institute of Technology campus, the John Crerar Library remained a separate organization, with IIT reimbursing the costs attributable to it. By the mid-1970s, however, the library had out-grown that building, and in 1980 Crerar and the Illinois Institute of Technology agreed to terminate the contract within four years.

Librarians and Executive Directors
Clement Walker Andrews	1895–1928
J. Christian Bay	1928–1946
Herman H. Henkle	1947–1969
William S. Budington	1969–1984

Following World War II, the John Crerar Library became one of the first to offer a fee-based research service which was targeted to industry and government users. In 1952, it became one of the first libraries in the nation to install a Teletype machine. The library now offers computer-based searches of a wide variety of scientific and medical data bases. Since the 1950s, the library offers corporate memberships to both for-profit and non-profit organizations that now includes borrowing privileges and access to the University of Chicago Libraries as well as to Crerar. Also, from 1968 to 1979, the United States National Library of Medicine funded the library to serve as its Midwest Regional Medical Library.

=== Part of the University of Chicago ===
On April 13, 1981, due to the continuing financial pressures of the library, the John Crerar Library Board of Directors signed an agreement with the Board of Trustees of the University of Chicago to consolidate the John Crerar Library collection with the University of Chicago's science collection in a new building, which was opened on September 10, 1984, on the University of Chicago campus. Under the agreement, the new library and its building constructed on the University of Chicago campus shall be named "The John Crerar Library". Because the John Crerar Library legal entity was incorporated under the 1891 special law, court approval was required for the merger. A condition of the merger was that the combined library would also remain free to the public. The merger, with a combined collection of 900,000 volumes, was among the largest in American library history.

In 1984, after the new library building was completed, the John Crerar Library was fully incorporated into the University of Chicago and became part of the University of Chicago Library system. The current four-story structure opened in 1984 was designed by Stubbins Associates of Cambridge, Massachusetts, and has 160,836 gross square feet of floor space, with dimensions 135 feet (41 m) east-west by 294 feet (90 m) north-south, costing $22 million to build. The building has capacity for 1.3 million volumes with 770,000 volumes on 27 miles (43 km) of conventional shelving and 530,000 volumes on 12 miles (19 km) of movable compact shelving.

The merger set aside $300,000 to form a separate John Crerar Foundation. The Foundation now also sponsors the John Crerar Foundation Science Writing Prize for College students. The official motto of the John Crerar Library is engraved on its current building: Non est mortuus qui scientiam vivificavit (translation: "He has not died who has given life to knowledge")

The Crerar collection includes 27,000 rare books including works by Copernicus, Leonardo da Vinci, Descartes, Franklin, and Newton.

The John Crerar Library building's renovation was completed in fall 2018 to also accommodate the Department of Computer Science and the Center for Data and Applied Computing.
