= Newark Public Library =

The Newark Public Library

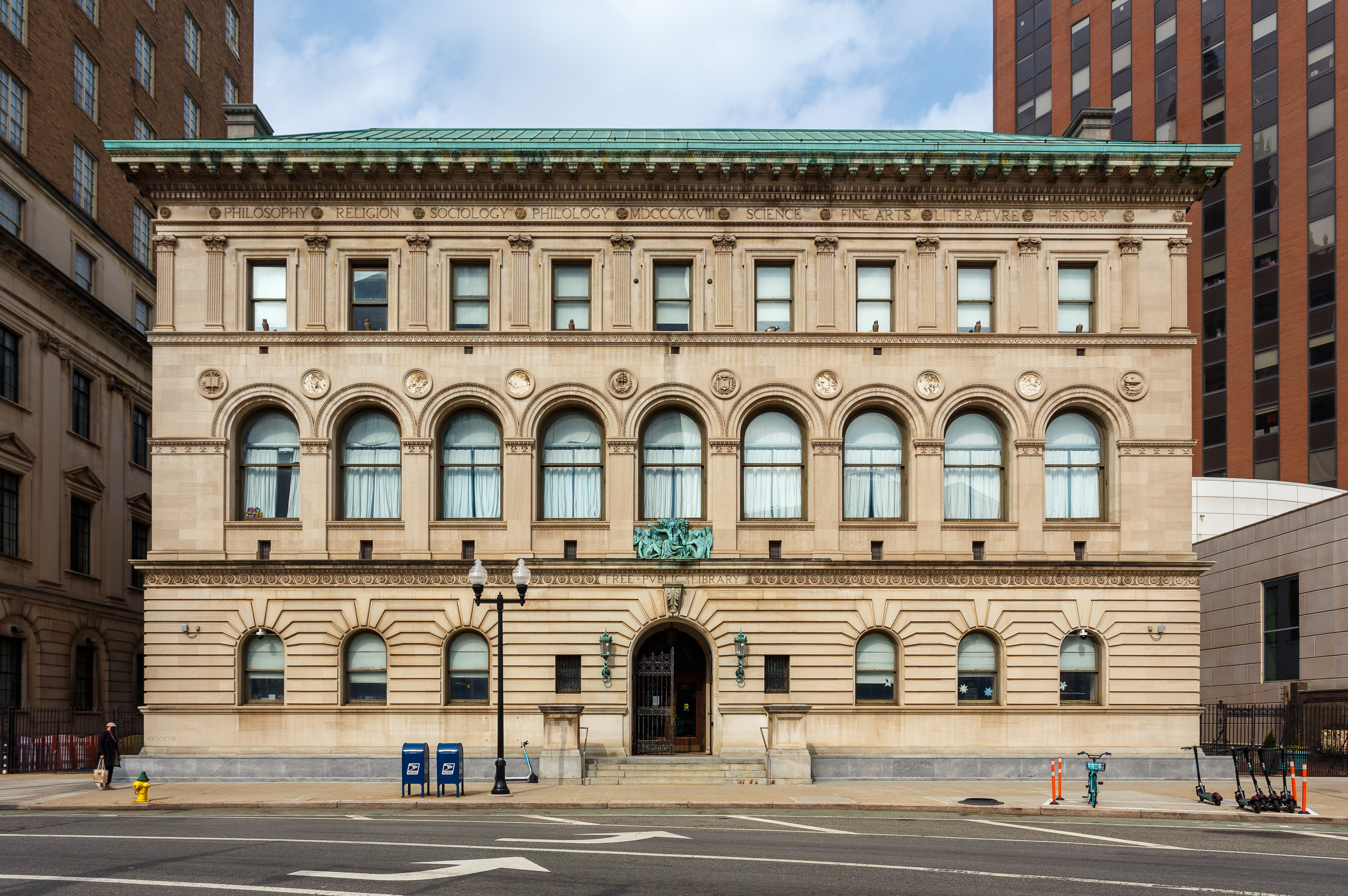
- Location: Newark, New Jersey, US
- Established: 1847
- Branches: 6 (Weequahic, Van Buren, Vailsburg, North End, Branchbrook, Springfield), 4 closed branches

Collection
- Size: 1,691,042

Access and use
- Circulation: 164,022
- Population served: 281,402
- Members: 72,605

Other information
- Budget: $11,351,129
- Employees: 98
- Website: www.npl.org

- James Street Commons Historic District
- U.S. National Register of Historic Places
- U.S. Historic district – Contributing property
- New Jersey Register of Historic Places
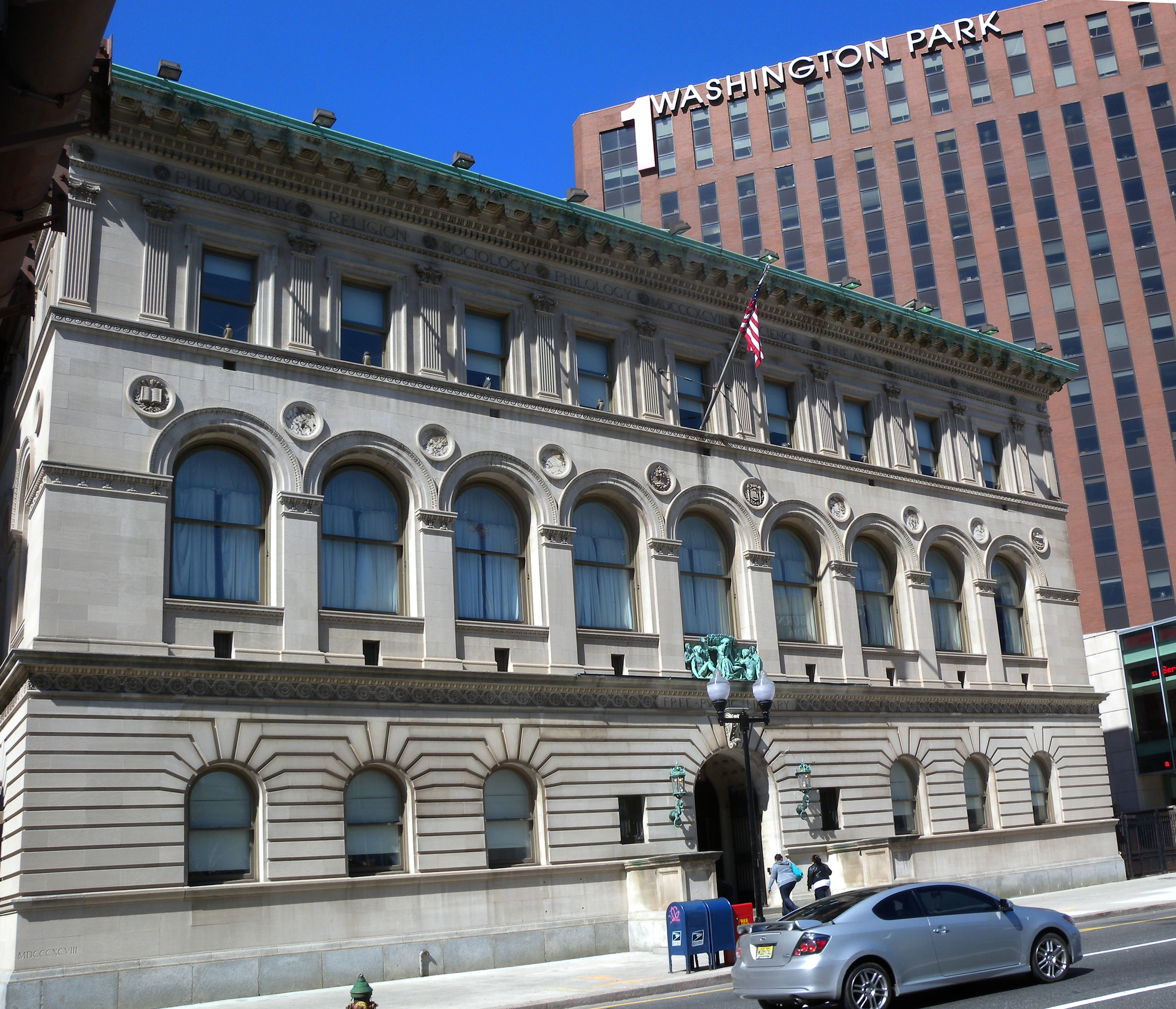

- Location within Essex County, New Jersey Location within New Jersey Location within the United States
- Coordinates: 40.74459°N 74.17067°W
- NRHP reference No.: 78001758
- NJRHP No.: 1275

Significant dates
- Added to NRHP: January 9, 1978
- Designated NJRHP: February 10, 1977

The Newark Public Library (NPL) is a public library system in Newark, New Jersey, United States. The library system offers numerous programs and events to its diverse population. With seven different branches, the Newark Public Library serves as a Statewide Reference Center. The Newark Public Library is the public library system for the city of Newark, Essex County, New Jersey. The library system has a collection of art and literature, art and history exhibits, a variety of programs for all ages. It is home to author Philip Roth's collections.

== Locations ==
Name	Address	Website	Opening Date
Branch Brook Branch	235 Clifton Avenue	npl.org/community-libraries/branch-brook-branch/	1946
Main Library	5 Washington Street	npl.org/main-library/	1901
North End Branch	722 Summer Avenue	npl.org/community-libraries/north-end-branch/	1930
Springfield Branch	50 Hayes Street	npl.org/community-libraries/springfield-branch/	1923
Vailsburg Branch	75 Alexander Street	npl.org/community-libraries/vailsburg-branch/	1927
Van Buren Branch	140 Van Buren Street	npl.org/community-libraries/van-buren-branch/	1923
Weequahic Branch	355 Osborne Terrace	npl.org/community-libraries/weequahic-branch/	1929

Closed branches

Name	Address	Closed	Reason
First Avenue	282 First Ave	2010	Budget cuts, Great Recession
Madison	790 Clinton Ave	2010	Budget cuts, Great Recession
Roseville	99 Fifth St	2009	Budget cuts, Great Recession
Clinton Branch	739 Bergen St	2021	Hazardous Building Conditions

== History ==
The historic Newark Public Library traces its beginnings to the Newark Library Association, a private organization that was chartered in 1847. In 1887, the people of Newark approved the founding of a Free Public Library. The first director of the library was Frank Pierce Hill.

The Newark Free Public Library opened on West Park Street in the central ward of downtown Newark in 1889 and offered a collection of over 10,000 books which had been acquired from the Newark Library Association.

Over time, the influx of more books and an increasing population necessitated the construction of a new building at 5 Washington Street, the current location of the main branch of the Newark Public Library which opened in 1901. An architectural marvel, the new building, designed by Rankin and Kellogg, was influenced by the 15th century Palazzo Strozzi in Florence, Italy. The library also served as a museum, lecture hall, and a gallery.

In 1902, John Cotton Dana succeeded Frank Pierce Hill to become the director of the library. Dana greatly promoted the educational value of the library. For example, he established foreign language collections for immigrants and even developed a special collection for the business community. This "Business Branch" was the first of its kind in the nation. Dana was employed at the library until his death in 1929. He also founded the Newark Museum in 1909, inside the library, directing it until his death.

After the death of Dana in 1929, Beatrice Winser took over as director of the library and museum until 1942. In 1930, the library had a book truck which took books to children throughout Newark. In 1929, the library's New Jersey Collection was founded, which later became The Charles F. Cummings New Jersey Information Center. The CFCNJIC became a separate Library department in 1951. In 1963 the library became a Federal Regional Depository.

The Newark Public Library claims to have negotiated its first international interlibrary loan in 1955 with the German government. According to researchers on the subject of international interlibrary loans, this was not exactly on the cutting edge of international interlibrary loan history, as international interlibrary loans have been occurring in different forms throughout the ages. However, "The United States ... was slow to resume international lending [after World War II]. Although some individual U.S. libraries reluctantly began to loan materials to Europe after the war, it was not until 1959 ... that the majority of U.S. libraries willingly resumed lending their materials across the Atlantic". Newark Public Library was a part of the vanguard to reactivate international interlibrary loans after the events of World War II, reconnecting the library systems of North America to the rest of the world.

According to the Newark Public Library, the library itself was threatened with closure twice officially within a decade, one of these responsible for the potential closure being the mayor of the city, Hugh Joseph Addonizio, between 1964 and 1969. This was taking place during the general time frame of the 1967 Newark riots. The library was able to remain open through the help of federal aid funding. When the library was threatened with closure for the second time in 1969, a social movement of concerned citizens was able to put enough political pressure on the government in order to secure more funding.

In 1989, the library opened what is now the James Brown African American Room to "generate and maintain an appreciation of African American history and culture". Also in 1989, La Sala was established with the "largest collection of Spanish-language library resources in New Jersey.

In 2002, the library partnered with a Latino community group, the Friends of the Hispanic Research Information Center (HRIC), to create the New Jersey Hispanic Research and Information Center (NJHRIC).

In 2018, the library launched a digital collection a digital collection. In 2024 the library scanned Newark's newspaper of record the Newark Evening News.

== Main Library departments ==
- The Reference Center provides information on all subjects. This division serves as the statewide reference center for libraries researching art, business, music, patents and trademarks, and U.S. government documents questions.
- The Charles F. Cummings New Jersey Information Center provides New Jersey reference. It is home to many unique collections on Newark and New Jersey including books, photographs, microfilm and archives.
- The New Jersey Hispanic Research and Information Center consists of La Sala Hispanoamericana, the state's largest collection of Spanish Language books, the Hispanic Reference Collection, and the Puerto Rican Community Archives.
- Special Collections includes graphic and visual arts collections as diverse as fine prints, medieval manuscripts and shopping bags and was established by John Cotton Dana in 1902. Special Collections "preserves and provides access to thousands of extraordinary rare books, artists' books, fine prints and other works on paper in order to enhance the study of the visual arts and to inspire and encourage Newarkers to learn more about the graphic arts." Sub-collections held include the Advertising and Graphic Design, William J. Dane Fine Prints, Jenkinson Collection, Books and Periodicals, Autographs, Manuscripts, and Artist Information Files. As of 2019, Special Collections and "Fine Prints and Manuscripts Department of the Newark Public Library is currently unstaffed" and patrons are directed to contact specific departments for various collections.
- The James Brown African American Room was established to "document, preserve and foster the history, culture and literary achievements of African Americans".
- Other spaces in the main branch include the Children's Room, Teen Room, LGBTQ Center, and Special Services Room.

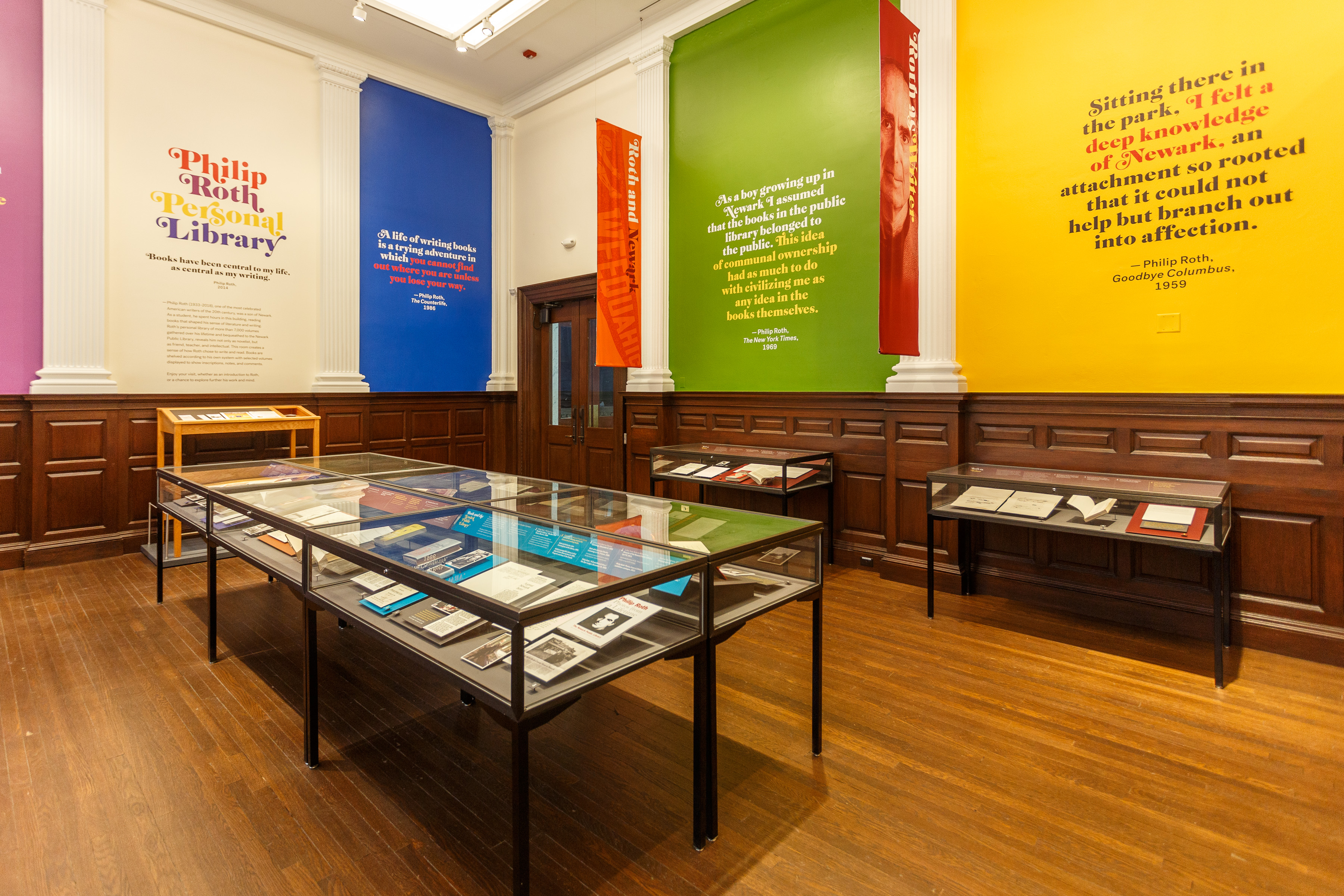
Philip Roth Personal Library

- The Philip Roth Personal Library consists of Roth's entire personal library of approximately 7,000 volumes, as well as an exhibit about Roth Novelist Philip Roth bequeathed $2 million and a large portion of his estate to the library upon his death in 2018. The collection includes Roth's personal correspondence, photographs, scrapbooks, furniture, travel itineraries, typewriters, and over 7,000 books by various authors, many of which include notations in Roth's handwriting. Roth cited a "longstanding sense of gratitude to the city where I was born" as motivation for his bequest. The Philip Roth Personal Library opened to the public in 2021.

== Architecture ==
The four-story Italian Renaissance-inspired Main Library building was designed by John Hall Rankin and Thomas M. Kellogg, drawing inspiration from the 15th century Palazzo Strozzi in Florence, Italy. Their intentions were to have the building not only serve as a library, but also as a museum, lecture hall, and gallery, that would provide cultural, as well as educational experiences in an aesthetically pleasing environment. The building structure includes an open center court/foyer with arches and mosaics that extended upward to a stained glass ceiling four stories high.

== Main Library expansion and renovations ==
The Main Library has been renovated many times since its founding. In 1922 and 1931 additions was completed. In 1927, a mural was painted on the 2nd floor – The Fountain of Knowledge – this mural still exists. In 1949 a 10,000 square foot maintenance building was added.

In 1952, a $1,500,000 renovation project modernized the building including covering the 2nd floor mural. From 1987 to 1888 another renovation took place—restoring the mural.

In 2006, renovations were carried out in the lobby, including new front doors. In 2010–2011 projects included new carpeting and painting. The Philip Roth Personal Library opened in 2021.

In spring 2021, the library received a grant from the State Library Construction Bond Act, with a project to update an older building. In 2022, the board of trustees voted to reallocate these funds to create a new space for the New Jersey Hispanic Research and Information Center on the 3rd floor of the Main Library and create a new Technology Center on the 1st floor. Construction is ongoing as of 2024.

== Library directors ==
- 1889–1901: Frank Pierce Hill
- 1902–1929: John Cotton Dana
- 1929–1942: Beatrice Winser
- 1943–1958: John Boyton Kaiser
- 1958–1972: James E Bryan
- 1972–1977: J. Bernard Schein
- 1977–1979: William Urban
- 1979–1987: Thomas J. Alrutz
- 1988–2004: Alex Boyd
- 2005–2015: Wilma Grey
- 2017–2019: Jeffrey Trzeciak
- 2020–2022: Joslyn Bowling Dixon
- 2023–2025: Christian Zabriskie

== Board of trustees ==
As of November 2026

- Ms. Aisha Cooper, President
- Dr. Rosemary Steinbaum, Vice President
- Havier Nazario – Representative for Superintendent of Schools, Roger Leon, Secretary
- Dr. Jason Ballard, Treasurer
- Dr. Sharnee Brown
- Dr. Robert J. Austin ll
- Mr. Miguel Rodriguez
- Dr. Lauren Wells
- Kimberly C. Clark, Representative for Mayor Ras Baraka

== Special programs ==
=== Truth, Racial Healing, and Transformation (TRHT) campus centers ===
After being selected by the Association of American College & Universities (AAC&U) to partake in the implementation of a Truth, Racial Healing, and Transformation (TRHT) campus centers, Rutgers University–Newark partnered with the library to aid in the development of the program. The AAC&U selected 10 universities to implement these programs and provided each a grant of $30,000. The goal is to bring to light the issues regarding racial inequality in diverse cities like Newark. Though selected in August 2017, the programs began on January 17, 2017, at the library and include events that addressed DACA and the Charlottesville Riots and used spoken word poetry and art as mediums.

=== Philip Roth lectures ===
Since 2016, the library has hosted an annual Philip Roth Lecture. Speakers have included George Packer, Zadie Smith, Robert Caro, Salman Rushdie, Sean Wilentz, Tracy K. Smith, Ayad Akhtar, Nikole Hannah-Jones, and Jelani Cobb.
