= Henry Jacob Winser =

American journalist and diplomat (1833–1896)

- Born: November 23, 1833; Bermuda
- Died: 1896
- Occupations: Journalist, diplomat

Henry Jacob Winser (November 23, 1833 – 1896) was an American journalist and diplomat. He is the father of librarian Beatrice Winser.

== Personal life ==
Winser was born on the island of Bermuda, November 23, 1833. His father, Francis J. Winser, was an officer in the British Navy. He attended Springfield Academy in Bermuda and then came to New York in 1851, entered a printing-office as proof-reader, and later became a reporter at the New York Times.

Winser married Edith Cox and together they had three children, one of whom was the librarian Beatrice Winser.

== Career ==
An illustration from Winser's 1883 guidebook, The Great Northwest

At the opening of the Civil War, Winser accompanied Colonel Ellsworth as military secretary, and afterward was war-correspondent of the Times. After the war he served for a period as city and night editor of the Times, and then as day-manager of the editorial department. In 1867, he attended the French exposition at Paris as regular correspondent for the Times, and made the trip to Cherbourg in the iron-clad Dunderberg. In May 1869, Winser was appointed United States consul at Sonneberg, Germany, and during his twelve years' service he made several valuable reports to the State Department, including one on forest-culture. In 1882, he was made chief of the bureau of information of the Northern Pacific railway company, but on the retirement of Henry Villard he returned to journalism, first as assistant editor of the New York Commercial Advertiser and afterward as managing editor of the Newark Advertiser.

In 1883, Winser and G.P. Putnam's Sons published The Great Northwest, a guide book for travelers that covered the northwestern United States.
