= Frank Pierce Hill =

American librarian (1855–1941)

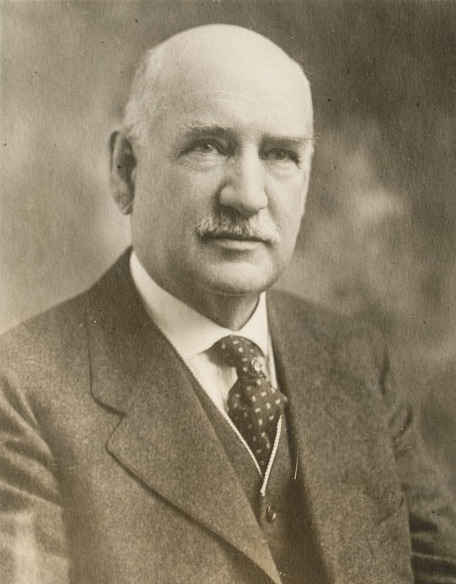

President of the American Library Association
- In office 1905–1906
- Preceded by: Ernest Cushing Richardson
- Succeeded by: Clement Walker Andrews

Personal details
- Born: August 22, 1855 Concord, New Hampshire, US
- Died: August 25, 1941 (aged 86) Hartford, Connecticut, US
- Education: Dartmouth College
- Occupation: Librarian

Frank Pierce Hill (August 22, 1855 – August 25, 1941) was an American librarian.

== Biography ==
Frank Pierce Hill was born in Concord, New Hampshire on August 22, 1855. He served as president of the American Library Association from 1905 to 1906, and the American Library Institute 1912 to 1915. Hill was the first director of the Newark Public Library from 1889 to 1901, when he left Newark to serve as Chief Librarian of the Brooklyn Public Library. Hill served in that position until his retirement in 1930. In 1940, he was awarded American Library Association Honorary Membership.

He died at his home in Hartford, Connecticut on August 25, 1941.

== Bibliography ==
- James Bertram; An Appreciation (Carnegie Corporation of New York), 1936
- American Plays printed 1714-1830 (Stanford University Press), 1934
- Library service for soldiers and sailors; the story of the million dollar campaign of the American library association, 1918

Non-profit organization positions
Preceded by Ernest Cushing Richardson	President of the American Library Association; 1905–1906	Succeeded by Clement Walker Andrews
