= American Library Institute =

Institute for the field of library theory and practice

- Abbreviation: ALI
- Formation: 1905
- Founder: Melvil Dewey
- Dissolved: 1951
- Type: Non-profit NGO
- Purpose: To provide for the investigation, study and discussion of issue within the field of library theory and practice.
- Members: Not to exceed 100

Established in 1905, the American Library Institute was an organization conceived by Melvil Dewey to provide for the investigation, study and discussion of issues within the field of library theory and practice. Its initial membership consisted of former presidents of the American Library Association (ALA) and other library professionals who had achieved notoriety which had been recognized by their peers.

== History ==
=== Formation ===
A pioneer in American librarianship and an influential figure in the development of libraries in America in the late 19th and early the 20th century, Melvil Dewey played a major role in the establishment of both the American Library Association and the National Association of State Libraries. In 1904, concerned about the size of the ALA, Dewey felt the need to establish a small library league or academy which would undertake the study of librarianship in the form of small meetings and discussions. This scholarly focus, in Dewey's opinion, was no longer practical under the growing membership of the ALA. The mandate of this new institution would be thought leadership and the formation and clarification of opinions relating to library issues. The resulting findings and recommendations were then to be published. The option and responsibility to take any specific actions resulting from these findings, fell to the ALA.

A proposal was presented to the ALA council in late 1904 and a committee of five was appointed to study the formation of the proposed academy. In July 1905, at a conference in Portland, OR, the ALA voted to establish the American Library Institute. While the proposed organization would not be under the formal control of the ALA, a committee was formed consisting of 15 former ALA presidents with a mandate to draft a constitution and by-laws and to develop a plan to launch the American Library Institute.

=== Membership ===
- Recognized library leaders and thinkers from English speaking America
- Former presidents of the American Library Association
- Not to exceed one hundred persons

=== Governing structure ===
- President (Board Chairman) - 2-year term
- Secretary-Treasurer - 2-year term
- Board of five members - 5-year term
- Members of ALA executive board to have seats at council
- Two meetings per year

First board included Melvil Dewey, President; Henry James Carr, Secretary-Treasurer; and James Hulme Canfield, Frederick M. Crunden, John C. Dana.

==== Presidents ====
- Melvil Dewey 1905-08 (ALA President 1890-93)
- Arthur E. Bostwick 1909-11, 1925-27 (ALA President 1907-08)
- Frank P. Hill 1912-15 (ALA President 1905-06)
- Ernest C. Richardson 1916-18 (ALA President 1904-05)
- William N.C. Carlton 1919-21
- Clement W. Andrews 1922-24
- Harry L. Koopman 1928-30
- Theodore W. Koch 1931-33
- Henry B. Van Hoesen 1934-36
- George B. Utley 1937-39
- Phineas L. Windsor 1940-

=== Dissolution ===
The committee that initially defined the membership along elitist lines designed an organization that could not maintain its longterm relevancy. Records of later meetings show personal opinion and preference entering into the decision making of the institute. Subsequently, by the end of the 1930s, the institute had become not much more than a debating society for retired librarians. During the second world war there was little activity within the organization and annual meetings were suspended in 1942. A single meeting was held in 1949 to vote on the issue of dissolution of the institute. The vote was finalized the following year and remaining funds were transferred to the American Library Association in early 1951.

== Notable activities ==
1910 - Advocation for the publication of standards relating to the organization of public libraries.

- Appointment of library board
- Details of library appropriation
- Accounting and finance
- Library property management
- Civil service relations

1931 - Symposium on Library Planning and Equipment.

== See also ==
- Harry Lyman Koopman Collection
- Phineas L. Windsor Papers
- Phineas L. Windsor - Meet the ACRL Presidents
- Henry B. Van Hoesen - Special Collections of Brown University Library, a history and guide: The 1930s and World War II
