= Dead Man's Chest =

Sea song with lyrics by Robert Louis Stevenson

"Dead Man's Chest" (also known as "Fifteen Men on the Dead Man's Chest" or "Yo, Ho, Ho (And a Bottle of Rum)") is a fictional (Note: Fictional sea-song - in this sense means a sea-song that first appeared in a work of fiction, and not an authentic sea song; however, this does not mean the song was not later sung in real life by real sailors. For a full treatment of the fictional origin of the song, "wholly original with Stevenson", see Starrett, Vincent (1970). Buried Caesars. AMS Press. pp. 189–204. ISBN 9780404062231.) sea song, (Note: Many sources call "Dead Man's Chest" a sea chanty, however Stevenson himself never called it that, rather the novel says it's a "sea-song" and a "sailor's song". Sea-song is described in the Oxford English Dictionary as "A song such as is sung by sailors." (sea-song, n.; Second edition, 1989). The OED defines shanty as "A sailor's song, esp. one sung during heavy work." The OED has no entry for sailor's song. Since the terms Stevenson used are oblique, it is a matter of interpretation if Stevenson meant it to be a shanty, or not.) originally from Robert Louis Stevenson's novel Treasure Island (1883). It was expanded in a poem, titled "Derelict" by Young E. Allison, published in the Louisville Courier-Journal in 1891. It has since been used in many later works of art in various forms.

== Background ==
Stevenson found the name "Dead Man's Chest" among a list of Virgin Island names in a book by Charles Kingsley, possibly in reference to the Dead Chest Island off Peter Island in the British Virgin Islands. (Note: The relevant quote from At Last the first of those numberless isles which Columbus, so goes the tale, discovered on St. Ursula's day, and named them after the Saint and her eleven thousand mythical virgins. Unfortunately, English buccaneers have since then given to most of them less poetic names. The Dutchman's Cap, Broken Jerusalem, The Dead Man's Chest, Rum Island, and so forth, mark a time and a race more prosaic, but still more terrible, though not one whit more wicked and brutal, than the Spanish Conquistadores) As Stevenson once said, "Treasure Island came out of Kingsley's At Last: A Christmas in the West Indies (1871); where I got the 'Dead Man's Chest'—that was the seed." That is, Stevenson saw the three words "Dead Man's Chest" in Kingsley's book among a list of names, germinating in Stevenson's mind it was the "seed", which then grew into the novel.

== Original song ==
In Treasure Island, Stevenson only wrote the chorus, leaving the remainder of the song unwritten, and to the reader's imagination:

Fifteen men on the dead man's chest—
...Yo-ho-ho, and a bottle of rum!
Drink and the devil had done for the rest—
...Yo-ho-ho, and a bottle of rum!

Another lyric is in the novel in Chapter 23:

But one man of her crew alive,
What put to sea with seventy-five.

This lyric also occurs in Chapter 34, where it is "With one man of the crew alive". It is referred to as "that other ship [the pirates] sang about", and it being part of "a dull, old, droning sailor's song". Stevenson does not make clear if these lyrics are part of "Dead Man's Chest" or another fictional song entirely.

== Variations and other usage ==
The song was expanded into a 3-verse poem by Young E. Allison, titled "Derelict", published in the Louisville Courier-Journal in 1891.

Other variations of the poem were printed in the late 19th and early 20th centuries that claimed to be folklore, but in reality were nothing more than new extensions from Stevenson's original. One appeared in the Chicago Times-Herald named "Stevenson's Sailor Song" by an anonymous author, who claimed to hear it being sung on the "wharfs of Chicago" by a group of "old time sailors," who when asked where they learned it, replied "We never learned it nowhere, we allers knowed it." The story was meant as a hoax but some took it seriously. Another appeared in print as "Billy Bones's Fancy", supposedly pieced together from various "fragments," suggesting an antiquated origin, but in fact it was an adaptation of the Times-Herald piece. As Stevenson's stepson Osbourne once said, "'Fifteen-Men' was wholly original with Stevenson," and as Stevenson himself said, the book At Last by Kingsley was "the seed" of his invention.

The song has been widely used in the arts for over a century. In 1901, music was added by Henry Waller to the lyrics of Allison's "Derelict" for a Broadway rendition of Treasure Island. In the 1954 film Return to Treasure Island, starring Robert Newton, the song was sung in the opening credits, and instrumentally as the thematic background to the action. In 1956, Ed McCurdy released his version of the song on his Elektra Records album Blood, Booze and Bones.

In the 1959 television series The Adventures of Long John Silver—again starring Robert Newton—it was, although only in instrumental version, the series' theme song played both at the beginning and the end of each episode. In 1967, writers for the Walt Disney film company found inspiration in "Derelict" for the sea-song "Yo Ho (A Pirate's Life for Me)", which was played in the "Pirates of the Caribbean" theme ride at Disneyland. Astrid Lindgren expanded Stevenson's couplet differently in the script for the 1969 Pippi Longstocking TV series. Alan Moore made a play on the song in the 1986 graphic novel Watchmen; the chapter is called "One man on fifteen dead men's chests." In 1993, the contemporary "pirate" vocal group, The Jolly Rogers, recorded Mark Stahl's arrangement of Young E. Allison's lyrics, re-released in 1997 on their CD titled "Pirate Gold". A rendition was recorded by the steampunk band Abney Park as "The Derelict". In the second Pirates of the Caribbean film, Joshamee Gibbs sang the original version from Treasure Island—a fourth wall joke, as the film was called Pirates of the Caribbean: Dead Man's Chest.

In German, the song is sometimes known as either "17 Mann auf des toten Manns Kiste", mentioning two more men, or "13 Mann", mentioning two fewer, most prominently in Michael Ende's Jim Knopf stories. Likewise, in the Hungarian translation of Treasure Island, the phrase is "seven (men) on a dead man's chest"; apparently these numbers provided the closest effect to the original regarding rhyme and syllables in English.

Many authors have written prequels and sequels to Treasure Island. One such example is R. F. Delderfield's The Adventures of Ben Gunn (1956), in which Ben tells Jim Hawkins that the song is a reference to "an island of the Leewards" nicknamed "Dead Man's Chest" which "was little more than a long, high rock, shaped like a coffin." In Delderfield's story, the song is about 15 pirates who shipwrecked there who had salvaged many barrels of rum but almost no food, and were "all raving drunk" upon their rescue.

Fernando Pessoa (1888–1935), the Portuguese poet, quotes several passages from the Stevenson's poem in "Maritime ode" (Ode Marítima), adding a long paraphrase about "The Great Pirate's Song".
