= Putnam Classification System =

Library classification system

The Putnam Classification System is a library classification system developed by George Herbert Putnam.

Putnam was the librarian at the Minneapolis Athenaeum in 1887. When that became the Minneapolis Public Library, Putnam wanted a way to democratize the collection and make it available to the public. He developed a handwritten system of classification, dividing the books into categories and subcategories. He even came up with uniform handwriting examples. The letters were written on the spine of the books in white paint. The system for shelving is in a zigzag pattern.

The system is still in use in parts of the Hennepin County Library.

Putnam went on to become the Librarian of Congress, where he retooled his system and developed the current Library of Congress Classification system.
