= Ernest Cushing Richardson =

United States librarian, theologian and scholar

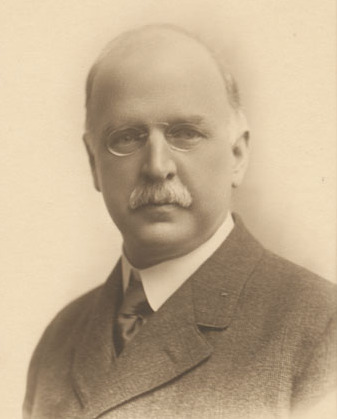

President of the American Library Association
- In office 1904–1905
- Preceded by: Herbert Putnam
- Succeeded by: Frank Pierce Hill

Personal details
- Born: February 9, 1860 Woburn, Massachusetts, USA
- Died: June 3, 1939 (aged 79) Old Lyme, Connecticut, US
- Cause of death: Angina pectoris
- Resting place: Lyme, Connecticut, US
- Spouse: Grace Duncan Ely (m. 1891; died 1933)
- Education: Amherst College
- Occupation: Librarian

Ernest Cushing Richardson (February 9, 1860 – June 3, 1939) was an American librarian, theologian and scholar. Throughout his life Richardson strived to make advances in cataloging systems and increased access to necessary research materials in U.S. libraries. He was named one of the "100 Most Important Leaders [Librarians] had in the 20th Century" by American Libraries in 1999.

== Early life and education ==
Richardson was born into a middle-class family in Woburn, Massachusetts. His father, James Cushing, and mother, Lydia Bartlett Taylor Richardson, were of English descent. As a child, Ernest has been described as athletic. He was most passionate about baseball, ice skating and hiking and continued to enjoy them throughout his life.

Richardson began his higher education at Amherst College in September 1876. To support his studies financially he worked as a student assistant in the library and also as a pin-setter for a local bowling alley. He also applied for and received scholarships, which he "...secured by virtue of a good academic record and seriousness of purpose." During Richardson's first year at Amherst, Melvil Dewey was an assistant librarian. Dewey was followed by W.S. Biscoe, who worked with Dewey on the Dewey Decimal System. It has been suggested by Lewis C. Branscomb, Richardson's primary biographer, that these librarians influenced Richardson in his enthusiasm for classification methods.

Richardson was promoted to assistant librarian at Amherst during his senior year. Throughout his academic career he maintained a good grade-point average, so that when he graduated on July 2, 1880, he did so with Phi Beta Kappa honors.

== Hartford Theological Seminary ==
After graduating from Amherst, Richardson accepted a part-time position at Hartford Theological Seminary as a student assistant under Dr. Chester David Hartranft, one of the founders of the American Library Association. While at the Hartford Theological Seminary, Richardson was granted leave to travel to Europe. It was on his various trips throughout Europe that Richardson was able to study, examine and collect many significant books, manuscripts and documents. These studies helped to support Richardson's belief that U.S. libraries lacked serious research materials. Three years into his career at Hartford Seminary, Richardson was given an honorary M.A. from Amherst College, which was common practice for the institution at the time (given to graduates who had furthered their professional or liberal studies for two or more years). Richardson was promoted to librarian with faculty rank in 1884, and again in 1888 to associate professor. He received an honorary PhD from Washington and Jefferson College for his work in bibliography on June 13, 1988.

== Princeton years ==
Following years of service to the library at Hartford Theological Seminary, Richardson accepted a position at Princeton University, then known as The College of New Jersey. Richardson had been offered jobs on numerous occasions, however his commitment to the Hartford Theological Seminary, and his own personal commitment to his religious studies made the positions unappealing until promises of wage raises were not fulfilled. Princeton University offered Richardson a salary that doubled his wages at the Hartford Theological Seminary Library. Richardson accepted the position at Princeton in 1890. The following year Richardson married Grace Duncan Ely on June 30. Her father was a wealthy New York coffee broker and the inheritance Grace received after her father's death enabled Richardson to remain semi-independent of his salary for the remainder of his life.

While at Princeton, Richardson was able to increase the library's collection and facilities several times. He was also able to conduct experiments in cataloging. One of these experiments was his “Title-a-Bar” theory, in which books were given a single line for their title on book lists and subject lists. Richardson believed that the time saved in looking through catalogs at a single line and cataloging new texts with a single line increased productivity and allowed resources to be entered into the library system and accessed more easily.

Unfortunately, not everyone at Princeton agreed with Richardson's method of cataloging. His system, often referred to as the “Princeton System” relied on whole numbers and minute specifications for classification, resulting in a lengthy cataloging number. And, after many years of service to the Princeton University faculty, staff and students, Richardson was confronted with a group of opposing faculty, who believed that Richardson was not properly performing his duties and that funds were being disposed of inefficiently. A committee was formed to investigate these accusations, of which Richardson was cleared, and it was recommended that the school give the library more funds. This positive opinion did not last, and J.T. Gerould was appointed librarian and the new position of director was created for Richardson without a salary increase. Tensions grew when Richardson traveled abroad and was docked part of his salary, even though he carried out work for the library and had always been compensated previously. To make matters worse, Gerould changed Richardson's “Title-a-Bar” and “Princeton System” to “Full-form” cataloging and the “Library of Congress System,” while Richardson was abroad. Conflicts between Gerould and Richardson continued and, in 1925, Richardson retired from Princeton and accepted an offer from the Library of Congress as an Honorary Consultant in Bibliography.

Princeton libraries stopped using Richardson's method for new acquisitions in the 1960s. In 2010, the Firestone Library began completing a switch to the Library of Congress Classification system, though books classified according to the Richardson method remained in other Princeton libraries.

== Later years ==
Richardson worked for the Library of Congress as a consultant without compensation until 1934, at which point several conflicts and his unwillingness to compromise demanded his resignation from the Library of Congress, the American Library Association in 1934, the American Library Institute in 1935 and the Institut Francais de Washington in 1936. Richardson's wife, Grace, died on October 29, 1933, following which he rented their home in Princeton and resided mainly in their cottage “High Pastures” in Old Lyme, Connecticut. He began to collapse and disperse his personal library, approximately 15,000 volumes, to the Library of Congress, the Army Medical Library and the Brick Row Bookshop in New York City. On June 29, 1939, Richardson died of angina pectoris, and was buried in the Ely family plot near Lyme, Connecticut.

Non-profit organization positions
| Preceded by Herbert Putnam | President of the American Library Association; 1904–1905 | Succeeded by Frank Pierce Hill |
