= Charles Henry Gould =

Canadian librarian

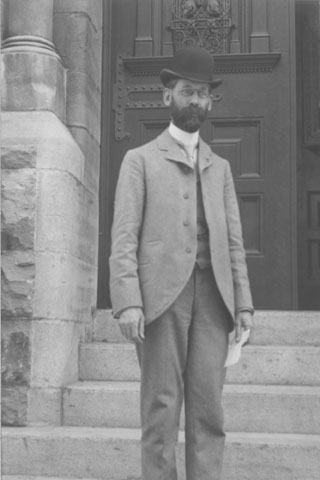
- Gould in 1900

President of the American Library Association
- In office 1908–1909
- Preceded by: Arthur Elmore Bostwick
- Succeeded by: Nathaniel Dana Carlile Hodges

Personal details
- Born: December 6, 1855
- Died: July 30, 1919 (aged 63)
- Education: McGill University
- Occupation: Librarian; musician

Charles Henry Gould (December 6, 1855 – July 30, 1919) was a Canadian librarian and musician.

== Education ==
Gould attended the High School of Montreal and McGill University, receiving his bachelor's degree in 1877. He started graduate work in physics but never took a further degree. From 1880 to 1887 he was the organist of the American Presbyterian Church in Montreal.

== Career ==
In 1892, Gould was appointed as the first university librarian at McGill University. Gould began his service as librarian by traveling through Europe and the United States to learn library administration.

Gould contributed greatly to Canadian culture, scholarship, and librarianship. He hosted the American Library Association's annual meeting in Montreal in 1900 and during that meeting participated in founding the first Canadian library association which became the Ontario Library Association. Gould started the first bibliographical control system for Canadian science. In 1904 Gould started a summer school that became the McGill Library School. Gould is credited with the creation of the modern system of interlibrary loan. In 1916 he chaired the committee of the ALA that produced the first policies for interlibrary loan among libraries.

Gould served as the first Canadian president of the American Library Association from 1908 to 1909. During his tenure, he oversaw the relocation of the ALA headquarters from Boston to Chicago and the adoption of a new constitution for the Association.

Gould was president of the Bibliographical Society of America from 1912 to 1913.

== See also ==
- McGill University Library
- American Library Association
- interlibrary loan

Non-profit organization positions
Preceded by Arthur Elmore Bostwick	President of the American Library Association; 1908–1909	Succeeded by Nathaniel Dana Carlile Hodges
