= James Ingersoll Wyer =

American librarian & educator (1869–1955)

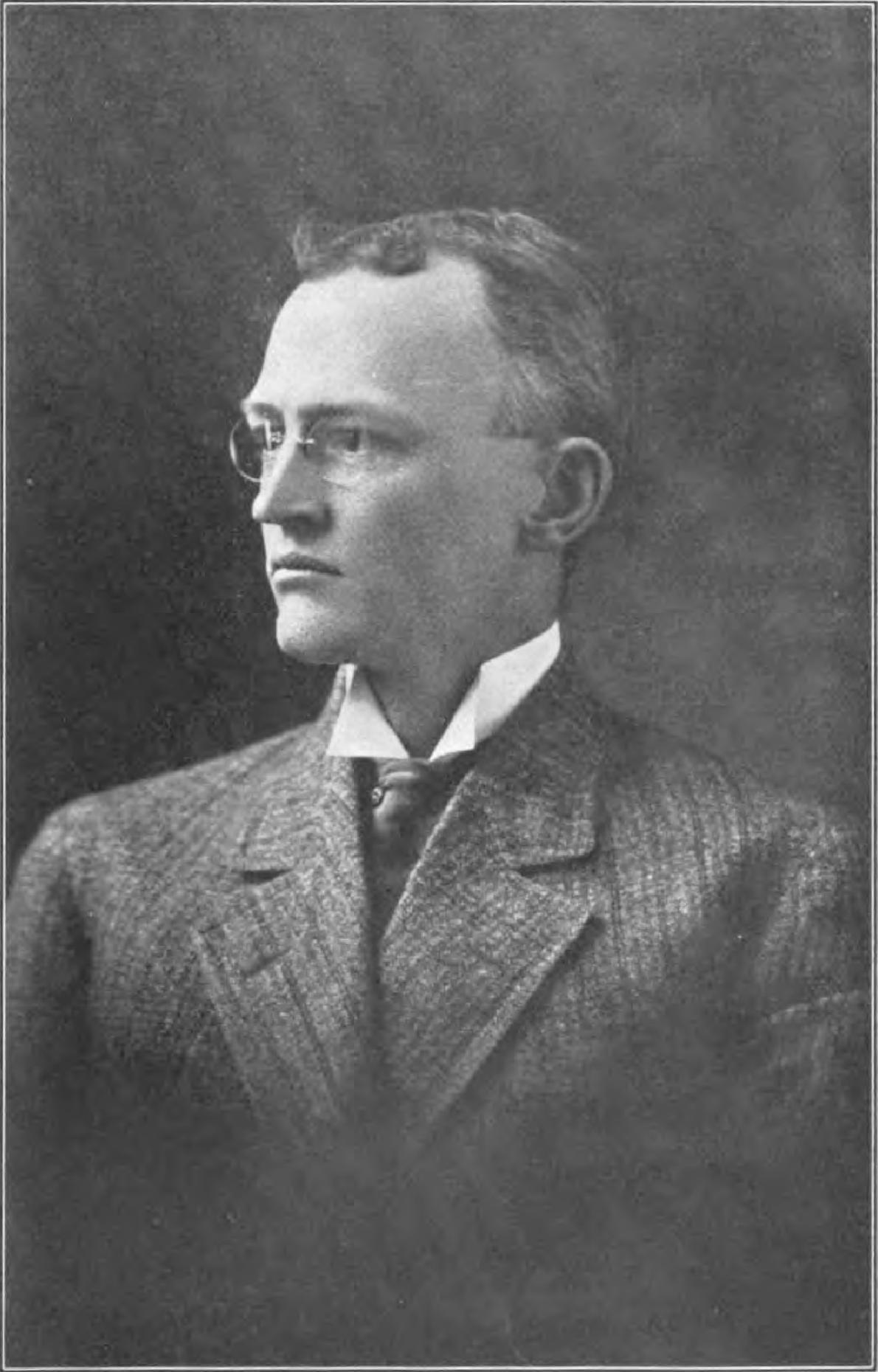
- Wyer in 1911

President of the American Library Association
- In office 1910–1911
- Preceded by: Nathaniel Dana Carlile Hodges
- Succeeded by: Theresa West Elmendorf

Personal details
- Born: May 14, 1869 Red Wing, Minnesota, USA
- Died: November 1, 1955 (aged 86) Salt Lake City, Utah, US
- Occupation: Librarian

James Ingersoll Wyer (May 14, 1869 – November 1, 1955) was an American librarian and educator.

== Biography ==
Wyer earned his bachelor's degree from the New York State Library School in 1898 and accepted a position at the University of Nebraska. In Nebraska, Wyer took leadership roles in professional library associations and published a guidebook to government documents. Wyer returned to Albany, New York, receiving his master's degree in 1905 and his PhD in 1919. He held several positions of progressive responsibility in the New York State Library and its library school.

From 1916 to 1920, Wyer chaired the Library War Service Committee of the American Library Association, which was a campaign to raise funds to maintain libraries in military camps, vessels, and ports. He was the first president of the Association for Library and Information Science Education (ALISE), serving from 1915-1916 (the association was called the "Association of American Library Schools" at that time). Wyer later served as president of the American Library Association from 1921 to 1922. In 1930, Wyer authored a textbook on reference practices, "Reference Work: A Textbook for Students of Library Work and Librarians." Wyer retired as Director of the New York State Library in 1938. He retired to Salt Lake City, Utah. In Utah, Wyer continued to be an active contributor to library journals until an illness in 1950.

Non-profit organization positions
Preceded by Nathaniel Dana Carlile Hodges	President of the American Library Association; 1910–1911	Succeeded by Theresa West Elmendorf
