= Chicago Literary Club =

The Chicago Literary Club is a society founded in 1874 at which members orally deliver essays they have written, and listen to the essays of other members. All members must be skilled in English, though most are not professional writers. The Chicago Literary Club is one of Chicago's two oldest surviving literary clubs (the other being the Fortnightly Club). The club was originally for men only, but today accepts both women and men.
