= Beatrice Winser =

American librarian

- Born: March 11, 1869; Newark, New Jersey
- Died: September 14, 1947 (aged 78)
- Education: Studied English, French, and German in Germany
- Alma mater: Columbia University Library School
- Occupations: Librarian, museum director
- Organization(s): Newark Public Library, Newark Museum

Beatrice Winser (March 11, 1869 – September 14, 1947) was an American librarian. She spent 53 years at the Newark Public Library in Newark, New Jersey and was its third librarian, from 1929 to 1942.

== Early life ==
Winser was the eldest child of Henry Jacob Winser, an American newspaper reporter and diplomat, and Edith Cox Winser, daughter of physician Dr. Henry G. Cox and herself a newspaper contributor. Her sister Nathalie, born in Coburg in March 1877, was a deaconess in the Episcopal Church. Soon after Winser's birth in Newark, New Jersey, Henry Winser left The New York Times for a post as consul to Saxe-Coburg and Gotha, which he held until 1881. Winser was educated in Germany and learned English, French, and German.

== Career ==
Winser attended the Columbia College School of Library Economy in 1888, the first library school in the United States, founded by Melvil Dewey and first open to students the previous year. She joined the Newark Public Library as a French and German cataloger in 1889. In 1894, she became assistant librarian under Frank P. Hill, the first librarian of the Newark Public Library. Hill left in 1901 to run the Brooklyn Public Library, leaving Winser in charge of the library for seven months. While conceding that Winser was qualified for the job, the trustees preferred a male librarian for the position and John Cotton Dana assumed the position in 1902. Despite the inauspicious beginning, Winser and Dana had a productive working relationship until his death in 1929. During this time, she became the first woman in Newark to join a governing body when in 1915 she became a member of the Newark Board of Education. She also campaigned against restrictions preventing women from working in military libraries during World War I, served as president of the New Jersey Library Association, from 1907-1908 and 1921-1922, and in 1923 campaigned against state labor legislation that would prevent women from working during the evening hours.

Winser assumed leadership of the Library and the Newark Museum, which Dana founded in 1909. She headed both institutions during the Great Depression, which strained budgets and required scaling back services and renovations. In the 1930s, she served as chair of the New Jersey Art Division of the Works Progress Administration, was active in the campaign against appointing Archibald MacLeish as Librarian of Congress due to his lack of professional library experience, involved in the foundation of Dana College and was awarded an honorary LL.D. after its merger with the University of Newark, and fought against censorship of foreign materials by the United States Customs Service.

During World War II, Winser presided over efforts to satisfy new information needs due to the war and to provide books to soldiers. In 1942, she resigned from the library, citing the interference of trustees in management of the library, namely overriding personnel assignments. She continued to head the Newark Museum until shortly before her death in 1947 of heart disease. Her funeral was held at Trinity Cathedral in Newark and she was buried at the Green-Wood Cemetery in Brooklyn.
