= Jens Christian Bay =

Danish-American writer and librarian (1871–1962)

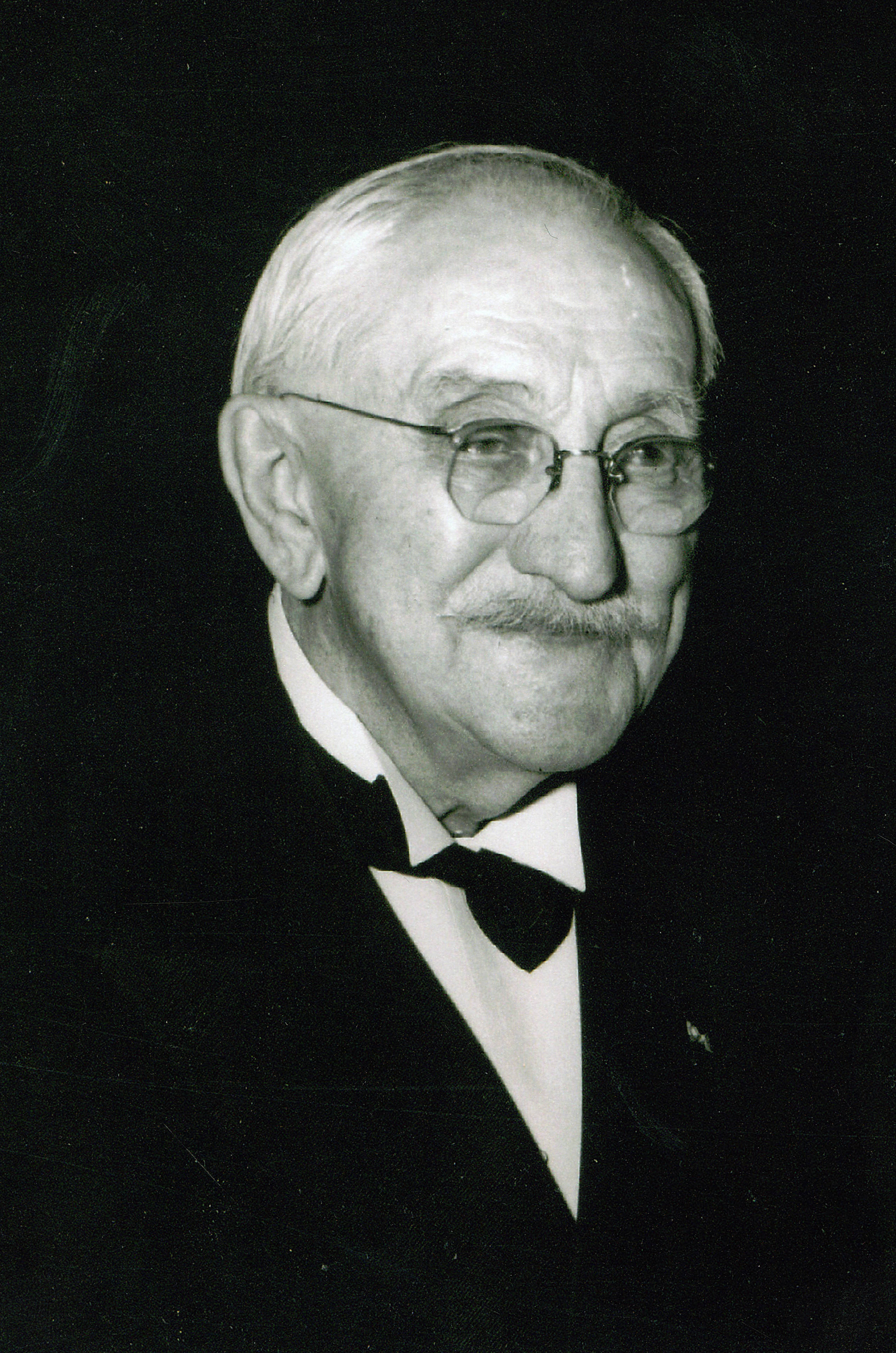
- Born: October 12, 1871; Rudkøbing
- Died: April 11, 1962 (aged 90); Elmhurst
- Resting place: Mount Emblem Cemetery
- Alma mater: University of Copenhagen
- Occupation: Librarian, bibliographer
- Employer: John Crerar Library; Library of Congress; Missouri Botanical Garden
- Awards: Order of the Dannebrog

Jens Christian Bay (October 12, 1871 – April 11, 1962) was a Danish American writer and librarian.

== Biography ==
Jens Christian Bay was born in Rudkøbing, Denmark to Lars Hansen Bay (1828–1894) and Doris Oline Jørgine Christiansen (1828–1908). Bay came to the United States in 1892 and took a position with the Missouri Botanical Garden in St. Louis. He later worked for the Library of Congress and, in 1905 became a librarian at the University of Chicago. From 1928 to 1947 he was chief librarian of the John Crerar Library in Chicago.

Bay was recognized as an authority on many subjects, including rare books, but was particularly interested in botany, English literature, and the history of the American Midwest. He was a long-time friend of Young E. Allison, an author and newspaper editor of Louisville, Kentucky. Bay and Allison shared a variety of interests, including the history of Kentucky, Stephen Foster, James Whitcomb Riley, Robert Louis Stevenson, and Charles Dickens. Bay was also interested in the literature of his native Denmark, and was knighted by King Frederik IX in 1947.

== Selected works ==
- Danish Fairy & Folktales, 1899
- Bibliographies of Botany, 1909
- Denmark in English and American Literature: A Bibliography, 1915
- Bay, Jens Christian (1963) [1916 Bibliographical Society of America]. Conrad Gesner (1516–1565), the Father of Bibliography: An Appreciation. Kraus Reprint Corporation.
- Echoes of Robert Louis Stevenson, 1920
- Rare and Beautiful Imprints of Chicago, 1922
- The Chalice of the Chipped Ruby, 1922
- The Manuscripts of Robert Louis Stevenson's Records of a Family of Engineers, 1929
- Om Danskhedens Vaesen, 1933
- A Handful of Western Books, 1935
- A Second Handful of Western Books, 1936
- A Third Handful of Western Books, 1937
- The Dummy Library of Charles Dickens at Gad's Hill Place, 1937
- The Pickwick Papers: Some Bibliographical Remarks, 1938
- The Fortune of Books, 1941
- A Heroine of the Frontier: Miriam Davis Colt in Kansas, 1856, 1941
- The Mystery of the Irish Crown Jewels, 1944
- The John Crerar Library, 1895-1944: An Historical Report Prepared under the Authority of the Board of Directors by the Librarian, 1945
- In the House of Memories, 1946
- Journeys and Voyages to Nature: A Survey of One Hundred Books, 1950
- The Bookman is a Hummingbird: Book Collecting in the Middle West and the House of Walter M. Hill, 1952
- Mississippi: Pennestrog om Amerikas Kinge-AA, 1952
- God Speede the Plough, 1953
- George Washington: Citizen and Farmer, 1956
- Bog-Ormen Vejer Videnskab og Visdom: En Laegmands Betragtninger, 1958
- Tvende Verdener Modes: En Udvandrerlaeges Minder, 1960
- Livet Laerte Mig, 1950 (contributor)

== Other sources ==
- "Dr. Jens C. Bay Dies; Famed in Library Field," Chicago Tribune, April 13, 1962, pg. B14.
- Lawrence Sydney Thompson, Jens Christian Bay, Bibliologist, 1963.
- Selected Works of Young E. Allison, Louisville, Ky.: John P. Morton, 1935.
