= A History of the Book in America =

2000–2010 series of scholarly books

- Volume 1
- Language: English
- Subject: book history
- Publisher: University of North Carolina Press
- ISBN: 978-1-4696-2164-7

A History of the Book in America is a five-volume series of scholarly books of essays published 2000–2010 by the University of North Carolina Press, and edited by David D. Hall. Topics include printing, publishing, book selling, reading, and other aspects of print culture in colonial America and the United States. Among the contributing writers: Hugh Amory, Georgia B. Barnhill, Paul S. Boyer, Richard D. Brown, Scott E. Casper, Charles E. Clark, James P. Danky, Ann Fabian, James N. Green, Robert A. Gross, Jeffrey D. Groves, David D. Hall, Mary Kelley, E. Jennifer Monaghan, Janice Radway, James Raven, Elizabeth Carroll Reilly, Joan Shelley Rubin, Michael Schudson, David S. Shields, Wayne A. Wiegand, Michael Winship.

== Volumes ==
1. Hugh Amory; David D. Hall, eds. (2000), The Colonial Book in the Atlantic World, A History of the Book in America, vol. 1, Chapel Hill: University of North Carolina Press, ISBN 9780807868003, OL 25415240M, 0807868000 online copy
2. Robert A. Gross; Mary Kelley, eds. (2010), An Extensive Republic: Print, Culture, and Society in the New Nation, 1790-1840, A History of the Book in America, vol. 2, Chapel Hill: University of North Carolina Press, ISBN 9780807833391, 0807833398 online copy
3. Scott E. Casper; Jeffrey D. Groves; Stephen W. Nissenbaum; et al., eds. (2007), The Industrial Book, 1840-1880, A History of the Book in America, vol. 3, Chapel Hill: University of North Carolina Press, ISBN 9780807830857, OL 9892598M, 0807830852--online copy
4. Carl F. Kaestle; Janice A. Radway, eds. (2009), Print in Motion: The Expansion of Publishing and Reading in the United States, 1880-1940, A History of the Book in America, vol. 4, Chapel Hill: University of North Carolina Press, ISBN 9780807831861, OL 25415239M, 0807831867 --online copy
5. David Paul Nord; Joan Shelley Rubin; Michael Schudson, eds. (2009), The Enduring Book: Print Culture in Postwar America, A History of the Book in America, vol. 5, Chapel Hill: Published in association with the American Antiquarian Society by the University of North Carolina Press, ISBN 9780807832851, OCLC 261174626, 0807832855--online copy

== See also ==
- Publishing#United States
- Books in the United States
- History of the book
