= From Woodblocks to the Internet =

2010 non-fiction book

- Editors: Cynthia Brokaw, Christopher A. Reed
- Series: Sinica Leidensia
- Publisher: Brill
- Publication date: 7 October 2010
- Pages: 440
- ISBN: 978-90-04-18527-2
- Dewey Decimal: 070

From Woodblocks to the Internet: Chinese Publishing and Print Culture in Transition, circa 1800 to 2008 is a 2010 collection of essays edited by Cynthia Brokaw and Cristopher Reed. The anthology details the history of Chinese publishing, printing, and print culture from the High Qing to the modern People's Republic.

== Background ==
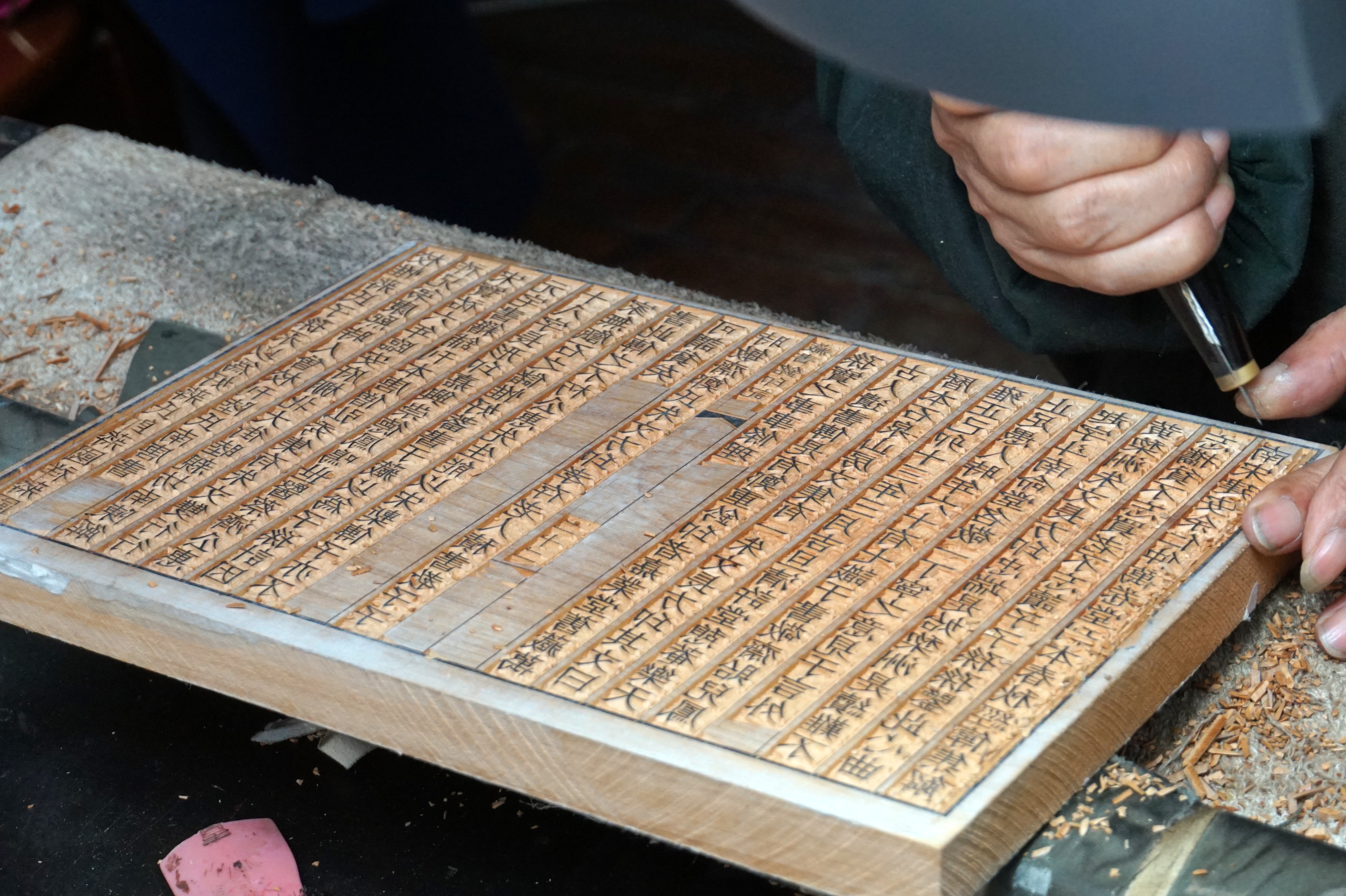
Modern demonstration of carving for woodblock printing

From Woodblocks to the Internet is a collection of essays on the history of publishing and print culture in modern China, beginning in the High Qing and continuing with a deeper focus on the modern era. American sinologists Cynthia Brokaw and Christopher A. Reed edited the volume. Twelve authors, including Brokaw and Reed, provided essays for the book. Brokaw had previously published about Chinese print history, editing Printing and Book Culture in Late Imperial China in 2005 alongside Kai-Wing Chow and authoring Commerce in Culture: The Sibao Book Trade in the Qing and Republican Periods in 2007. Reed, also a specialist in Chinese print culture and history, had published Gutenberg in Shanghai in 2004, detailing the history of Shanghai's publishing and print industry from 1876 to 1937.

Brokaw and Reed organized an international conference entitled "From Woodblocks to the Internet: Chinese Publishing and Print Culture in Transition". It was held at Ohio State University in November 2004, with literary historian Harvey J. Graff giving the keynote address on connections in the study of western and Chinese print culture. Papers from conference participants were collected and revised to form the essays in Woodblocks to the Internet. British sinologist Daria Berg, who was invited to the conference but was unable to attend, also submitted an essay for the book.

== Synopsis ==
The book opens with an introductory essay written by Reed discussing the evolution of Chinese printing and its technological development. He dates the birth of modern print culture to the 1870s, with the spread of lithography and letterpress printing in lieu of traditional woodblock printing. Reed's introduction and many of the collected essays stress the socioeconomic, political, and cultural factors which transformed Chinese print culture, rejecting a narrative centered purely around the introduction of western printing technology.

=== Essays ===
The twelve essays of the main body of the book are divided into four sections. The first, "Modern Print Culture in Perspective", describes Chinese print culture in the 19th century, arguing that elements of print modernization emerged prior to the introduction of western print technology in the 1870s. "New Technologies and the Transition to Modern Print Culture" details specific communities of readers and writers that developed during the late Qing period. "The Golden Age of Print Capitalism" describes the print and publishing industries of the Republican era. The final section, "Print in the Internet Era", describes the effects of the internet on print culture in the early 21st century People's Republic of China.

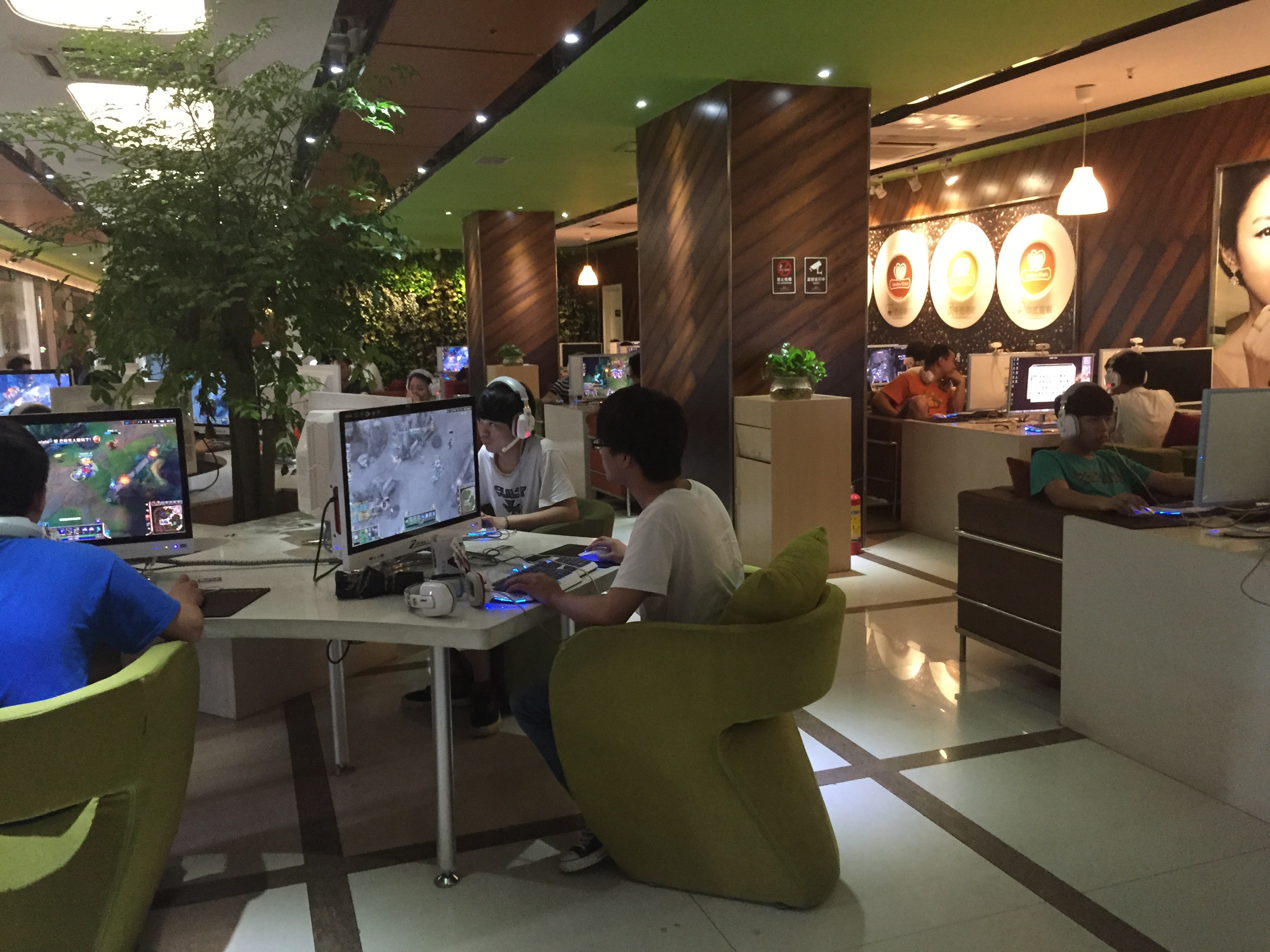
Internet cafés provide access to online content for many Chinese

== Reception ==
Reviewers praised From Woodblocks to the Internet for its breadth of coverage and inclusion of emerging digital publishing. Sinologist John E. Willis Jr. stated that the section on internet media was "an excellent idea, but it has not been very energetically developed", noting that it was short in comparison to other sections of the book. Multiple reviewers questioned the anthology's minimal coverage of the early People's Republic, with the 1949–1990 era only briefly mentioned during Reed's introduction. Although praising the book for its summary of state influence on the evolution of Chinese publishing, Kai-Wing Chow criticized Reed's concept of "print communism" as incoherent, suggesting that it would be better described as "communist print culture".
