= Pillars of the Republic =

1983 book by Carl Kaestle

- Author: Carl Kaestle
- Subject: History of American education
- Published: 1983 (Hill & Wang)
- Pages: 266
- ISBN: 0-80907-620-9
- LC Class: LA215 K33 1983

Pillars of the Republic is history book on the origins of the American common schools written by Carl Kaestle and published by Hill & Wang in 1983.

Rebecca Brooks Gruver of Hunter College described the book as "a comprehensive and [...] concise history" of how public schooling developed in a "common" fashion in the United States. Thedore R. Mitchell of Dartmouth College stated that additionally, the book includes "the state of educational history".

There are eight major chapters. Five of them cover the range 1830–1860.

== Reception ==
Harvey J. Graff wrote that the book "is an elegant and admirable work of historical synthesis".

Gruver stated the book is "gracefully written and informative".

Mitchell stated that the book is "a careful, detailed, and persuasive analysis" of how American education developed; he criticized how the "treatment of regional variation" is a "serious weakness".

Johann N. Neem of Western Washington University stated that the book had a strong role in showing light on the social history of American education, which had relatively little coverage before, and that the book "made sense for an era when Americans were losing faith in their institutions." Neem, in 2016, argued that there were newer more up to date sources.

== See also ==
- History of education in the United States: Bibliography
