= Religious Freedom Act =

The Religious Freedom Act was an 1811 law passed by the Great and General Court of Massachusetts. It repudiated a decision made by Chief Justice Theophilus Parsons in the case of Barnes v. The First Parish in Falmouth. The law ensured that citizens could use their tax dollars to support the church of their choice, not just the one officially sponsored by their community.

== Works cited ==
- Wright, Conrad (1988). "The Dedham Case Revisited". Proceedings of the Massachusetts Historical Society. 3. 100. Massachusetts Historical Society: 15–39. JSTOR 25080991.
- Neem, Johann N. (2004). "The Elusive Common Good: Religion and Civil Society in Massachusetts, 1780-1833". Journal of the Early Republic. 24 (3). Society for Historians of the Early American Republic: 381–417. JSTOR 4141439.
