= Rosemarie Zagarri =

American historian

- Spouses: Jefferson Morley; William T. Gormley, Jr.

Academic background
- Education: Yale University

Academic work
- Discipline: History
- Institutions: West Virginia University; Catholic University of America; George Mason University

Rosemarie Zagarri is a distinguished American historian who specializes in the study of early American political history, women's and gender history, and global history. She is a Distinguished University Professor and professor of history at George Mason University in Fairfax, Virginia. The recipient of numerous grants, awards, and national recognitions, she was president of the Society for Historians of the Early American Republic from 2009 to 2010.

== Life ==
Zagarri grew up in St. Louis, Missouri, the eldest of six children. She was married to the writer Jefferson Morley from 1985 to 1994 and to Professor William T. Gormley, Jr. of Georgetown University from 1998 to the present. She has two children.

== Career ==
Zagarri received her Ph.D. from Yale University where she was the last doctoral student of the eminent early American historian, Edmund S. Morgan. She was an Assistant Professor of History at West Virginia University from 1984 to 1987; and Assistant and Associate Professor (with tenure) of History at the Catholic University of America from 1987 to 1994; and Associate Professor and Professor of History at George Mason University from 1997 to 2013. In 2013, she was appointed University Professor of History, the highest faculty rank at GMU. She is the author of The Politics of Size: Representation in the United States, 1776-1850 (Cornell University Press, 1987), A Woman’s Dilemma: Mercy Otis Warren and the American Revolution (Harlan Davidson, 1995; 2nd. ed., WileyBlackwell, 2015), and Revolutionary Backlash: Women and Politics in the Early American Republic (University of Pennsylvania Press, Fall 2007), and is the editor of David Humphreys’ “Life of General Washington” with George’ Washington’s “Remarks” (University of George Press, 1991; ppb. 2006). She has received fellowships from the National Endowment for the Humanities (1997-1998, 2011-2012), the American Antiquarian Society, and the American Philosophical Society. Her scholarly articles have appeared in the Journal of American History, American Quarterly, the Journal of the Early Republic, and the William & Mary Quarterly, and in numerous edited collections of essays. I

== Distinctions ==
In 1992, Zagarri received the Outstanding Article Prize, awarded by the Southeastern Eighteenth-Century Studies Association, for “Morals, Manners, and the Republican Mother.” In Spring 1993, the Fulbright Commission appointed her to the Thomas Jefferson Chair in American Studies at the University of Amsterdam in the Netherlands. She has served on the editorial boards of American Quarterly, The Journal of the Early Republic, The William & Mary Quarterly, and the University of Virginia Press and was a member of the Council of the Omohundro Institute of Early American History and Culture. She has appeared as an on-camera historian on CSPAN’s Book TV, CSPAN's "Morning Journal," PBS’s “George Washington: The Man who Wouldn’t Be King,” and the Fairfax Television Network’s “The Real Martha Washington.” In 2009 she was elected President of the Society for Historians of the Early American Republic (SHEAR). In 2011, she received the Scholarship Award from GMU's College of Humanities and Social Sciences.

She was appointed a Distinguished Lecturer by the Organization of American Historians. She was appointed Distinguished University Professor in 2013.

== Bibliography ==
Books:

- Revolutionary Backlash: Women and Politics in the Early American Republic Philadelphia University of Pennsylvania Press, 2011, ISBN 9780812205558 OCLC 956784304
- A Woman's Dilemma: Mercy Otis Warren and the American Revolution John Wiley & Sons Inc., 2015, ISBN 9781118981139 OCLC 946550091
- David Humpheys' Life of General Washington, with Washington's 'Remarks,' University of Georgia Press, 1993.
- The Politics of Size: Representation in the United States, 1776 1850 , Ithaca, N.Y.: Cornell University Press, 2010, ISBN 9780801476396 OCLC 809373392
- Edmund S Morgan; Rosemarie Zagarri; Joseph J Ellis The Birth of the Republic, 1763-89 Chicago: University of Chicago Press, 2013. ISBN 0226923436, OCLC 958542693
- Life of General Washington
