= Books in the United States =

As of 2018, several firms in the United States rank among the world's biggest publishers of books in terms of revenue: Cengage Learning, HarperCollins, Houghton Mifflin Harcourt, McGraw Hill Education, Scholastic, Simon & Schuster, and Wiley. (Note: Of these, several also topped the list in 2016 and 2017.)

== History ==
In 1640, in Cambridge, Massachusetts, Stephen Daye produced the first book printed in British North America, the Bay Psalm Book. New England became the first early hub. Philadelphia also became significant, with William Bradford setting up the first paper mill and Benjamin Franklin opening his own press.

By the mid-19th century, New York City became the industry's center, marked by the rise of large publishing houses like Harper, Wiley, Putnam, and Scribner, who benefited from copyright laws and new distribution methods. Initially, they heavily relied on pirated British works until international copyright laws were established in 1891. The mid-19th century also saw innovations like paperback "dime novels" making literature more accessible. The American Library Association formed in 1876, and the Bibliographical Society of America in 1904.

The post-World War I era was a boom for American publishing with new writers and publishers like Simon & Schuster and Random House emerging. The Great Depression caused a setback, but the industry recovered post-war. Since the 1960s, there's been a trend of mergers and consolidation, accelerating with the rise of online retailers and ebooks, though New York City remains a major global publishing center, home to the "Big Five" publishers (including HarperCollins, Penguin Random House, and Simon & Schuster) and major educational publishers like Macmillan Learning, McGraw-Hill, Scholastic, Wiley, and numerous independent publishers. Starting with Cornell University Press in 1869 and Johns Hopkins University Press in 1878, many universities set up publishing houses to publish scholarly books and journals of this sort produced by their faculty and graduate students. In the 21st century, however, financial pressures. have been reducing their output.

== Types of Books and Publishing in the United States ==
There are five primary publishers that dominate the book industry known as the "Big Five." These five include Penguin Random House, Hachette Book Group, HarperCollins, Macmillian Publishers, and Simon and Schuster.

While historically publishing meant making information available to the public in physical form, it has now come to also include electronic materials.

The "Big Five" are examples of trade publishers, who focus on publishing books for the general public. Trade publishers are different from academic publishers, as they focus more on fiction, non-fiction, and biographies.

Educational publishing is separate from trade publishing, as it focuses on literature for public education. By the early 2000's, many independent publishers were bought out and merged into four primary publishing companies. These include Pearson, McGraw Hill, Reed Elsevier, and Houghton Mifflin.

Academic publishing is the third main sector of publishing in the United States. Many of these publishers are directly affiliated with universities, and four primary vendors act as intermediaries between university presses and academic libraries when distributing e-books. These include EBSCO, ProQuest, JSTOR, and Project Muse.

== Libraries and Book Access ==
Book access in the United States is not just limited to purchasing books, but is made more accessible through the public library system. In the last decade, libraries have made more efforts to increase equity, and in doing so, they are making their institutions more accessible to all. Some of the core values to be upheld by libraries include equal access to all information, intellectual freedom, and the commitment to the preservation and strengthening of information.

There are about 9,000 public libraries in the United States. These libraries provide their communities with popular fiction, non-fiction, magazines, audio and video recordings, e-books, databases, and more.

Academic libraries serve the student, faculty, staff, alumni, and community members at colleges and universities across the United States. These institutions typically provide textbooks, e-books, databases, research materials, and rare books to their users.

There are approximately 116,240 school libraries in the United States, which are located in public, private, and charter schools. These libraries serve the educational needs of students and provide them with fiction, non-fiction, biographies, e-books, databases, and more.

Special libraries are libraries that serve their parent institution. These include museums, government, law firms, hospitals, and more. Their collections are typically curated in support of their institution's mission and goals and aim to serve institutional needs.

== Types ==
- American cookbooks
- Astronomy books

== Bookselling ==
Popular books in the 19th century included Sheldon's In His Steps (1896). 20th century bestsellers included Mitchell's Gone with the Wind (1936), Carnegie's How to Win Friends and Influence People (1937), Spock's Common Sense Book of Baby and Child Care (1946), Harris' I'm OK – You're OK (1969), Woodward and Bernstein's All the President's Men (1974). Recent bestsellers have included Warren's Purpose-Driven Life (2002) and Brown's Da Vinci Code (2003).

The influential "New York Times Best Seller list" first appeared in 1931. The online bookseller Amazon.com began business in July 1995, based in the state of Washington.

== Fairs ==
- BookExpo America, trade fair
- New York Antiquarian Book Fair (est. 1960)

== Clubs ==
- Book of the Month Club, subscription business, est. 1926
- Oprah's Book Club, est. 1996
- Fellowship of American Bibliophilic Societies, est. 1993. Members include:
  - Book Club of California, San Francisco, California; est. 1912
  - The Caxton Club, Chicago, Illinois; est. 1895
  - Florida Bibliophile Society, Bayonet Point, Florida; est. 1983
  - The Grolier Club, New York, New York; est. 1884
  - The Ticknor Society, Boston, Massachusetts; est. 2002

== Collections ==
Some notable collections of books of the United States include:

- American Antiquarian Society (est. 1812), Worcester, Massachusetts
- Library of Congress (est. 1800), Washington DC

== Digitization ==
The nonprofit Internet Archive began scanning books in 2004, in the same year that Google Inc. launched Google Book Search. In 2005, Google began scanning pages of volumes in several large research libraries in the US, as part of its new Google Books Library Project. The Open Content Alliance formed in 2005.

== Images ==
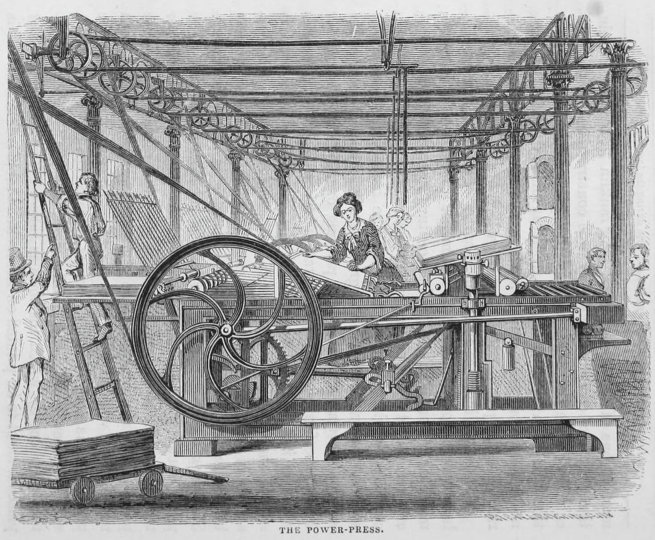
Harper & Brothers printing press, New York City, 1850s

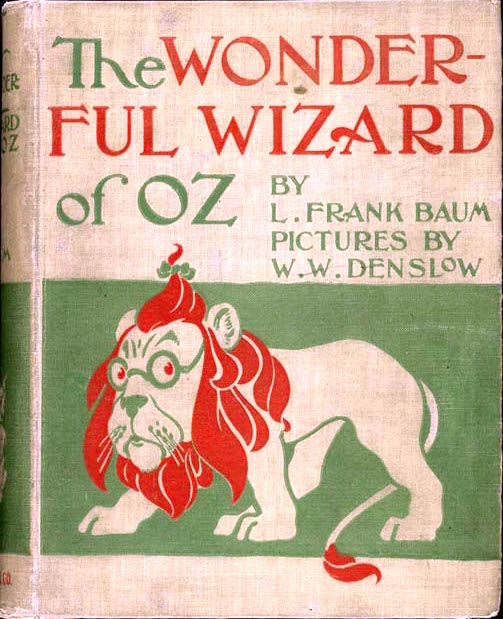
Cover of The Wonderful Wizard of Oz children's book, 1900; published by George M. Hill Company, Chicago

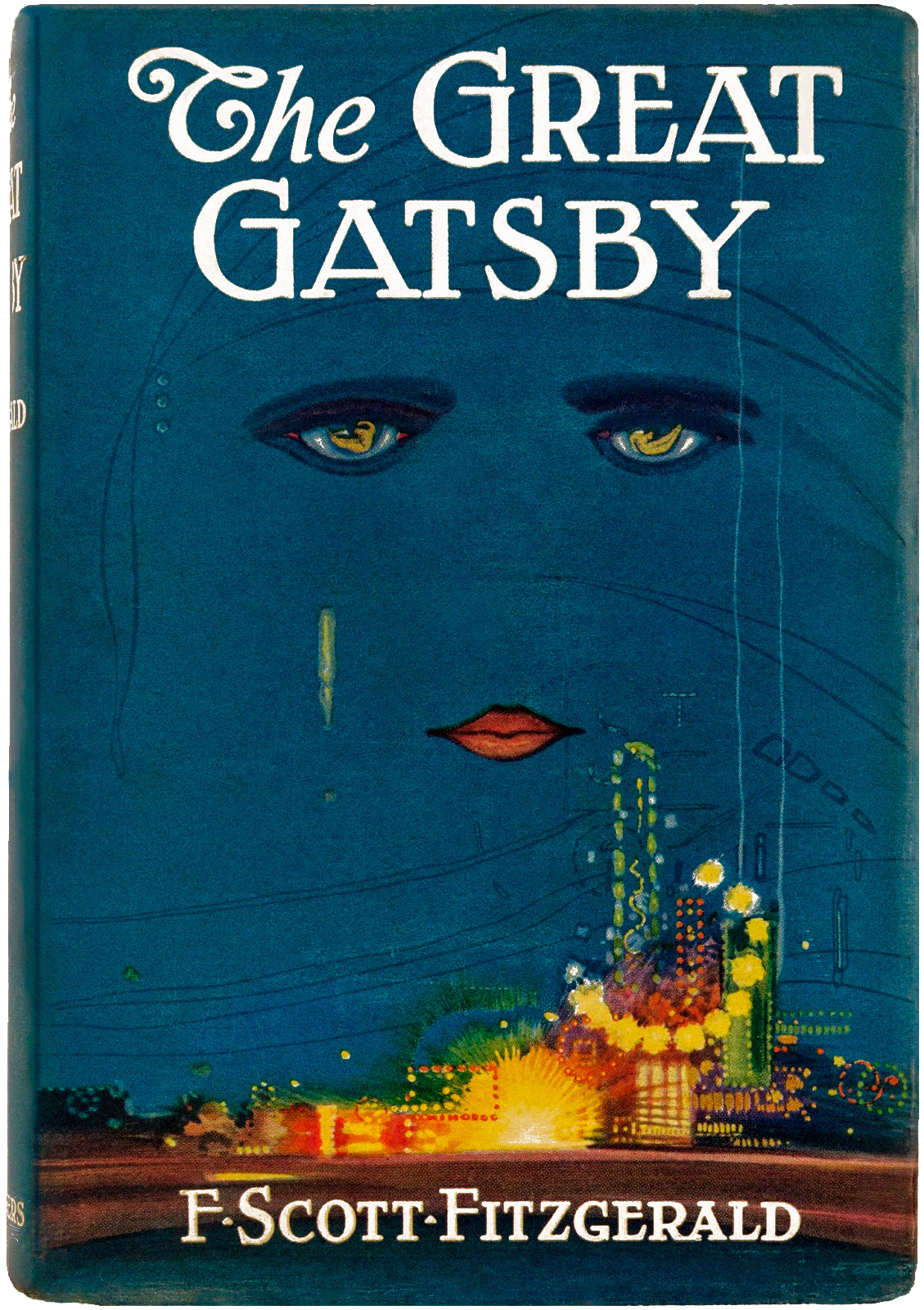
Dust jacket of The Great Gatsby, 1925; published by Charles Scribner's Sons, New York

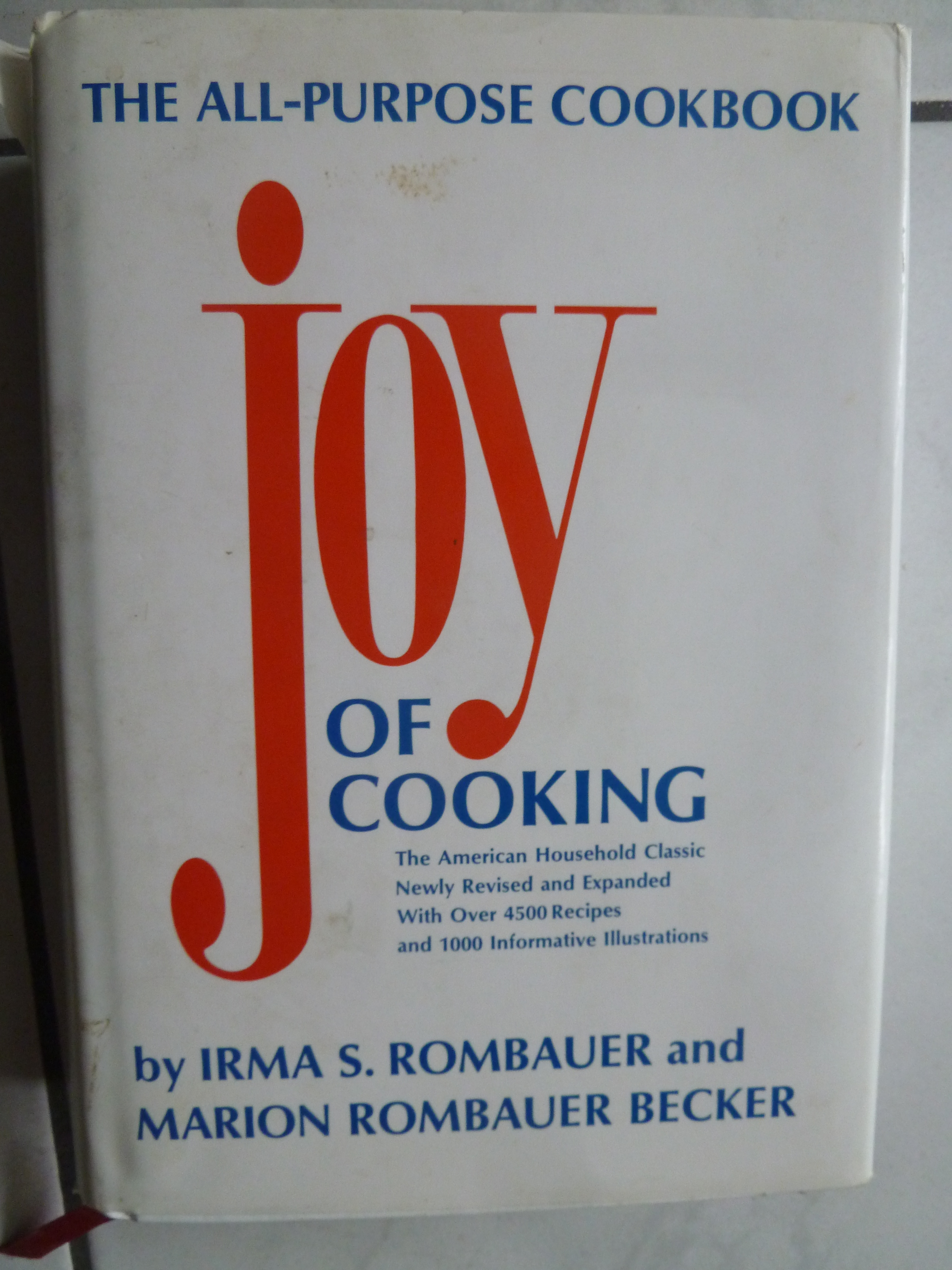
Bestseller Joy of Cooking cookbook, 1975 edition, first published in 1931

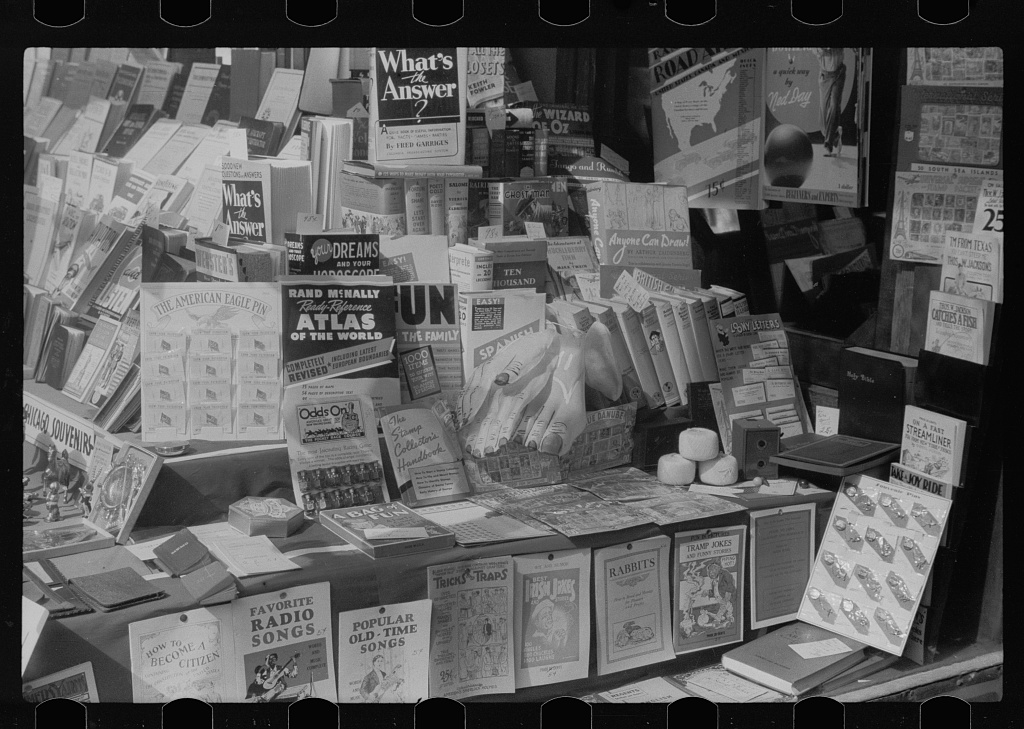
Bookshop, Chicago, 1940

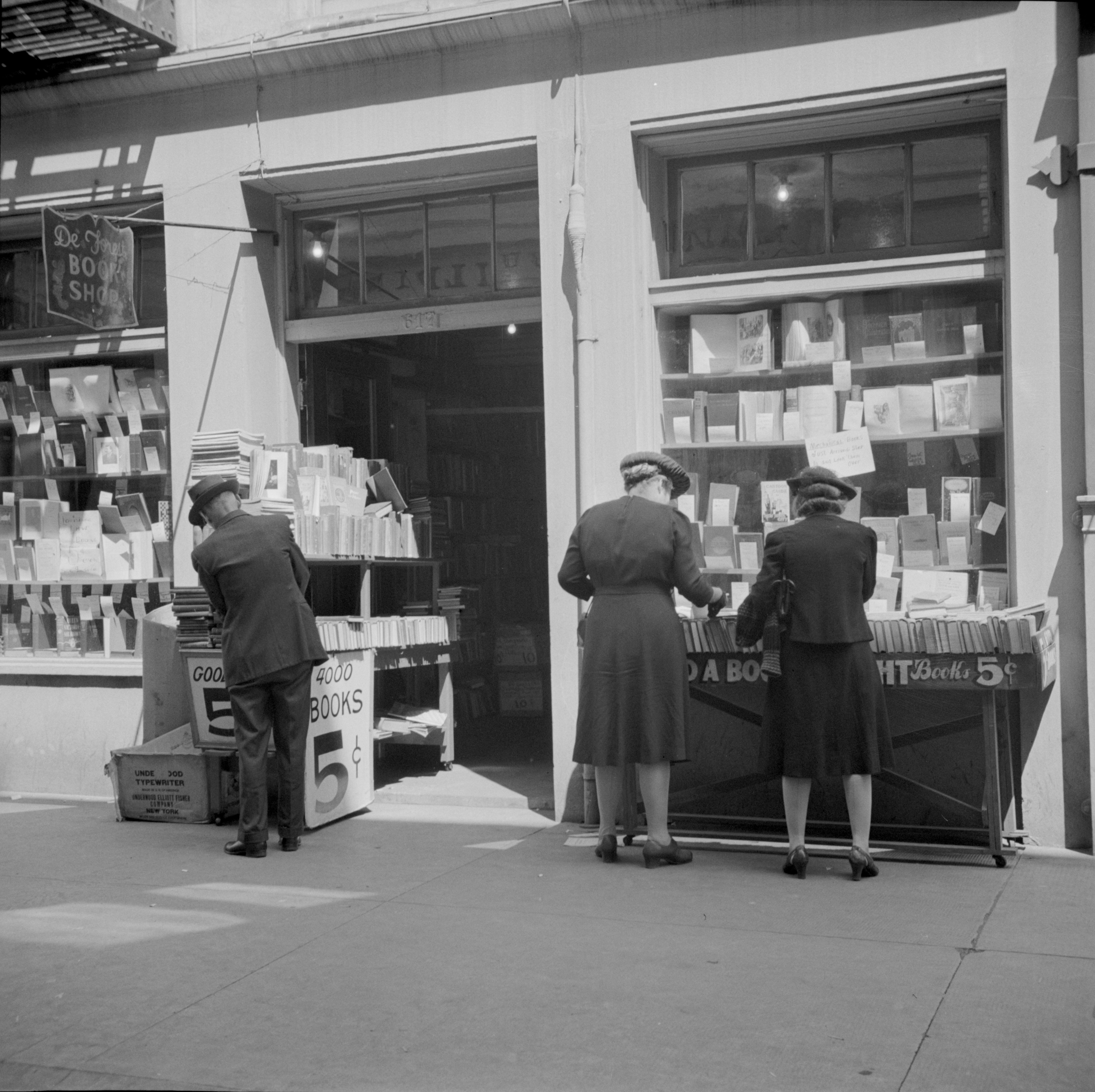
De Forest Book Shop, New Orleans, 1943

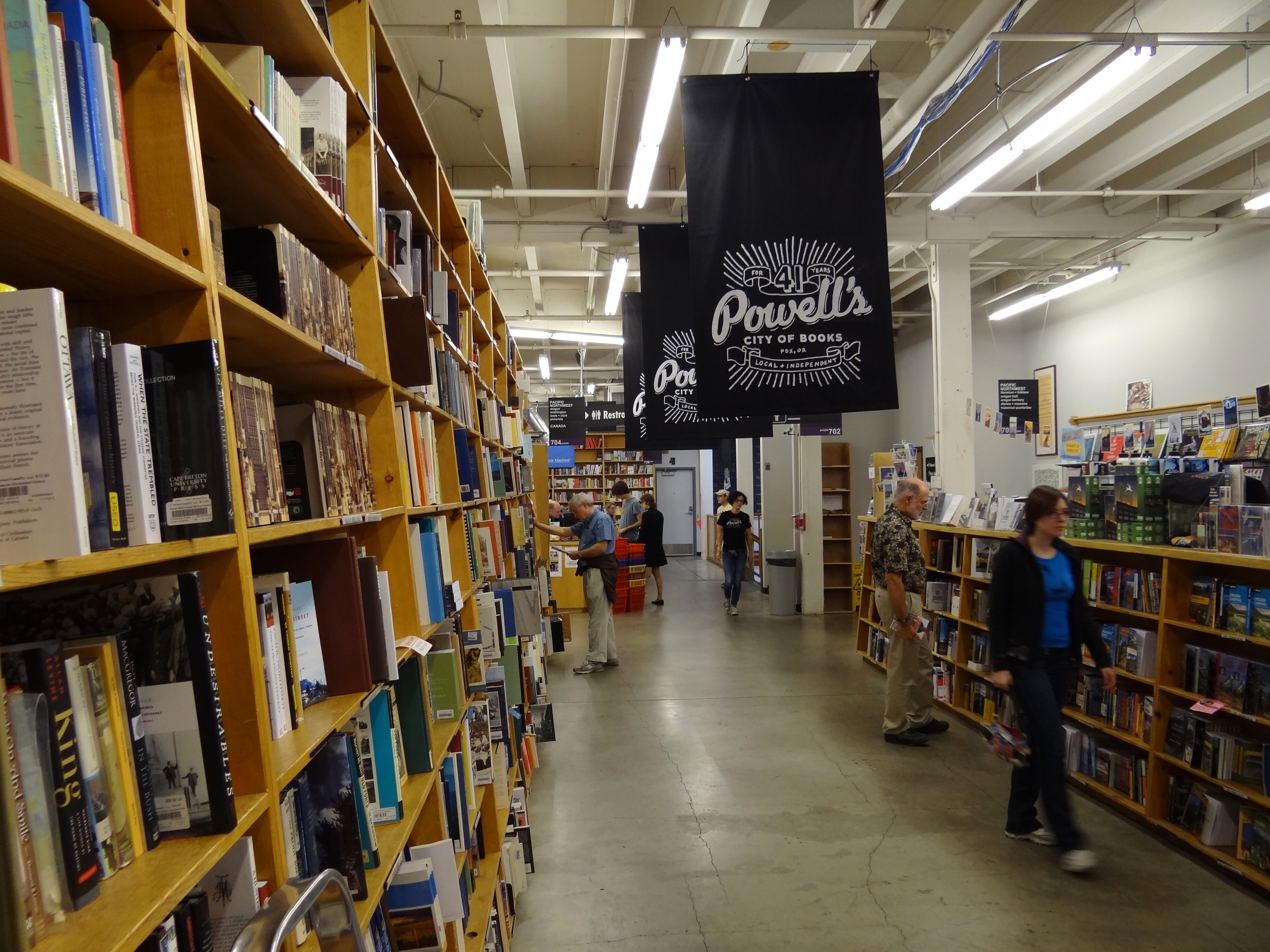
Powell's bookshop est. 1971, Portland, Oregon (photo 2012)

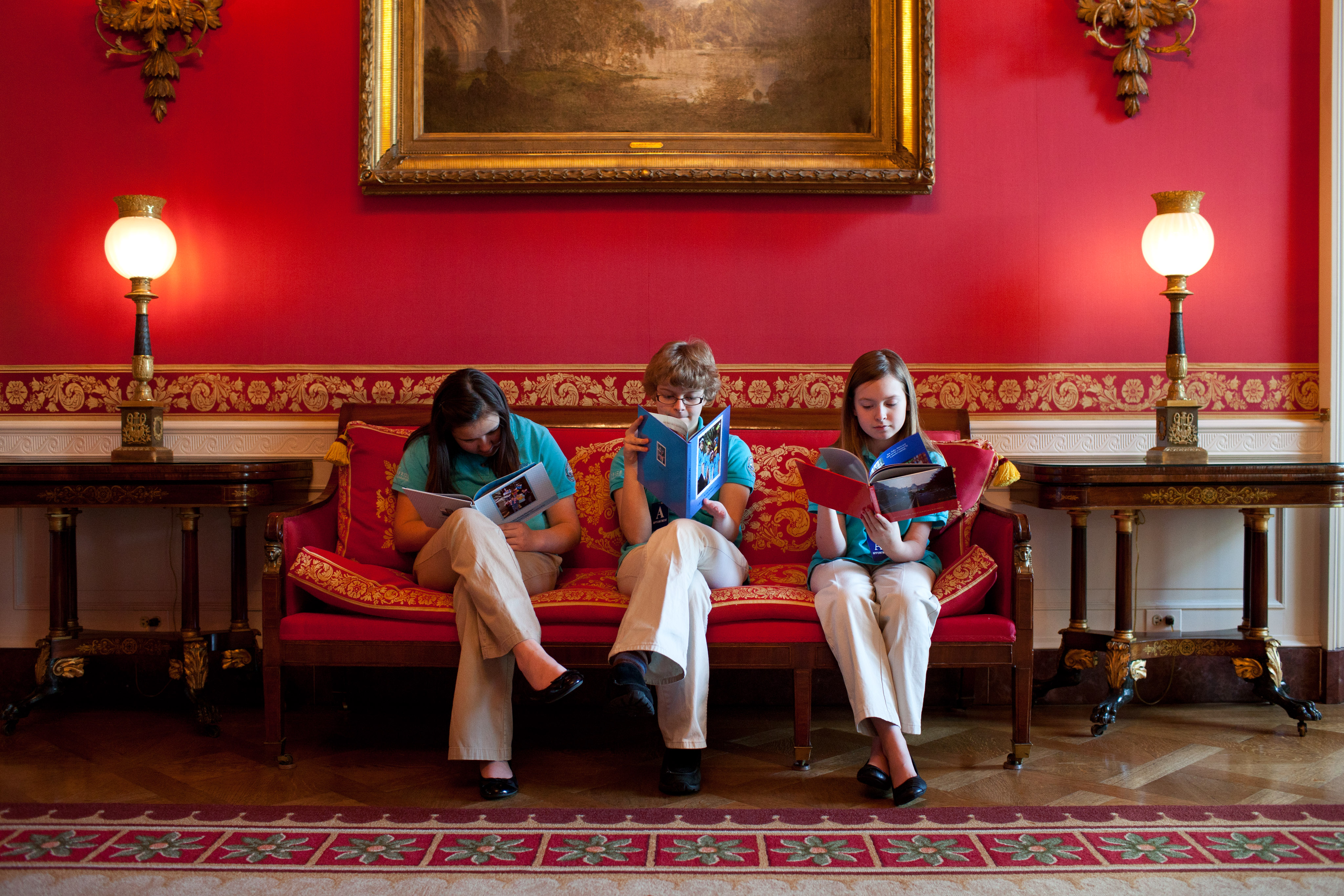
Children reading in the White House, 2012

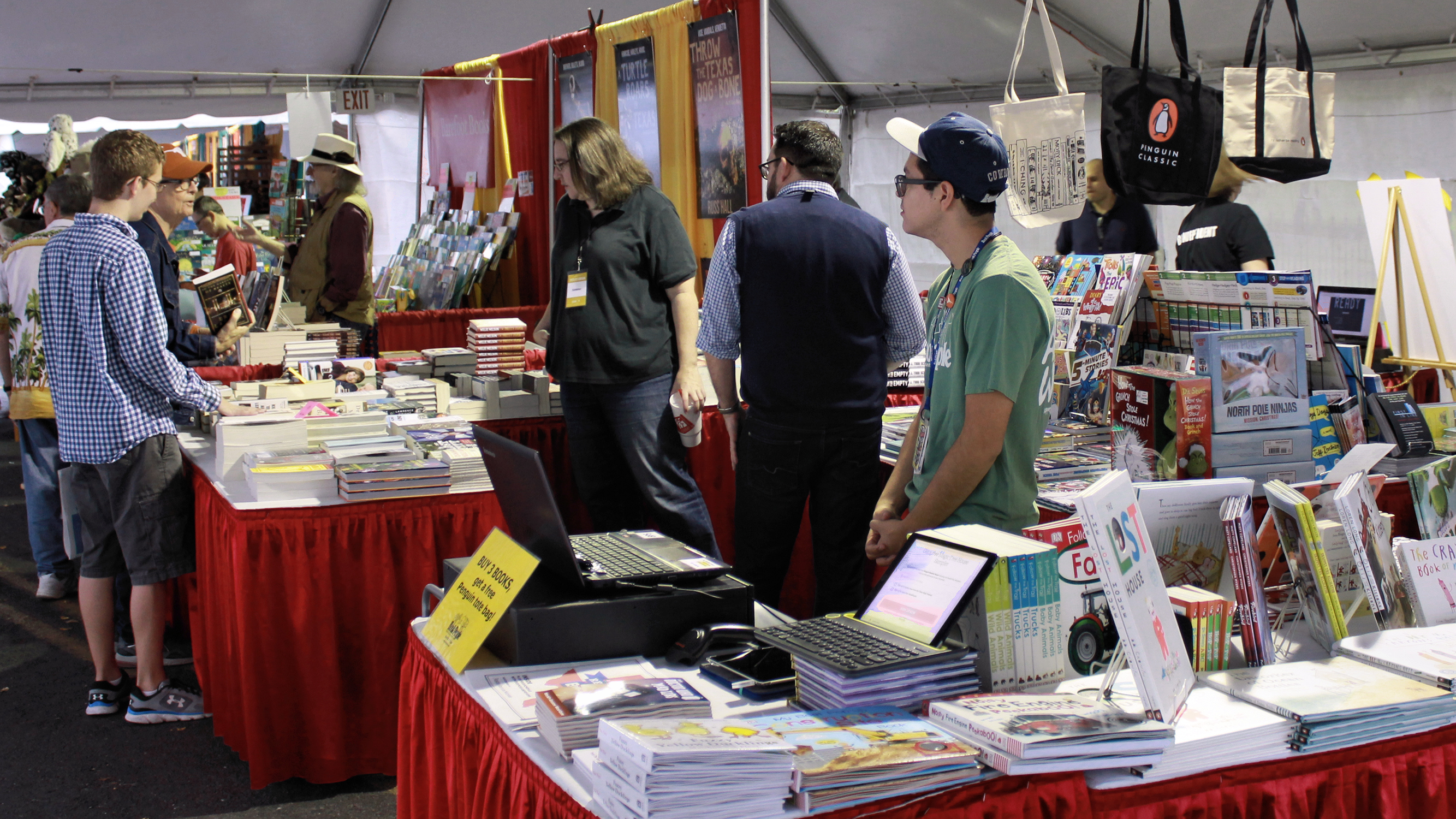
Texas Book Festival est. 1996, Austin, Texas (photo 2016)

== Bibliography ==
=== Published in 19th century ===
- Joseph Sabin; Wilberforce Eames; R. W. G. Vail, eds. (1868–1936). Bibliotheca Americana: a Dictionary of Books relating to America, from its Discovery to the Present Time. New York. OCLC 13972268.
- "Publishers Weekly", Children's Starred Reviews Annual, ISSN 0000-0019 1872-
- G.W. Porter; G.K. Fortescue, eds. (1889). "Bibliographies of Countries: United States of America". List of Bibliographical Works in the Reading Room of the British Museum (2nd ed.). London. OCLC 3816244 – via Internet Archive.
- "The New York Times Book Review", The New York Times Book Review: The Section 7, ISSN 0028-7806 1896-

=== Published in 20th century ===
- Charles Evans (1903–1959), American Bibliography
- "Booklist", Booklist / A Guide to Current Books, American Library Association, ISSN 0006-7385 1905-. (Book reviews)
- Alice Bertha Kroeger; Isadore Gilbert Mudge (1917). "Bibliography: National and Trade: American". Guide to the Study and Use of Reference Books (3rd ed.). American Library Association.
- Henry Walcott Boynton (1932). Annals of American Bookselling, 1638–1850. J. Wiley & Sons – via HathiTrust.
- Lawrence C. Wroth (1938), The Colonial Printer (2nd ed.), Portland, Maine: Southworth-Anthoensen Press – via Internet Archive
- Bureau of the Census, Industry Division (1947), Book Publishing Industry in the United States: 1945, Facts for Industry, OCLC 67889130
- Hellmut Lehmann-Haupt [in German] (1951). The book in America: a history of the making and selling of books in the United States (2nd ed.). Bowker.
- Cecil J. McHale (1957), Guide to General Book Publishers in the United States (4th ed.), Ann Arbor, MI
- "New York Review of Books", The New York Review of Books 2022, ISSN 0028-7504 1963-
- Charles A. Madison (1966). Book Publishing in America. McGraw-Hill. OCLC 729685674.
- Gerald Danzer, "America's Roots in the Past: Historical Publication in America to 1860" (PhD dissertation, Northwestern University; ProQuest Dissertations & Theses, 1967. 6803170).
- John Tebbel [in German] (1972–1981). History of Book Publishing in the United States. Bowker. ISBN 0-8352-0489-8.
- Allen Kent; et al., eds. (1978). "Printers and Printing: the United States". Encyclopedia of Library and Information Science. Vol. 23. Marcel Dekker. ISBN 978-0-8247-2023-0.
- U.S. Book Publishing Yearbook and Directory, ISSN 0193-6417 1979-
- Michael Hackenberg, ed. (1987), Getting the Books Out: Papers of the Chicago Conference on the Book in 19th-century America, Washington DC: Center for the Book, ISBN 978-0-8444-0569-8. Chapters include:
  - "Institutional Book Collecting in the Old Northwest, 1876-1900" by Terry Belanger
  - "Copyright and Books in Nineteenth-century America" by Alice D. Schreyer
  - "Dissemination of Popular Books in the Midwest and Far West during the Nineteenth-century" by Madeleine B. Stern
  - "Getting the Books Out: trade sales, parcel sales, and book fairs in the nineteenth-century United States" by Michael Winship
- Margaret A. Blanchard, ed. (2013) [1998]. History of the Mass Media in the United States: An Encyclopedia. Routledge. ISBN 978-1-135-91749-4. (Includes several articles about books)
- André Schiffrin (2000). The Business of Books: How International Conglomerates Took Over Publishing and Changed the Way We Read. Verso. ISBN 978-1-85984-763-3.
- History of the Book in America, University of North Carolina Press, 2000–2010

=== Published in 21st century ===
- Paul S. Boyer, ed. (2001). "Printing and Publishing". Oxford Companion to United States History. Oxford University Press. p. 620. ISBN 978-0-19-508209-8.
- "Books That Shaped America". Exhibitions. Washington DC: Library of Congress. 2012.
- Scott E. Casper; Joan Shelley Rubin (2013). "America". In Michael F. Suarez; H. R. Woudhuysen (eds.). The Book: A Global History. Oxford University Press. pp. 682+. ISBN 978-0-19-967941-6.
- "How Independent Bookstores Have Thrived in Spite of Amazon.com", Working Knowledge, Harvard Business School, 20 November 2017, OCLC 55998168
- "Meet the YouTube Stars Turning Viewers Into Readers", New York Times, July 31, 2018. (Discusses BookTube and Booksplosion book club)

== See also ==
- Copyright law of the United States
- African-American book publishers in the United States, 1960–80
- American literature
- Category:American writers
- Literacy in the United States
  - Reading education in the United States
- Book censorship in the United States
  - List of most commonly challenged books in the United States
- One City One Book, initiated in Seattle in 1998 ("If All of Seattle Read the Same Book")
- Mass media in the United States and Category:History of mass media in the United States
