= Reading the Romance =

1984 book by Janice Radway

Reading the Romance is a book by Janice Radway that analyzes the Romance novel genre using reader-response criticism, first published in 1984 and reprinted in 1991. The 1984 edition of the book is composed of an introduction, six chapters, and a conclusion, structured partly around Radway's investigation of romance readers in Smithton (a pseudonym) and partly around Radway's own criticism. Radway herself expresses preference for reader-response criticism throughout the course of the book, as opposed to the popular new criticism during the 1980s.

The book continues to sell at much the same rate it did in its first year of publication, having been adopted as a critical text in the fields of anthropology, sociology, history, and library studies, as well as in literary criticism.

== The publishing industry and Smithton readers ==
Radway begins Reading the Romance with a look at the publishing industry for romance novels. She insists that “[Romance novels] are, rather, the end products of a much-mediated, highly complex, material and social process that involves writers, literary agents, publishing officials, and editors, as well as hundreds of other people who participate in the manufacture, distribution, and selling of books,” It is also asserted that the reader plays a significant part in the publishing industry, as romance novels were often purchased by mail order in the 1980s, the reader could order subscriptions to certain publishing houses in advance, as they could come to expect the quality of the authors whose titles were included in the subscription.

Radway's next sections of Reading the Romance are her reports from her various interviews of Smithton readers. Multiple polls are featured throughout this section, displaying favorite archetypes of heroines and heroes, as well as what comprises a “good” and “bad” romance novel. Yet Radway stresses the most important component to a “good” title to be the word of mouth recommendation, as the women interviewed trusted a bookstore owner, Dot's, judgment pertaining to titles not only because it correlated with theirs, but because of her vast knowledge of different novels.

Throughout this section, the conventions of romance novels are discussed. Radway emphasizes the idea of a happy, satisfying ending as well as the struggle of the heroine, who often, if not always, lives in a state of weakness in a patriarchal society. While this might seem demeaning to women, Radway explains that “By picturing the heroine in relative positions of weakness, romances are not necessarily endorsing her situation, but examining an all-too-common state of affairs in order to display possible strategies for coping with it,” The love story of a romance novel does not constitute the entirety of the novel. Instead the heroine's journey from losing her social identity to gaining her identity through her ability to nurture the hero is the real focus of the successful romance novel.

== Language and Narrative Discourse ==
Radway also analyzes the romance genre, yet instead of listing her own preferences or specific works, she examines the genre by looking at the language of the romance novel and how that language affects the readers. The style, Radway points out, is relatively simplistic. She describes it as “The contemporary romance’s prose is dominated by cliché, simple vocabulary, standard syntax, and the most common techniques associated with the nineteenth-century realist novel.” While these methods allow romance novels to be easily read, it is not just a sacrifice of artistic ability. The successful, fulfilling romance novel exists when the author herself has provided meaning for her story through the words she has written. Radway explains this further with this excerpt:

Reading is not a self-conscious, productive process in which they collaborate with the author, but an act of discovery during which they glean from her information about people, places, and events not themselves in the book. The women assume that the information about these events was placed in the book by the author when she selected certain words in favor of others. Because they believe words are themselves already meaningful before they read, Dot and her friends accept without question the accuracy of all statements about a character’s personality or the implications of an event.

— Janice Radway, Reading the Romance

This sort of interpretation keeps romance novel readers from having to guess the interpretation of a text. They link signifiers with signifieds not by historical significance and that specific word choice, but to meanings that resonate personally with them. Radway elaborates on this idea by stating “[Romance novel readers] rely on standard cultural codes correlating signifiers and signifieds that they accept as definitive. It has simply never occurred to them that those codes might be historically or culturally relative.” This type of criticism, unlike the New Critics, is focused solely on readers’ interpretation and the ability of the author to write in such a way that their words will resonate with each one personally. Therefore, the use of clichés, uncomplicated syntax, and signifiers which utilize familiar cultural elements assists the Romance genre.

Yet while there seems to be a lack of quality, this structure is not comprised due to laziness. The romance genre is precisely that: a genre, and one that serves not as an artistic tool but one that, for a little while, assures its readers of their own self-worth and ability to affect a patriarchic world, so by the end of the novel the female readers, often mothers, feel invigorated and ready to take on the day-to-day tasks of managing the home and family. However, Radway asserts that it is the individual woman's choice to read romance novels, and that this selection not only fabricates a predictable, happy ending but depicts a heroine who discovers her own individuality through her ability to care for others, as opposed to unique personal qualities.

== Awards ==
- International Communication Association Fellows Book Award (2012)
