= Sanford Berman =

American librarian (born 1933)

- Born: October 6, 1933 (age 93); Chicago, Illinois, U.S.
- Education: University of California, Los Angeles; The Catholic University of America
- Occupation: Librarian

Sanford Berman (born October 6, 1933) is a librarian (specifically, a cataloger). He is known for radicalism, promoting alternative viewpoints in librarianship, and acting as a proactive information conduit to other librarians around the world. His vehicles of influence include public speaking, voluminous correspondence, and unsolicited "care packages" delivered via the U.S. Postal Service. Will Manley, columnist for the American Library Association (ALA) publication, American Libraries, has praised Berman: "He makes you proud to be a librarian."

== Biography ==
Berman was born in Chicago, Illinois. He attended University of California at Los Angeles, where he earned a BA in Political Science with minors in Sociology, Anthropology, and English, and where he was elected a member of Phi Beta Kappa. After acquiring an MS in Library Science from The Catholic University of America in Washington, D.C., Berman began work as a librarian. He worked for the U.S. Army Special Services Libraries, West Germany (1962–1966), where he helped edit an underground press GI magazine titled, Yin/Yang; Schiller College, Kleiningersheim, West Germany (1966–1967); University of California at Los Angeles Research Library (1967–1968), where he rescued back runs of I. F. Stone's Weekly from the trash bin; University of Zambia Library, Lusaka, Zambia (1968–1970); Makerere Institute of Social Research, Makerere University Library, Kampala, Uganda (1971–1972); and Hennepin County Library, Minnesota (1973–1999).

== Library activism ==
=== Alternative subject headings ===
Berman has been a leading critic of biased headings in the Library of Congress Subject Headings. His 1971 publication, Prejudices and Antipathies: A Tract on the LC Subject Heads Concerning People, sparked a movement to correct biased subject headings. Berman listed 225 headings with proposed alterations, additions, or deletions and cross-references to "more accurately reflect the language used in addressing these topics, to rectify errors of bias, and to better guide librarians and readers to material of interest." Berman stated, "The fact that a number of meanings may be assigned to a given word explains why messages are subject to misinterpretation and why our communication is open to misunderstandings." He asserted that messages and therefore subject headings must convey an idea in a fashion free from prejudice. Berman realized the continued use of biased subject headings would significantly limit the ability of a patron to access materials in the collection. Berman also thought the use of language in headings should be clear and concise, and should reflect the current use of everyday people rather than only scientific or technical terms. Overall, the use of common language in subject headings would enable prompt retrieval of materials by the end user.

Berman also openly criticized centrally performed cataloging and standard cataloging tools that supported bias in subject headings. He stated, "[O]ur national cataloging products and services can't be completely trusted and should not be accepted automatically nor uncritically by anyone who genuinely believes that cataloging should make material more rather than less accessible and retrievable." Cataloging that was outrightly erroneous or inadequate rendered material inaccessible even though it was in the collection. Berman thought poor cataloging was a serious form of censorship. Libraries were supposed to oppose censorship and provide the widest possible spectrum of cultural, social, economic, political, religious, and sexual information. With this in mind, Berman indicated local libraries should make a conscious effort to describe accurately all materials in the catalog for a patron. A considerable amount of conscious effort meant including "public notes" to clarify unfamiliar concepts for patrons. The public notes would let a patron know whether an item would suit the information needs. Furthermore, Berman opposed the practice of not cataloging all important aspects of works. Patrons cannot access materials when they have not been fully catalogued.

The spark of Berman's cataloging revolution was the inclusion in Library of Congress Subject Headings (LCSH) of the term kaffir, which he came across while working in Zambia, where the term is considered a racial slur. This motivated him to systematically address subject heading bias in his work at Hennepin County Library and in writing Prejudices and Antipathies: a Tract on the LC Subject Heads Concerning People. The work, published in two editions, examines racism, sexism, a Christian-centric worldview, and other biases inherent in the LCSH. Berman also is known for his role in encouraging the Library of Congress to drop such archaic headings as "Water Closet" in favor of contemporary terminology.

In 1984, Berman recommended a series of subject heading changes for Judaica materials to remove Christian-centric biases and reflect Jewish language, experience, and viewpoint. Additionally, he recommended instituting subject headings for “Israeli-Occupied Territories,” “Palestinian State” and “West Bank (Jordan River)--Israeli Settlements,” and contested the established “Jewish-Arab Relations” heading, arguing that “Israeli-Arab Relations” was more accurate.

During the last six months of 2005, working with the assistance of Steve Fesenmaier, Berman convinced the Library of Congress to create many new subject headings, including "American Dream," "Plutocracy," "West Virginia Mine Wars, 1897-1921," "The Battle of Blair Mountain, 1921," and several others.

With librarian James P. Danky, Berman was the editor of Alternative Library Literature, (1982–2001) a biennial compilation of alternative essays on librarianship from a wide variety of other sources. Berman's other titles include The Joy of Cataloging and Worth Noting. He is the original radical librarian; his followers refer to themselves as "Sandynistas" or guerrilla cataloguers. He was a founding member of a group known as the "Revolting Librarians," which published a manifesto about library-related issues.

=== American Library Association ===
Berman co-authored the 1990 ALA Policy on Library Services to Poor People, and founded the American Library Association's Hunger, Homelessness, and Poverty Task Force, a division of the Social Responsibilities Round Table (SRRT). In 1989 he was honored with the American Library Association Equality Award.

In June 2005, he gave the Jean E. Coleman Library Outreach Lecture at the annual ALA conference, dedicated to the founder of OLOS.

Also in the early 1990s, Berman participated in the SRRT Action Council in advocating ALA to address Censorship in Israel with a Task Force on Israeli Censorship and Palestinian Libraries. He would later attempt to move organizing outside of ALA following backlash and conflicts with taskforce chair David Williams.

With other Minnesota librarians, as well as those nationally and internationally, Berman is known for promoting activist librarianship in which social justice is part and parcel of professional work. Thanks to this advocacy, the American Library Association's official policy recognizes the key role of librarians in addressing social ills.

Berman was awarded American Library Association Honorary Membership in 2004.

He was awarded the ALA Social Responsibilities Round Table "Herb Biblo Outstanding Leadership Award for Social Justice & Equality" in 2025.

=== Post-retirement ===
Having retired in 1999, Berman continues to solicit the Library of Congress for additions and modifications to the LCSH system. Since 2005, he has led an effort to honor American labor leaders Mary Harris "Mother" Jones and Eugene Debs with commemorative postage stamps. In 2013, McFarland & Company published a collection of his "Unabashed Librarian" columns as a book called Not in My Library. In December 2019, the Edina Human Rights and Relations Commission recognized Berman's commitment to social justice with the Tom Oye Award.

The Sanford Berman papers are part of the American Library Association (ALA) Archives held by the University of Illinois Library. The data files of the Hennepin County Library catalog are included in this collection.

== Awards ==
- California State Seal of Merit, 1950
- Minnesota Librarian of the Year, 1977
- ALA's Margaret Mann Citation, 1981
- Honeywell Project Anniversary Award for Peace and Justice, 1988
- ALA's Equality Award, 1989
- Multicultural Review's Carey McWilliams Award, 1994, for Prejudices and Antipathies
- Robert B. Downs Intellectual Freedom Award, 1996
- Tom Oye Award, 2019
- ALA's Herb Biblo Outstanding Leadership Award for Social Justice & Equality, 2025
