= Through a Forest of Chancellors =

Through a Forest of Chancellors: Fugitive Histories in Liu Yuan’s Lingyan ge, an Illustrated Book from Seventeenth-Century Suzhou is a 2010 nonfiction book by Anne Burkus-Chasson, published by Harvard University Asia Center.

The work is about Liu Yuan jinghui Lingyan ge (劉源敬繪凌煙閣), a.k.a. Lingyan ge, by Liu Yuan (劉源), an illustrated book first published circa 1669 in Suzhou.

== Contents ==
The work includes the actual book Liu Yuan jinghui Lingyan ge, in black and white and about 65% of the original size, as well as Burkus-Chasson's analysis; the former is in the appendix, and the latter has more pages versus the former.

Chapters 1 through 3, which make up "The Composition of the Book" (Part 1), illustrate the parts of the book. The cover through table of contents are discussed in chapter 1. The images of government officials in the Tang dynasty are in Chapter 2. 24 such images are discussed. The setup of the book that made readers turn pages is discussed in Chapter 3.

"The Publication of the Book," the second part, includes Chapters 4 and 5. Chapter 4 explains the life of Liu Yuan and Tong Pengnian, who supported Liu Yuan, as well as historical details. The appendix is discussed in Chapter 5, "Vexations of Passage."

== See also ==
- Printing and Book Culture in Late Imperial China, which has an essay by Burkus-Chasson about this subject
