= Russell Lynes =

American art historian (1910–1991)

- Born: December 2, 1910; Great Barrington, Massachusetts
- Died: September 14, 1991 (aged 80); New York City
- Education: Yale University
- Occupations: Art historian, photographer, author, editor
- Spouse: Mildred Akin
- Children: 2
- Writing career
- Notable works: The Tastemakers, Snobs

Russell Lynes (Joseph Russell Lynes, Jr.; December 2, 1910 – September 14, 1991) was an American art historian, photographer, author and managing editor of Harper's Magazine.

== Early life ==
Born in Great Barrington, Massachusetts, Lynes was the younger son of Adelaide Sparkman and Joseph Russell Lynes. His older brother was George Platt Lynes (1907–1955), the photographer. In 1932, he graduated from Yale University.

== Career ==
Lynes started as a clerk at Harper & Brothers, the publishing house, from 1932 to 1936 and was director of publications at Vassar in 1936 and 1937. He then took a job at the Shipley School in Bryn Mawr, Pennsylvania, where he was assistant principal from 1937 to 1940, then principal until 1944. He then joined Harper's Magazine as an assistant editor and became managing editor in 1947, a position he would hold for the next twenty years. Lynes was interested in historic preservation, notably and influentially writing about the threat to Olana, the home of Frederic Church in upstate New York, in The Tastemakers and in the February 1965 issue of Harper's.

=== Bibliography ===
- Life in the Slow Lane (1991)
- The Lively Audience: A Social History of the Visual and Performing Arts inAmerica, 1890-1950. (1985)
- The Art Makers: An Informal History of Painting, Sculpture & Architecture in Nineteenth Century America (1983)
- More than meets the eye: The history and collections of Cooper-Hewitt Museum, the Smithsonian Institution's National Museum of Design (1981)
- Good Old Modern; an intimate portrait of the Museum of Modern Art (1973)
- The Art-Makers of Nineteenth Century America (1970)
- Confessions of a Dilettante (1966)
- The Domesticated Americans (1963)
- Cadwallader: A Diversion (1959)
- A Surfeit of Honey (1957)
- The Tastemakers (1954)
- Guests (1951)
- Snobs (1950)
- Highbrow, Lowbrow, Middlebrow (1949)

== Personal life ==
In 1934, he married Mildred Akin (died 1999), who was a Vassar graduate, the step-daughter of artist Henry Ives Cobb, Jr. (1883–1974) and a granddaughter of George W. Wickersham (1858–1936), U.S. Attorney General under William Howard Taft. Together, they had two children:

- George Platt Lynes II (died 2015), who married Jane Lynes.
- Elizabeth R. Lynes (1939–2015), who married Sidney Hollander in 1962. They divorced and in 1997, she married Carl Kaestle (born 1940).

He died on September 14, 1991, in New York City at Columbia-Presbyterian Medical Center.
