= The Power of Print in Modern China =

The Power of Print in Modern China: Intellectuals and Industrial Publishing from the End of Empire to Maoist State Socialism is a non-fiction book by Robert Culp, published by Columbia University Press in 2019.

The book covers the subject starting with the Qing dynasty, with the Republic of China getting the most coverage, and ending with the Cultural Revolution. Commercial Press, World Book Company, and Zhonghua Book Company are the three companies with the most prominent coverage. Fan Zhuang of the University of Macau stated that the book's chronology means it "captures the enormous changes in culture and society through the lenses of printing and publishing."

According to Zhuang, The Power of Print in Modern China has more of a focus on persons in the industry while Gutenberg in Shanghai focuses more on equipment and processes.

== Background ==
The author used diaries and memoirs as sourcing.

== Reception ==
Robert E. Hegel stated that the summaries were useful for readers tracking complex arguments, the notes were "extensive and helpful", and that the writing was done in a "clear, concise" way.

== See also ==
- Printing and Book Culture in Late Imperial China
