= James Danky =

American academic (born 1947)

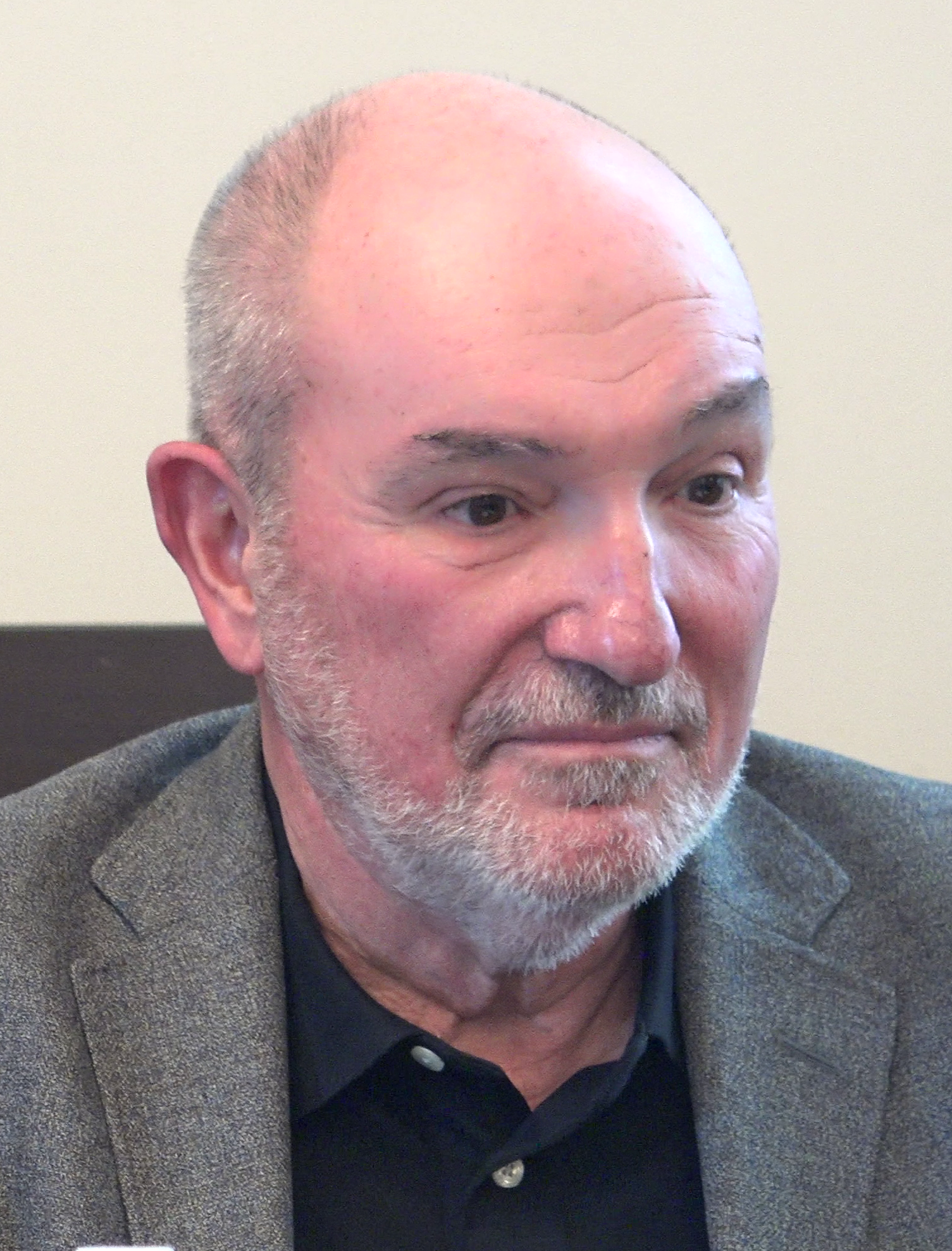
Danky at Columbia University in 2015

James Danky (born 1947) is an American historian, bibliographer, and culture critic. He is currently a faculty associate at the University of Wisconsin-Madison School of Journalism and Mass Communication. Danky advocated for collecting alternative and small-press publications during his tenure at the Wisconsin Historical Society.

== Biography ==
Danky received an AB in history and philosophy from Ripon College (1970) and a MA in Library Science at the University of Wisconsin (1973).

He served as the Newspapers and Periodicals Librarian for the Wisconsin Historical Society from 1976-2007. Danky is also a co-founder of the Center for the History of Print Culture in Modern America and served as its director from 1992-2006.

From 1999 to 2009 Danky taught for the School of Journalism with a focus on race and media. Danky edited the series "Print Culture History in Modern America" for the University of Wisconsin Press from 2002 to 2022.

Danky believed that “collecting contemporary alternative and small-press publications was key to providing an in-depth picture of current social, cultural, and political issues and debates.”

He is currently adjunct curator of comics at the Museum of Wisconsin Art which published his Wisconsin Funnies: Fifty Years of Comics.

== Honors and awards ==
James Danky

Danky is the recipient of the American Library Association’s Bowker/Ulrich’s Serials Librarianship award (1987) and the Isadore Gilbert Mudge-R.R. Bowker Award (2002). In 1991, Danky was a Fulbright Scholar at the British Library, where his research focused on the alternative press in Britain, especially Afro-British publications.

In 1998 Danky returned to London to teach American History at University College. He was named a Media Hero at the Institute for Alternative Journalism (1991), was elected a member of the American Antiquarian Society (1996), and was a fellow at the W. E. B. Du Bois Institute for African-American Research at Harvard from 1997-1998.

In 2007 friends and colleagues put on a two-day conference, "Alternative Print Culture: Social History and Libraries," the results of which were published in Library Trends, v.56, n.3; Winter, 2008. This conference celebrated Danky’s contributions and collections at the Wisconsin Historical Society.

Danky was honored with the Distinguished Service to Journalism History Award in 2019.

== Selected bibliography ==
- Danky, James P., "Studies on the Right with Chip Berlet," Exposing the Right and Fighting for Democracy, Celebrating Chip Berlet as a Journalist and Scholar, edited by Pam Chamberlain, Matthew N. Lyons, Abby Scher, and Spencer Sunshine. London and New York, Routledge 2022.
- Danky, James P. and Denis Kitchen, Wisconsin Funnies: Fifty Years of Comics. West Bend, Museum of Wisconsin Art, 2020.
- Danky, James P. and Denis Kitchen. Underground Classics: The Transformation of Comics into Comix. New York: Abrams; Madison, WI: Chazen Museum of Art, 2009. ISBN 0-8109-0598-1
- Danky, James P. “The Oppositional Press.” In A History of the Book in America, Volume 5, edited by Michael Schudson, David Paul Nord, and Joan Shelly Rubin. Cambridge: Cambridge University Press, 2009. ISBN 0-8078-3285-5
- Danky, James P., “Reading, Writing and Resistance: African-American Print Culture, 1880-1940.” In A History of the Book in America, Volume 4, edited by Carl Kaestle and Janice Radway. Cambridge: Cambridge University Press, 2008. ISBN 0-8078-3186-7
- Danky, James P., and Wayne A. Wiegand. Women in Print: Essays on the Print Culture of American Women from the Nineteenth and Twentieth Centuries. Madison, WI: University of Wisconsin Press, 2004.*
- Danky, James P. “Newspapers and Selected Periodicals.” In The Harvard Guide to African-American History, edited by Evelyn Brooks Higginbothum. Cambridge: Harvard University Press, 2001. ISBN 0-674-00276-8
- Danky, James African-American Newspapers and Periodicals, A National Bibliography. Cambridge, Harvard University Press, 1998.
- Danky, James P., and John Cherney. “Beyond Limbaugh: The Far Right’s Publishing Spectrum” Reference Services Review 24(1) (1996): 43-56.
- Danky, James P., Ken Fones-Wolf, and Elliott Shore, eds. The German-American Radical Press: From the 1840s to the 1930s. Champaign, IL: University of Illinois Press, 1992. ISBN 0-252-01830-3
- Danky, James P., and Wayne A Wiegand, eds. Print Culture in a Diverse America. Champaign, IL: University of Illinois Press, 1998. ISBN 0-252-02398-6 (Carey McWilliams Prize Winner, 1988)
- Danky, James P., ed. Native American Periodicals and Newspapers, 1828-1982: Bibliography, Publishing Record, and Holdings. Westport, CT: Greenwood Press, 1984. ISBN 0-313-23773-5
- Danky, James P., and Sanford Berman, eds. Alternative Library Literature: A Biennial Anthology (Ten Volumes). Jefferson, NC: McFarland, 1982-2000. ISBN 0-7864-1313-1 (2000/2001 ed.)
- Danky, James P., ed. Women’s Periodicals and Newspapers from the 18th Century to 1982: A Union List of the Holdings of Madison, Wisconsin Libraries. Boston: GK Hall, 1982. ISBN 0-8161-8107-1
- Danky, James P., and Elliott Shore, eds. Alternative Materials in Libraries. Metuchen, NJ: Scarecrow Press, 1982. ISBN 0-8108-1508-7
- Danky, James P., Neil Strache, et al. Black Periodicals and Newspapers: A Union List of Holdings in Libraries of the University of Wisconsin and the Library of the State Historical Society of Wisconsin. 2nd ed. Madison, WI: State Historical Society of Wisconsin, 1979. ISBN 0-87020-178-6
- Danky, James P., ed. Undergrounds: A Union List of Alternative Periodicals in Libraries of the United States and Canada. Madison, WI: State Historical Society of Wisconsin, 1974. ISBN 0-87020-142-5
