= Carl Kaestle =

American historian (born 1940)

- Born: March 27, 1940; Schenectady, New York
- Died: January 5, 2023 (aged 82); Bloomington, Indiana
- Spouse(s): Elizabeth MacKenzie, Elizabeth Hollander

Academic background
- Education: Yale University; Harvard University

Academic work
- Discipline: History of education
- Institutions: University of Wisconsin–Madison; University of Chicago; Brown University

Carl Frederick Kaestle (March 27, 1940 - January 5, 2023) was a Professor of Education, History, and Public Policy emeritus at Brown University. His historical research has focused on the development of American schools, particularly in the 1800s. He has worked at the University of Chicago and University of Wisconsin–Madison and was a former president of the National Academy of Education.

== Early life ==
Carl Frederick Kaestle was born on March 27, 1940, in Schenectady, New York. His parents were Francis Llewelyn Kaestle and Regina Perrault Kaestle, he was the second of three sons. "During high school he played piano professionally in Lake George" and continued his activity in musical organizations in his years at Yale. He graduated with a B.A. from Yale in 1962, and a Masters in 1964, when he taught and was a headmaster of Warsaw Elementary School in Poland for three years, the school was operated by the American Embassy. He went back to Harvard for his Ph.D. and graduated in 1971.

== Career ==
In 1970, Kaestle came to the University of Wisconsin–Madison and later became the William F. Vilas Research Professor in educational policy studies and history. He was the chair of Madison's educational policy studies department between 1978 and 1981. Towards the late 1980s, he had international renown as a historian of American education and literacy. His research has focused on the development of American schools, particularly in the 1800s. Kaestle co-founded the Center for the History of Print Culture in Modern America at the UW–Madison in 1992. He was the original chair of its advisory board, which gathered academics and librarians interested in print culture from across UW–Madison's campus.

In his 1983 Pillars of the Republic, Kaestle argued "... the eventual acceptance of state common-school systems was encouraged by Americans' commitment to republican government, by the dominance of native Protestant culture, and by the development of capitalism".

In 1995, Kaestle left the University of Wisconsin–Madison for the University of Chicago, and later became the University Professor and Professor of Education, History, and Public Policy emeritus at Brown University. He wrote a book on the history of federal involvement in elementary and secondary education from 1940 to 1980.

== Personal life ==
On June 6, 1964, Kaestle married Eliza K. MacKenzie in Wallingford, Connecticut. She was the daughter of W. Neal MacKenzie. She attended Prospect Hill School in New Haven and Wilson College in Chambersburg, PA and at the time of her marriage was a Junior at the Columbia Presbyterian Nursing School. She took a leave of absence at her marriage while Kaestle taught at the Warsaw Elementary School in Poland.

In 1997, Kaestle married Elizabeth Hollander (née Lynes) (1939–2015), the former commissioner of planning for the city of Chicago from 1983 until 1989, the first woman to serve in that post. Hollander was the daughter of Russell Lynes (1910–1991), the art historian, author and managing editor of Harper's Magazine and the niece of photographer George Platt Lynes (1907-1955).

Kaestle served as the former president of the National Academy of Education. Writing for The Journal of Interdisciplinary History, Harvey J. Graff declared Kaestle "one of the leading practitioners of American educational history". David Tyack referred to Kaestle's Pillars of the Republic as "the best interpretation of antebellum school development written thus far."

After his retirement, Kaestle continued "as a member of the Yale Alumni Chorus and enjoyed playing classical and jazz piano."

Kaestle and his first wife, Eliza had two daughters, Christine Elizabeth Kaestle (January 28, 1972 - July 16, 2020) and Frederika.
