= E. Jennifer Monaghan =

English educator and historian (1933–2014)

- Born: Edith Jennifer Monaghan; 19 January 1933; Cambridge, England
- Died: 14 September 2014 (aged 81)
- Occupations: Educator; historian
- Spouse: Charles Monaghan (m. 1958)
- Children: 3

Academic background
- Education: Oxford University (B.A., M.A.); University of Illinois Urbana-Champaign (M.A.); Yeshiva University (Ed.D.)

Academic work
- Main interests: Literacy education in early America
- Notable works: A Common Heritage: Noah Webster's Blue-Back Speller (1983)

E. Jennifer Monaghan (born Edith Jennifer Walker; 19 January 1933 – 14 September 2014), also known as Jennifer Monaghan, was an English educator and historian. She was regarded as the leading expert on literacy education in early America. She published three books and dozens of book chapters and journal articles.

== Education ==
Edith Jennifer Walker was born in Cambridge, England to Clement and Margery (née Elton) Walker. She was educated at Perse School for Girls. She received her B.A. and M.A. from Oxford University, where she attended Lady Margaret Hall and studied Greats (classics), receiving first-class honours in Honour Moderations. She received a Fulbright travel award and was sponsored by the English Speaking Union to teach as a graduate assistant at the University of Illinois at Urbana–Champaign, where she earned an M.A. in classical Greek.

After marrying journalist Charles Monaghan in 1958 in Cambridge, the couple moved to Brooklyn, New York, where they raised their three children. Later, she entered the reading education department of the Ferkauf Graduate School of Education at Yeshiva University in New York City, where she received an Ed.D in 1980, with a dissertation on Noah Webster and his blueback speller.

== Career ==
Monaghan was professor emerita of English at Brooklyn College of The City University of New York, where she specialised in developmental reading, English as a Second Language, and the teaching of composition. Her early work included articles on reading research and a historical examination of the problem of dyslexia.

In 1983 her dissertation, Noah Webster’s Speller, 1783–1843: Causes of Its Success as Reading Text, was a co-winner of the biennial Outstanding Dissertation Award offered by the Society for the Study of Curriculum. In 1975 Monaghan founded the History of Reading Special Interest Group of the International Reading Association, and was for many years an active member of its executive board. She served as editor or coeditor of its newsletter, "History of Reading News", from its inception in Fall 1976 to Spring 2002.

== The History of Literacy ==
Monaghan's interest in the study of the history of reading evolved by chance. She was volunteering as a tutor at a local public elementary school in Brooklyn and was dismayed at how reading was being taught. She began to look at the background of reading instruction and eventually completed her dissertation on Noah Webster's speller. Her first book, A Common Heritage: Noah Webster's Blue-Back Speller (1983), was an outgrowth of her dissertation. She also published numerous book chapters, journal and encyclopaedia articles, reviews, and a catalogue, including several coauthored with Douglas K. Hartman.

== The History of the Book ==
Monaghan began a general study of the history of reading instruction, eventually becoming involved in an area known as the "history of the book." Scholars investigate the impact that books have had upon our culture, looking at books and the connections among author and publisher, publisher and printer, printer and reader, as well as author and reader. The "history of the book" considers crucial topics such as the commercial aspects of reading, the cultural and social aspects, and so forth.

== The Charles and E. Jennifer Monaghan Collection ==
Young American Readers is an exhibition drawn from donations to the Kenneth Spencer Research Library from Charles and E. Jennifer Monaghan, totalling over 1,500 volumes.

== Selected publications ==
Books

- The Illustrated Phonics Booklet, illustrated by Virginia Cantarella (Greenville, New York, 2012)
- Learning to Read and Write in Colonial America (Amherst, Massachusetts: University of Massachusetts Press, in association with the American Antiquarian Society, 2005; released as paperback, 2007)
- Reading for the Enslaved, Writing for the Free: Reflections on Liberty and Literacy. The 1998 James Russell Wiggins Lecture in the History of the Book in American Culture (Worcester: American Antiquarian Society, 2000)
- A Common Heritage: Noah Webster’s Blue-Back Speller (Hamden, Conn.: Archon Books, 1983)

Books and Journals, Edited

- Susan E. Israel and E. Jennifer Monaghan, eds., Shaping the Reading Field: The Impact of Early Reading Pioneers, Scientific Research, and Progressive Ideas (Newark, Del.: International Reading Association, 2007).
- Guest editor, special issue, “Then and Now: Readers Learning to Write”, Visible Language 21 (1987).

Books, Translated

- Translator from French, Le Massacre des Indiens by Lucien Bodard. This was published as Green Hell (New York: Outerbridge & Dienstfrey, 1971) and as Massacre on the Amazon (London: Tom Stacey, 1971).

== Death ==
E. Jennifer Monaghan died on 14 September 2014 from a stroke, aged 81.
