= Johann Neem =

American historian

Johann N. Neem is an American historian. He is professor of history at Western Washington University. He has been an editor of the Journal of the Early Republic since 2020.

Neem was born in India. When he was a child, he moved with his parents from Mumbai to San Francisco. In 2004, he received a PhD in history from the University of Virginia.

== Books ==
- What's the Point of College?: Seeking Purpose in an Age of Reform
- Democracy's Schools: The Rise of Public Education in America
- Creating a Nation of Joiners (Harvard University Press)
