= Journal of the Early Republic =

- Discipline: Early American history (1776–1861)
- Language: English
- Edited by: Johann Neem and Ronald Angelo Johnson

Publication details
- History: 1980–present
- Publisher: The University of North Carolina Press on behalf of the Society for Historians of the Early American Republic (United States)
- Frequency: Quarterly

Standard abbreviations
- ISO 4: J. Early Repub.

Indexing
- ISSN: 0275-1275 (print); 1553-0620 (web)
- LCCN: 81643770
- JSTOR: 02751275
- OCLC no.: 44849568

Links
- Journal homepage; Online access at Project MUSE

The Journal of the Early Republic is a quarterly peer-reviewed academic journal which focuses on the early culture and history of the United States from 1776 to 1861. The journal is published by The University of North Carolina Press on behalf of the Society for Historians of the Early American Republic. The first issue published, Vol. 1, No. 1, was released in 1981. As of date, the current editors-in-chief are Johann Neem and Ronald Angelo Johnson.

When it was founded, the journal first issued stated it was dedicated to study of "the first six decades of the United States under the Federal Constitution", approximately 1789 to 1850, in the interest of breaking down barriers between the traditional periodization of the time into the Federalist Era, Jeffersonian Era, and Age of Jackson.

== Sources ==
- "Prologue". Journal of the Early Republic. 1 (1): v–vi. Spring 1981. JSTOR 3122771.
