= Richard D. Brown =

American historian

- Born: October 31, 1939 (age 86); New York City, US
- Occupation: Historian
- Title: Professor of History

Academic background
- Education: Harvard University (MA, PhD); Oberlin College (BA)

Academic work
- Discipline: American history
- Sub-discipline: American Revolution; Colonial America
- Institutions: University of Connecticut

Richard David Brown (born October 31, 1939) is an American historian specializing in colonial, revolutionary, and early American society and culture. He is a Board of Trustees Distinguished Professor of History Emeritus at the University of Connecticut, where he has taught since 1971.

== Early life and education ==
Born in New York City to parents Alvyn Adolph and Dorothy Kruskal Brown, Brown attended the Devereux Manor High School in Devon, Pennsylvania, and Fieldston School in New York. He earned a Bachelor of Arts degree from Oberlin College in 1961 and received a Woodrow Wilson Fellowship to attend Harvard University, where he earned a Master of Arts degree in 1962 and a PhD in history in 1966.

== Career and service ==
Brown began his academic career as a Fulbright lecturer at the University of Toulouse in France in 1965–1966. Returning to Oberlin College, he served as an assistant professor of history from 1967 to 1971. In 1971 he became an associate professor of history at the University of Connecticut, gaining promotion to full professor in 1975 and retiring in 2009. Brown chaired the history department from 1974 to 1980 and directed the University of Connecticut Humanities Institute from 2001 to 2009.

Brown has served as president of the New England Historical Association (1990–1991), a trustee of Old Sturbridge Village (1984–1987), editor-in-chief of the William and Mary Quarterly (1996–1998), and president of the Society for Historians of the Early American Republic (2001–2002). He was a research fellow at Harvard's Charles Warren Center for Studies in American History (1970–1971), a Social Science Research Council faculty fellow (1970–1971), a National Endowment for the Humanities principal investigator for early Massachusetts records (1974–1975), and a Guggenheim Fellow (1998–1999). In 1986, he was a co-recipient of the Charles F. Montgomery Prize awarded by the Decorative Arts Society of the Society of Architectural Historians. He has served as president of The New England Quarterly since 2015.

== Personal life ==
Brown married historian Irene Quenzler Brown (born April 26, 1938) on June 10, 1962. Like her husband, Irene Brown is a Harvard-educated historian (Ph.D. 1969) who taught at the University of Connecticut between 1978 and 2003, when she retired. The couple have two sons: Josiah Henry and Nicholas Alvyn.

== Published books ==
- Brown, Richard D (1962). Urbanization in Springfield, Massachusetts, 1790-1830. Springfield, MA: Connecticut Valley Historical Museum. OCLC 2275527.
- Brown, Richard D (1969). Slavery in American Society. Lexington, MA: D.C. Heath. OCLC 229639.
- Brown, Richard D (1970). Revolutionary Politics in Massachusetts: The Boston Committee of Correspondence and the Towns, 1772-1774. Cambridge, MA: Harvard University Press. ISBN 978-0-674-76781-2. OCLC 114698.
- Brown, Richard D.; Foner, Eric (1976). Modernization: The Transformation of American Life, 1600-1865. New York: Hill and Wang. ISBN 978-0-8090-6980-4. OCLC 2331648.
- Brown, Richard D (1978). Massachusetts: A Bicentennial History. New York: Norton. ISBN 978-0-393-05666-2. OCLC 3966162.
- O'Brien, Robert; Brown, Richard D (1985). The Encyclopedia of New England. New York: Facts on File. ISBN 978-0-87196-759-6. OCLC 8689056.
- Brown, Richard D. (1991). Knowledge is Power: The Diffusion of Information in Early America, 1700-1865. New York: Oxford University Press. ISBN 978-0-19-507265-5. OCLC 955683485.
- Brown, Richard D (1996). The Strength of a People: The Idea of an Informed Citizenry in America, 1650-1870. Chapel Hill, NC: University of North Carolina Press. ISBN 978-0-8078-6058-8. OCLC 44960838.
- Brown, Richard D; Tager, Jack (2000). Massachusetts: A Concise History. Amherst: University of Massachusetts Press. ISBN 978-1-55849-248-6. OCLC 43615770.
- Brown, Irene Quenzler; Brown, Richard D (2003). The Hanging of Ephraim Wheeler: A Story of Rape, Incest, and Justice in Early America. Cambridge, MA: Belknap Press of Harvard University Press. ISBN 978-0-674-01020-8. OCLC 50906132.
- Brown, Richard D; Carp, Benjamin L (2014). Major Problems in the Era of the American Revolution, 1760-1791: Documents and Essays (3rd ed.). Cengage Learning. ISBN 978-0-495-91332-0. OCLC 926093030.
- Ben-Atar, Doron S; Brown, Richard D. (2014). Taming Lust: Crimes against Nature in the Early Republic. Philadelphia: University of Pennsylvania Press. ISBN 978-0-8122-0925-9. OCLC 961585966.
- Brown, Richard D (2017). Self-evident Truths: Contesting Equal Rights from the Revolution to the Civil War. New Haven, CT: Yale University Press. ISBN 978-0-300-22762-8. OCLC 975419750.
