= Publishing =

Production and distribution of media

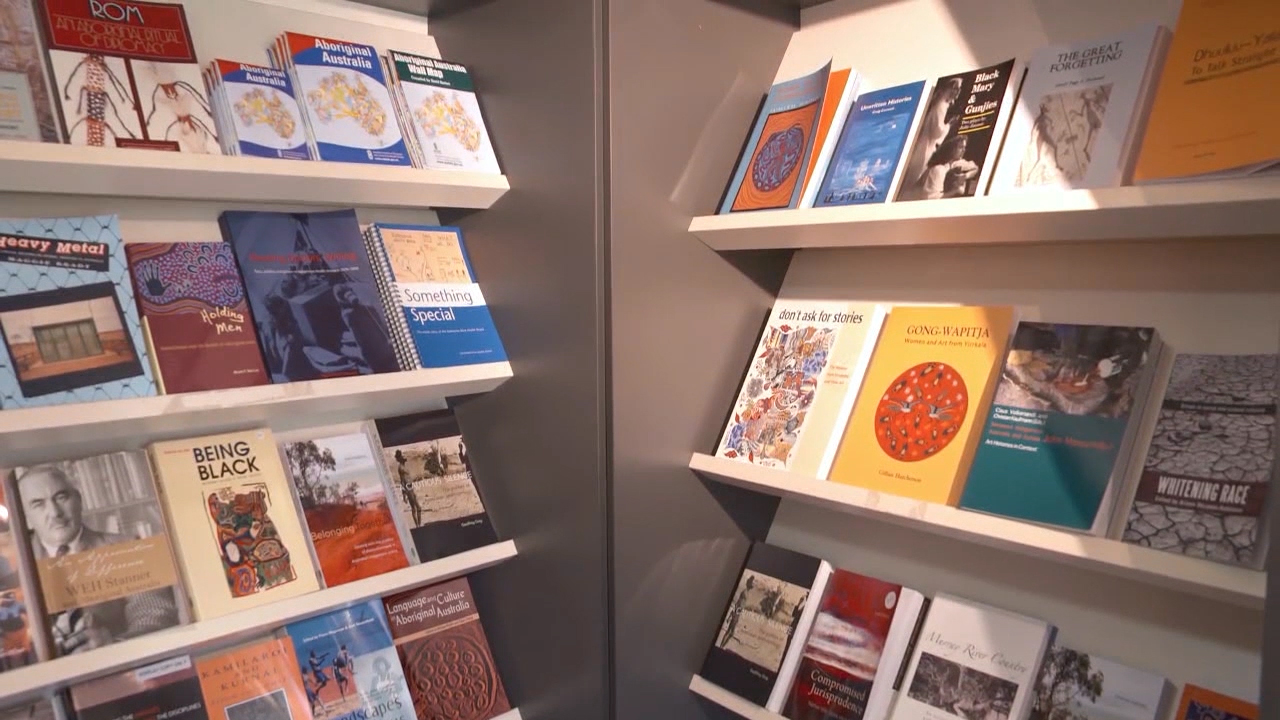
The Aboriginal Studies Press (ASP) bookshop at the Australian Institute of Aboriginal and Torres Strait Islander Studies

Publishing is the process of making information, literature, music, software, and other content, whether in physical or digital form, available to the public for sale or free of charge. Traditionally, the term publishing refers to the creation and distribution of printed works, such as books, zines, comic books, newspapers, and magazines, to the public. The advent of digital information systems has led to an expansion of its scope to include digital publishing, such as e-books, digital magazines, websites, social media, music, and video game publishing.

The commercial publishing industry ranges from large multinational conglomerates such as News Corp, Pearson, Penguin Random House, and Thomson Reuters to major retail brands and thousands of small independent publishers. It has various divisions such as trade/retail publishing of fiction and non-fiction, educational publishing, and academic and scientific publishing. Publishing is also undertaken by governments, civil society, and private companies for administrative or compliance requirements, business, research, advocacy, or public interest objectives. This can include annual reports, research reports, market research, policy briefings, and technical reports.

Publishing has evolved from a small, ancient form limited by law or religion to a modern, large-scale industry disseminating all types of information.

"Publisher" can refer to a publishing company, an organization, or an individual who leads a publishing company, imprint, periodical, or newspaper.

== Stages of publishing ==
The publishing process covering most magazine, journal, and book publishers includes: (Different stages are applicable to different types of publishers).

1. Commissioning
2. Writing
3. Copy editing
4. Design
5. Copywriting
6. Typesetting
7. Proofreading
8. Correction cycles
9. Indexing
10. Final corrections
11. Web publishing
12. Prepress
13. Printing
14. Post press
15. Distribution
16. Marketing

== Types of publishers ==
=== Newspaper publishing ===
Newspapers and news websites publish current reports, articles, and features written by journalists. They are available through individual purchases, paid subscriptions, or for free. These publications feature photographs or other media, and they are usually subsidized with advertising. They generally cover local, national, and international news, or feature a particular industry. Some organizations charge premium fees if they have expertise and exclusive knowledge. The news industry is meant to serve the public interest, hold people and businesses accountable, and promote freedom of information and expression. Editors manage the tone of their publication; for example, negative versus positive articles can affect the reader's perspective.

=== Journal publishing ===
A journal is an academic or technical publication available in digital, print, or both formats, containing articles written by researchers, professors, and industry experts. These publications are specific to a particular field and often push the boundaries established within that discipline. To ensure validity and high quality, they usually require submissions to undergo peer review.

=== Magazine publishing ===
A magazine is a periodical published at regular intervals. It features creative layouts, photography, and illustrations that cover a particular subject or interest. Magazines are available in print or digital formats, and they can be purchased individually or as a subscription.

=== Book publishing ===
The global book publishing industry consists of books categorized as fiction or non-fiction and print, e-book, or audiobook. The book market is huge, with around 1.5 billion people speaking English. Translation services are also available to make these texts accessible in other languages. Self-publishing makes publishing widely accessible through small print-run digital printing or online self-publishing platforms. E-reader screen technology continues to improve with increased contrast and resolution making them more comfortable to read. Each book has a registered ISBN to identify it.

=== Directory publishing ===
Directories contain searchable indexed data about businesses, products, and services. They were printed in the past but are now mostly online. Directories are available as searchable lists, on a map, as a sector-specific portal, as a review site (expert or consumer), or as a comparison site. Although some businesses may not consider themselves publishers, the way the data is displayed is published.

=== Textbook publishing ===
A textbook is an educational book, or e-book, that contains information on a particular subject and is used by people studying that subject. The need for textbook publishing continues due to the global need for education. Textbooks from major publishers are being integrated with online learning platforms for expert knowledge and access to a library of books with digital content. A university press is an academic publisher run by a university. Oxford University Press is the largest in the world and specializes in research, education, and English language teaching internationally.

=== Catalog publishing ===
A catalog is a visual directory or list of a large range of products that allow you to browse and buy from a particular company. In print, this is usually in the format of a softback book or directory. Smaller visual catalogs can be known as brochures. With the Internet, they have evolved into searchable databases of products known under the term e-commerce. Interactive catalogs and brochures like IKEA and Avon allow customers to browse a full range if they have not decided on their purchase. Responsive web and app design will allow further integration between interactive catalog visuals and searchable product databases.

=== Web publishing ===
Until recently, physical books were the primary source of recording knowledge. For accessibility and global reach, this content can be repurposed for the web. The British Library, for example, holds more than 170 million items with 3 million new additions each year. With consent, content can be published online through e-books, audio books, CMS-based websites, online learning platforms, videos, or mobile apps. On the Internet, writers and copy editors are known as content writers and content editors, although their roles vary from their print-based counterparts.

=== Advertising ===
Advertising can provide income or a subsidized income for publishers. If the advertising has a return on investment (ROI), the publisher can boost income exponentially by increasing the spending. An ROI of up to £10 per £1 invested is possible, as seen in the John Lewis & Partners Christmas campaigns. Likewise, any cost savings that harm the customer/consumer experience can impact a brand in the long term. Multichannel marketing can be more cost-effective in creating an immersive experience that cannot be replicated with one channel. For example, when considering marketing spend, a shop with a small margin (or none at all) compared to a website is very cost-effective because it acts as a huge billboard that offers a browsing experience that enables consumers to make purchasing decisions. It gives them a feel for the brand, has a presence in the community, and creates jobs. Also, using social media publishing to advertise has a good ROI if trending, high-quality content is created that reflects positively on the brand.

=== Tie-in publishing ===
Film, television, radio, and advertisements publish information to their audiences. Computer games, streaming apps, and social media publish content in various ways that can keep audiences more engaged. Marketing additional products closely related to a major film, such as Star Wars, is an example of tie-in publishing. These products include but are not limited to spin-off books, graphic novels, soundtrack albums, computer games, models and toys, social media posts, and promotional publications. Examples of tie-in publishing based on books are the Harry Potter and James Bond franchises.

== Book publishing sub-divisions ==
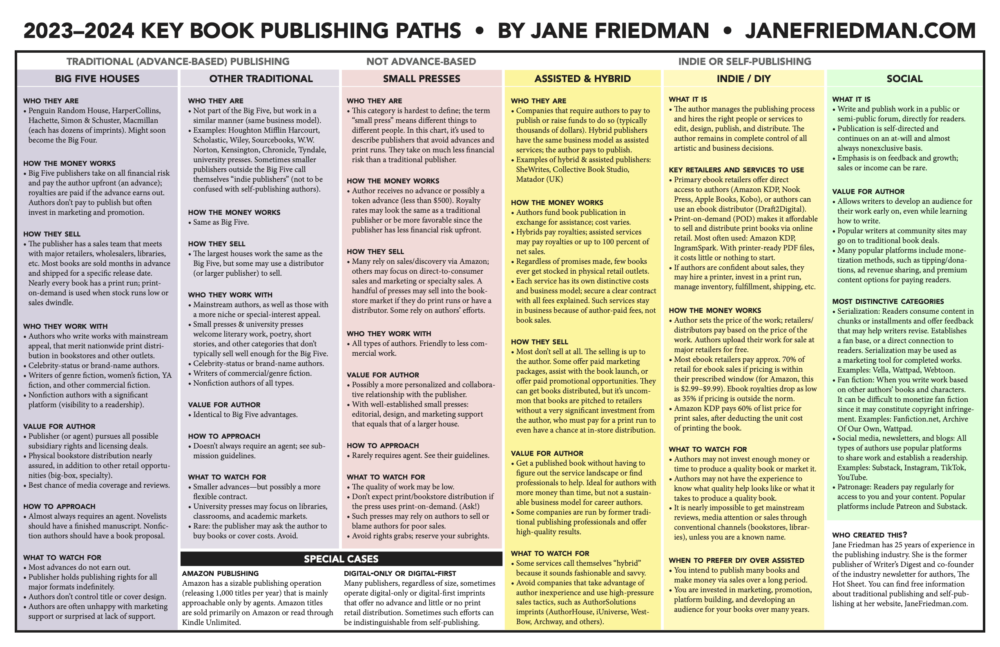

The publishing landscape is continually evolving. Currently there are four major types of publishers in book publishing:

=== Mainstream publishers ===
These companies traditionally produce hardcopy books in large print runs. They have established networks which distribute those books to bricks-and-mortar stores and libraries.

When a mainstream publisher accepts a book for publication, they require the author to sign a contract surrendering some rights to the publisher. In exchange, the publisher will take care of all aspects of publishing the book at the publisher's cost. They rely entirely on sales of the book to recoup those costs and make a profit. The author receives a royalty on each sale (and sometimes an advance on royalties when the book is accepted). Because of the financial risk, mainstream publishers are extremely selective in what they will publish, and reject most manuscripts submitted to them.

In 2013, Penguin (owned by Pearson) and Random House (owned by Bertelsmann) merged, narrowing the mainstream publishing industry to a handful of big publishers as it adapted to digital media. The merger created the largest consumer book publisher globally, with a global market share of more than 25 percent. As of 2022, approximately 80% percent of the United States trade market for books was controlled by the "Big Five" publishing houses: Penguin Random House, Hachette, HarperCollins, Simon & Schuster, and Macmillan.

In November 2020, ViacomCBS agreed to sell Simon & Schuster, the third largest book publisher in the United States, to Penguin Random House in a deal that, if it had gone through, would have formed the largest publishing company in the world. On November 2, 2021, the United States Department of Justice filed a lawsuit (U.S. v. Bertelsmann SE & CO. KGaA, et al.) to block the merger on antitrust grounds, and on October 31, 2022, the D.C. District Court ruled in favor of the Department of Justice, filing a permanent injunction on the merger.

Although newspaper and magazine companies still often own printing presses and binderies, book publishers rarely do. Similarly, the trade usually sells the finished products through a distributor who stores and distributes the publisher's wares for a percentage fee or sells on a sale or return basis.

Some major publishers have entire divisions devoted to a single franchise, e.g., Ballantine Del Rey LucasBooks has the exclusive rights to Star Wars in the United States; Random House UK (Bertelsmann)/Century LucasBooks holds the same rights in the United Kingdom. The video game industry self-publishes through BL Publishing/Black Library (Warhammer) and Wizards of the Coast (Dragonlance, Forgotten Realms, etc.). The BBC has its own publishing division that does very well with long-running series such as Doctor Who. These multimedia works are cross-marketed aggressively, and sales frequently outperform the average stand-alone published work, making them a focus of corporate interest.

The advent of the Internet has provided an alternative mode of book distribution and most mainstream publishers also offer their books in ebook format. Preparing a book for e-book publication is the same as print publication, with only minor variations in the process to account for the different publishing mediums; E-book publication also eliminates some costs like the discount given to retailers (usually around 45 percent).

=== Small presses ===
Small publishers, also called independent or indie publishers, operate on a traditional model (i.e. the author surrenders some rights in exchange for the publisher bearing all costs of publishing), but their precise terms can vary greatly. Often, they do not pay an advance on royalties.

=== Hybrid publishing ===
A hybrid publisher shares the costs of publication (and therefore the risks) with the author. Because of this financial risk, they are selective in what they publish. The contract varies according to what is negotiated between author and company, but will always include the surrender of some rights to the publisher. Hybrid publishing is the source of debate in the publishing industry, due to the tendency of vanity presses to masquerade as hybrids.

=== Vanity presses ===
A vanity press will publish any book. In return, the author must cover all the costs of publication, surrender some rights to the publisher, and pay royalties on sales. Vanity presses often engage in deceptive practices or offer costly, poor-quality services with limited recourse available to the writer. In the US, these practices have been cited by the Better Business Bureau as unfavorable reports by consumers. Given the bad reputation of vanity publishing, many vanity presses brand themselves as hybrid publishers. The Society of Authors (SoA) and the Writers' Guild of Great Britain (WGGB) have called for reform of the paid-for publishing sector. These unions, representing 14,800 authors, jointly published a report to expose widespread bad practices among companies that charge writers to publish their work while taking away their rights.

=== Self-publishing ===
When an author self-publishes a book, they retain all rights and assume responsibility for all stages of preparing, publishing and distributing the book. The author may hire professionals on a fee-for-service basis as needed, (e.g. an editor, cover designer, proofreader) or engage a company to provide an integrated package.

== Recent developments ==
Accessible publishing uses the digitization of books to mark them up into XML and produce multiple formats to sell to customers, often targeting those who experience difficulty reading. Formats include a variety of larger print sizes, specialized print formats for dyslexia, eye tracking problems, and macular degeneration, as well as Braille, DAISY, audiobooks, and e-books.

Green publishing means adapting the publishing process to minimize environmental impact. One example is the concept of on-demand printing, using digital or print-on-demand technology. This cuts down the need to ship books since they are manufactured close to the customer on a just-in-time basis.

A further development is the growth of online publishing, where no physical books are produced. The author creates an e-book and uploads it to a website, from which anyone can download and read it.

An increasing number of authors are using niche marketing online to sell more books by engaging with their readers online.

Some publishers can show political homophily or political bias.

== Standardization ==
Refer to the ISO divisions of ICS 01.140.40 and 35.240.30 for further information.

== Legal issues ==
Publication is the distribution of copies or content to the public. The Berne Convention requires that this can only be done with the consent of the copyright holder, which initially is always the author. In the Universal Copyright Convention, "publication" is defined in Article VI as "the reproduction in tangible form and the general distribution to the public of copies of a work from which it can be read or otherwise visually perceived."

== Privishing ==
Privishing (private publishing, but not to be confused with self-publishing) is a modern term for publishing a book but printing so few copies or with such lack of marketing, advertising, or sales support that it effectively does not reach the public. The book, while nominally published, is almost impossible to obtain through normal channels such as bookshops, often cannot be ordered specially, and has a notable lack of support from its publisher, including refusal to reprint the title. A book that is privished may be referred to as "killed". Depending on the motivation, privishing may constitute a breach of contract, censorship, or good business practice (e.g., not printing more books than the publisher believes will sell in a reasonable length of time).

== History ==
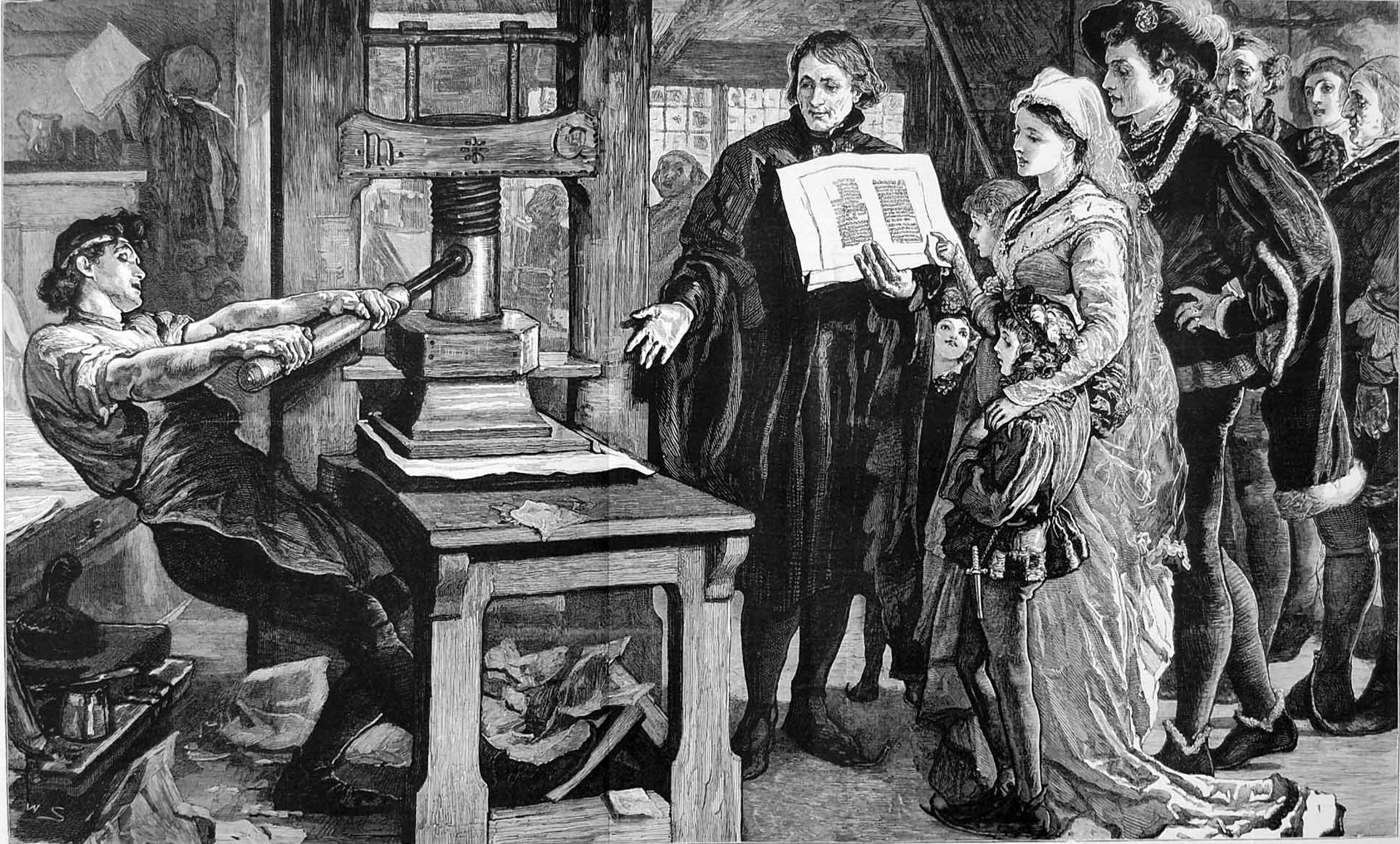
Printer working an early Gutenberg letterpress from the 15th century (1877 engraving)

Publishing became possible with the invention of writing and became more practical upon the introduction of printing. Before printing, distributed works were copied manually by scribes. Due to printing, publishing progressed hand-in-hand with the development of books.

The Chinese inventor Bi Sheng made a movable type of earthenware c. 1045, but there are no known surviving examples of his work. The Korean civil servant Ch'oe Yun-ŭi, who lived during the Goryeo Dynasty, invented the first metal moveable type in 1234–1250 AD.

=== Europe ===
Johannes Gutenberg developed movable type in Europe around 1450, along with innovations in casting the type based on a matrix and hand mould. The invention of the printing press gradually made books less expensive to produce and more widely available.

Early printed books, single sheets, and images created before 1501 in Europe are known as incunables or incunabula. "A man born in 1453, the year of the fall of Constantinople, could look back from his fiftieth year on a lifetime in which about eight million books had been printed, more perhaps than all the scribes of Europe had produced since Constantine founded his city in A.D. 330."

The history of modern newspaper publishing started in Germany in 1609, with the publication of magazines following in 1663.

Historians describe the last third of the eighteenth century of the German book trade as the Sturm und Drang period, German for "storm and stress."

Missionaries brought printing presses to sub-Saharan Africa in the mid-18th century.

Historically, publishing has been handled by publishers, although some authors self-published.

=== United States ===
The US publishing industry began with a printing press in Massachusetts in 1638, establishing New England as an early hub. Philadelphia also became significant, with William Bradford setting up the first paper mill and Benjamin Franklin opening his own press. By the mid-19th century, New York City became the industry's center, marked by the rise of large publishing houses like Harper, Wiley, Putnam, and Scribner, who benefited from copyright laws and new distribution methods. Initially, they heavily relied on pirated British works until international copyright laws were established in 1891. The mid-19th century also saw innovations like paperback "dime novels" making literature more accessible. The post-World War I era was a boom for American publishing with new writers and publishers like Simon & Schuster and Random House emerging. The Great Depression caused a setback, but the industry recovered post-war. Since the 1960s, there's been a trend of mergers and consolidation, accelerating with the rise of online retailers and ebooks, though New York City remains a major global publishing center, home to the "Big Five" publishers (including HarperCollins, Penguin Random House, and Simon & Schuster) and major educational publishers like Macmillan Learning, McGraw-Hill, Scholastic, and Wiley, alongside numerous independent publishers. Starting with Cornell University Press in 1869 and Johns Hopkins University Press in 1878, many universities set up publishing houses to publish scholarly books and journals of this sort produced by their faculty and graduate students. In the 21st century, however, financial pressures. have been reducing their output.

A U.S.-based study in 2016 that surveyed 34 publishers found that straight, able-bodied, white females overwhelmingly represent the publishing industry in the US. Salon described the situation as a "lack of diversity behind the scenes in book world." A survey in 2020 by the same group found there has been no significant statistical change in the lack of diversity since the 2016 survey. Lack of diversity in the American publishing industry has been an issue for years. Within the industry, the least amount of diversity was in higher-level editorial positions.

=== Internet Age ===
The establishment of the World Wide Web in 1989 soon propelled the website into a dominant publishing medium. Wikis and blogs soon developed, followed by online books, online newspapers, and online magazines. This also facilitated the technological convergence of commercial and self-published content and the convergence of publishing and production into online production through the development of multimedia content.

== Statistics ==
According to the report The Global Publishing Industry in 2022, published by the World Intellectual Property Organization, there is data available for 24 countries about the number of publications published in the educational and trade sector:

Total number of titles published by sector, 2022
Country	Total	Trade	Educational
Austria (Note: 2021 data.)	12,157	-	-
Belarus (Note: print format only.)	8,586	3,938	4,648
Belgium (Note: French-speaking region.)	10,559	-	-
Brazil	146,575	85,555	61,020
Colombia	15,411	9,433	5,978
Cuba	1,554	1,431	123
Czech Republic	13,413	6,896	6,517
Denmark	11,859	-	-
Ecuador	6,600	5,246	1,354
Estonia	5,534	-	-
Finland	12,390	9,004	3,386
France	111,503	83,116	28,387
Germany	71,524	-	-
Greece	13,218	8,043	5,175
Hungary (Note: trade sector only.)	16,045	16,045	-
Iceland	1,046	1,046	-
Ireland	2,162	1,815	347
Italy	121,127	-	-
Japan	68,429	66,885	1,544
Kyrgyzstan	1,003	800	203
Lebanon	2,500	-	-
Malta	571	428	143
Mexico	18,589	7,973	10,616
New Zealand	2,475	621	1,854
Norway	66,212	52,036	14,176
Philippines	5,792	1,519	4,273
Portugal	21,115	-	-
Russia	81,615	45,151	36,464
South Korea	64,657	64,657	-
Spain	83,091	-	-
Sweden	7,475	7,475	-
Thailand	16,031	13,805	2,226
Togo	78	61	17
Turkey	206,674	115,413	91,261
United Kingdom	153,000	-	-
Ukraine	16,786	10,213	6,573

== See also ==
General
- A History of the Book in America
- Accessible publishing
- Book series
- Concentration of media ownership
- Editions
- Global spread of the printing press
- Lists of publishing companies
- List of book distributors
- Mass media
- Media proprietor
- Open access publishing
- Open publishing
- Paperback
- Publication
- Self-publishing
- Serials, periodicals and journals
- Small press
- Zines

Publishing on specific contexts

- Academic publishing
- Books published per country per year
- List of best-selling books
- Document management system
- Scientific literature

Publishing tools

- Desktop publishing
- Electronic publishing
- Mobile publishing
- Web publishing tools

== Publications ==
- Amory, H., & Hall, D. D. (2005). Bibliography and the book trades : studies in the print culture of early New England. University of Pennsylvania Press.
- Patten, E., McElligott, J. (Eds). (2014). The perils of print culture: book, print and publishing history in theory and practice. Palgrave Macmillan.
- Johns, Adrian. (1998). The Nature of the Book: Print and Knowledge in the Making. University of Chicago Press.
- Noorda, Rachel, & Norrick-Rühl, Corinna. (2025). Research Methods in Publishing and Book Studies. Routledge.
