= Gutenberg in Shanghai =

2004 non-fiction book by Christopher Alexander Reed

Gutenberg in Shanghai: Chinese Print Capitalism, 1876–1937 is a non-fiction book by Christopher Alexander Reed, published in 2004 by the University of British Columbia Press.

The work focuses on how entities in China took the style of press printing that had been used in Western countries.

It is distributed in the United States by University of Hawaii Press.

== Background ==
The author studied at the University of California, Berkeley for his PhD and made a thesis, published in 1998. This thesis was used to create this book.

The sources used originate from China and from Western countries. Sourcing from the People's Republic of China was a large component used to develop the first chapter. The author did not use sourcing from Japan.

The author used documents in archives, documents from missionaries, works of fiction, interviews with people who worked as apprentices in print operations, memoirs, trade organization documents, and other primary sources as a means of referencing the work. The interviews had been conducted in the 1950s. Ling A. Shiao of St. Mary's College of California described some of the sourcing as "difficult-to-find".

== Contents ==
The first chapter "Gutenberg’s Descendants: Transferring Industrialized Printing Technology to China, 1807-1930," stated that the initial efforts to do printing in China did sell well because compatible fonts that looked pleasing in Chinese languages had not yet arrived.

"Sooty Sons of Vulcan," the third chapter, described the industry as it developed in Shanghai.

Unions and collective groups used to manage the industry are described in the fourth chapter.

Commercial Press, World Books, and Zhonghua Book Company are described in the fifth chapter.

== Reception ==
Tani E. Barlow of the University of Washington, Seattle stated that the work is "a generous, learned book", and that the illustrations provided in the book were done "lavishly". Barlow praised how the work is "helpful" in finding solutions to "the problems that confront cultural historians."

Reviewer Andrea Janku described the book as "coherent and unique", and "very readable and valuable".

Shiao described the work as "pioneering", with the "focus on technology and business organizations" being the "most significant contribution".

== See also ==
- The Power of Print in Modern China
- Printing and Book Culture in Late Imperial China
