= Printing and Book Culture in Late Imperial China =

2005 nonfiction book

Printing and Book Culture in Late Imperial China is a 2005 book edited by Cynthia J. Brokaw and Kai-wing Chow, published by University of California Press.

== Contents ==
There are 11 essays in the book.

The book starts with two essays, one by Cynthia J. Brokaw and Joseph McDermott. The former examines how the book publishing cultures differ between China and Western countries and her advocacy for studying things in the Annales school style, while McDermott's essay, "The Ascendance of Imprint in China," explores how printing developed in the Ming dynasty.

Lucille Chia's essay on the Ming dynasty-era Three Mountain Street in Nanjing, Anne E. McLaren's essay on different reading texts for different groups of people, and Brokaw's essay on Qing dynasty-era publishing in more distant areas of China were three essays focusing on the commercial printing industry.

Additionally, Robert E. Hegel's essay describes fiction publishing, Katherine Carlitz's essay describes Ming dynasty-era writers of plays, Evelyn S. Rawski's article describes publishing of works not written in Chinese languages during the Qing dynasty, and Xu Xiaomen's article describes genealogical documents in the Qing era and in the Republic of China. Rawski's article includes information on works in the Manchu, Mongolian, and Tibetic languages. It does not include information on works in Uighur.

Anne Burkus-Chasson's article describes Lingyan ge (劉源敬繪凌煙閣) by Liu Yuan (劉源). Book illustrations meant to teach lessons are described in Julia K. Murray's essay.

== Reception ==
Michael Dzanko of Ashland University stated that the book is "striking".

Dennis Joseph, author of Writing, Publishing, and Reading Local Gazetteers in Imperial China, 1100–1700, described the book as "important".

Peter F. Kornicki of the University of Cambridge stated that the first essay by Brokaw is "masterly".

== See also ==
- Gutenberg in Shanghai
- The Power of Print in Modern China
- Through a Forest of Chancellors - A book by Burkus-Chasson which describes her topic in detail
