= Janice Radway =

American scholar

Janice Radway (born January 29, 1949) is an American literary and cultural studies scholar. She is known for her scholarship on the history of reading culture.

== Education ==
Radway holds a Bachelor of Arts from Michigan State University (1971) and a Master of Arts from Stony Brook University (1972). She earned her PhD in English and American studies from Michigan State University in 1977 with the dissertation A Phenomenological Theory of Popular and Elite Literature.

== Career ==
Radway taught in the American Civilization Department at the University of Pennsylvania. She also chaired the Literature Program at Duke University, where she is now professor emerita. She is also professor emerita of communications studies at Northwestern University.

From 1998 to 1999, she served as president of the American Studies Association. She has served as an editor of its journal, American Quarterly. In 2011, she won the Carl Bode-Norman Holmes Pearson Prize for Outstanding Lifetime Contributions to American Studies.

In 2009, she received an honorary doctorate from Uppsala University.

She was the 2015-2016 Founders' Fellow at the National Humanities Center.

== Publications ==
- Reading the Romance (1984)
- A Feeling for Books (1999)
- Print in Motion (as co-editor, 2008)
- American Studies: An Anthology (as co-editor, 2009)
- Books: Their History and Future (2010)
- Listening to Images (2021)
