= Society for Historians of the Early American Republic =

The Society for Historians of the Early American Republic (SHEAR) is an organization that was established in 1977 to study the history of the United States in the period between 1775 and 1861.

The Society holds annual conferences, awards prizes and fellowships, and publishes the Journal of the Early Republic.

== Members ==
- Richard D. Brown
- Joanne B. Freeman
- Annette Gordon-Reed
- Daniel Walker Howe
- Alan Taylor (historian)
