= Harvey J. Graff =

American historian (born 1949)

- Born: June 19, 1949 (age 77)
- Known for: Scholarship on social history and the history of literacy

Academic work
- Discipline: Urban history; Cultural history; History of literacy; Interdisciplinarity
- Institutions: Ohio State University; University of Texas at San Antonio; Loyola University of Chicago (visiting professor); Simon Fraser University (visiting professor)

Harvey J. Graff (born June 19, 1949) is a comparative social and cultural historian of North America and Western Europe

He is a professor emeritus of English and History and Ohio Eminent Scholar in Literacy Studies at Ohio State University. Graff's scholarship spans multiple areas, including the history of literacy; childhood, youth and family; urban history; interdisciplinarity; and higher education.

His work on the history and social contexts of literacy has been published in multiple languages and countries. He is also known internationally for his contributions across several academic fields, particularly in the development of interdisciplinary approaches to historical and social analysis.

== Education ==
Harvey J. Graff received the Bachelor of Arts degree in history and sociology from Northwestern University in 1970 followed by Master of Arts from The University of Toronto in 1971, and his Doctor of Philosophy both in history and history of education, also from The University of Toronto in 1975.

He was a Woodrow Wilson and Central Mortgage and Housing Corporation fellow.

== Personal life ==
Harvey J. Graff was born to Milton and Ruthe Graff and grew up in Pittsburgh, Pennsylvania. He is married to Vicki L. W. Graff.

== Academic career ==
Graff began his academic teaching career in 1973 as an Instructor in the Summer School at Northwestern University, shortly after completing his doctoral coursework.

From 1974 to 1975, he served as an Extramural Lecturer at the Ontario Institute for Studies in Education, University of Toronto.

In 1975, Graff became a founding faculty member of the University of Texas at Dallas, where he spent more than two decades in the School of Arts and Humanities, rising from Assistant Professor to Associate Professor (with tenure) and Full Professor of History and Humanities.

During this period, he played a role in mentoring doctoral students and securing numerous research grants, including support from the American Council of Learned Societies, the Spencer Foundation, the National Endowment for the Humanities, and the National Science Foundation. During his tenure at UT Dallas from 1975 to 1998, he was also active in supervising doctoral students and securing multiple internal and external research grants. He was active in public history and public humanities. He founded the Dallas Social History Group in 1981.

Graff also held appointments during this period as Visiting Adjunct Professor of History at Loyola University Chicago in 1980 and Visiting Professor of English and Education at Simon Fraser University, Canada, in the summers of 1981 and 1982.

In 1998, Graff was appointed professor of history at the University of Texas at San Antonio (UTSA), where he also served as director of the Division of Behavioral and Cultural Sciences from 1998 to 1999. His interdisciplinary role extended across UTSA's doctoral and graduate programs, including the Ph.D. Program in Culture, Literacy, and Language, the Department of English, and the graduate faculty in Public Administration. His time at UTSA was marked by faculty development awards and research leave, as well as growing national leadership in interdisciplinary scholarship.

In 1999, Graff was elected president of the Social Science History Association (SSHA) for its 25th anniversary year of 2000, following his term as vice president in 1998.

In his presidential address Graff argued that traditional historians had successfully counterattacked against quantification and the innovations of the "new social history":

The case against the new mixed and confused a lengthy list of ingredients, including the following: history’s supposed loss of identity and humanity in the stain of social science, the fear of subordinating quality to quantity, conceptual and technical fallacies, violation of the literary character and biographical base of “good” history (rhetorical and aesthetic concern), loss of audiences, derogation of history rooted in “great men” and “great events,” trivialization in general, a hodge-podge of ideological objections from all directions, and a fear that new historians were reaping research funds that might otherwise come to their detractors. To defenders of history as they knew it, the discipline was in crisis, and the pursuit of the new was a major cause.

In 2001, in recognition of his contributions to historical scholarship and the interdisciplinary field of literacy studies, Graff was awarded the Doctor of Philosophy honoris causa by Linköping University in Sweden.

In 2004, Graff was appointed the inaugural Ohio Eminent Scholar in Literacy Studies and Professor of English and History at The Ohio State University. The Eminent Scholar appointment is the university's highest faculty recognition. It is endowed by the state to support distinguished scholars who advance cross-disciplinary innovation. At Ohio State, Graff held faculty positions in the Departments of English and History and cultivated affiliations with the Department of Comparative Studies and several university-wide research centers and interdisciplinary initiatives. His affiliations included the Diversity and Identity Studies Collective (DISCO), the Humanities Institute, the Kirwan Institute for the Study of Race and Ethnicity, the Mershon Center for International Security Studies, the International Poverty Solutions Collaborative, Project Narrative, Popular Culture Studies, the Neighborhood Institute, and the Future of the University Group.

Graff's institutional contribution at Ohio State was the founding of LiteracyStudies@OSU in 2005, an interdisciplinary initiative that he directed until 2016.

LiteracyStudies@OSU facilitated collaborative research, curricular development, and public programming, helping to define literacy studies as a dynamic interdisciplinary field.

After retiring from active teaching in 2017, Graff was named Professor Emeritus of English and History.

=== Post-Retirement Work ===
Following his retirement, Graff remains active in public education, extending his teaching and scholarly engagement beyond the university.

He continues to mentor former doctoral students and advise junior faculty on research, publication, and professional development. His post-retirement work includes virtual lectures, scholarly forums, and ongoing collaborations with students and colleagues in the United States and internationally.

From 2021 to 2024, he was the author of a regular column, “Busting Myths,” in the Columbus Free Press, where he applied historical and interdisciplinary analysis to contemporary issues, including higher education, urban development, and misinformation. He contributes essays to outlets such as Inside Higher Ed and Times Higher Education, where he writes on topics including interdisciplinarity, public engagement, and academic freedom.

He also participates in educational outreach at multiple levels, engaging with high school and undergraduate students on research topics such as critical race theory and urban history and politics. In 2022, he delivered a virtual faculty development lecture on interdisciplinarity to Zayed University in the United Arab Emirates.

His public education activities form part of a broader post-retirement initiative he describes as “Harvey U,” a non-traditional, global educational effort.

In 2022, he was named Academy Professor in the Ohio State University Emeritus Academy. In 2023, he was elected to full membership in the American Antiquarian Society and nominated to the American Academy of Arts and Sciences, the American Philosophical Society, and the National Academy of Education.

In 2024, Graff published his hybrid autobiography, My Life With Literacy: The Continuing Education of a Historian. The Intersections of the Personal, the Political, the Academic, and Place (WAC Clearinghouse Publications and University of Colorado Press).

His new book is Reconstructing the "Uni-versity": From the Ashes of the " Mega- and Multi-versity" to the Futures of Higher Education " (Bloomsbury Academic).

== Areas of research ==
=== History of Literacy ===
Graff is known as a founding figure in the historical study of literacy and the New Literacy Studies. His work has fundamentally shaped how scholars understand the role of literacy in social development, cultural change, and historical interpretation. Through pioneering books, essays, and collaborative projects, Graff helped to establish literacy as a subject of rigorous historical inquiry. His landmark book The Literacy Myth: Literacy and Social Structure in the Nineteenth-Century City (1979; revised editions 1991, 2023) challenged the longstanding assumption that literacy automatically correlates with economic advancement or social mobility. In this and subsequent publications, such as The Legacies of Literacy (1987) and The Labyrinths of Literacy (1987/1995), Graff demonstrated that the meanings and functions of literacy vary significantly across time, place, and social context.

=== History of Children, Youth, and Family ===
Graff is known as a pioneering figure in the interdisciplinary field of the history of children, youth, and family. His scholarship emphasizes the historically contingent and socially constructed nature of childhood and adolescence, challenging universalized or ahistorical understandings of growing up. A foundational work in this area is his widely cited article, "Interdisciplinary Explorations in the History of Children, Adolescents, and Youth—For the Past, Present, and Future", published in The Journal of American History (1999). In this influential essay, Graff explores the emergence of childhood and youth as subjects of historical inquiry, calling for greater interdisciplinary collaboration across history, sociology, education, and cultural studies. He argues for moving beyond sentimental or developmental narratives and toward historically grounded analyses that center class, gender, race, and place.

His book Conflicting Paths: Growing Up in America (Harvard University Press, 1995), which received the Choice Outstanding Academic Book Award, remains a touchstone in the field. Graff also edited Growing Up in America: Historical Experiences (1987), one of the earliest collections to examine childhood across diverse American contexts. These and other works trace how cultural expectations and institutional structures have shaped the experiences of children and adolescents across time.

=== History of cities and urban history ===
Graff has played a role in the evolution of urban history, particularly within the broader frameworks of social, cultural, comparative, and interdisciplinary historiography.

Graff's urban scholarship reflects a commitment to studying cities as dynamic sites of social structure, inequality, identity, and historical memory.

His early urban work includes Dallas, Texas: A Guide to the Sources of Its Social History (1981), co-authored with doctoral students Alan Baron and Charles Barton, which was among the first efforts to document the social historical record of a modern American city using interdisciplinary research methods.

Graff’s most well-known urban study is The Dallas Myth: The Making and Unmaking of an American City (University of Minnesota Press, 2008). A critical and innovative history, the book challenges boosterist narratives and popular myths about Dallas, revealing the constructed nature of civic identity and historical memory. It is also a reflective experiment in urban historiography, combining empirical research with first-person commentary, placing Graff both as historian and urban subject.

In such book as Looking Backward and Looking Forward: Perspectives on Social Science History (co-edited with Leslie Page Moch and Philip McMichael, 2005), and in Undisciplining Knowledge: Interdisciplinarity in the Twentieth Century (2015), Graff situates urban history within a larger story of disciplinary transformation, arguing for historically informed, cross-disciplinary research to understand the complexities of urban life.

=== History of Interdisciplinarity, history of knowledge ===
Harvey J. Graff is widely recognized for his pioneering scholarship on interdisciplinarity and the intellectual history of academic knowledge.

His 2015 book, Undisciplining Knowledge: Interdisciplinarity in the Twentieth Century (Johns Hopkins University Press), is a landmark work that offers the first sustained, comparative, and critical history of interdisciplinary initiatives within the modern university.

=== Higher Education: History, Present, and Future ===
Graff critically engages with the history and contemporary challenges of universities in his recent and forthcoming works. His hybrid autobiography, My Life With Literacy: The Continuing Education of a Historian (2024), offers a reflective exploration of his personal and academic journey. In this work, Graff examines the interconnectedness of his personal experiences, political influences, academic scholarship, and the cities where he lived and worked. He describes the book as a “new intersectionality,” highlighting the complex interplay of these factors throughout his life and career. In addition to his autobiography, Graff has completed several projects that address academic change, student experiences, and institutional transformation. Reconstructing the "Uni-versity": From the Ashes of the "Mega- and Multi-versity" to the Futures of Higher Education is published by Bloomsbury Academic in 2025. In August 2025, Graff published Changing Paths of Academic Lives: Revising How We Understand Higher Education, 1960s to 2020s and Beyond (WAC Clearinghouse Publications and University Press of Colorado), a collection of original essays for which he served as editor and wrote the introduction.

== Books ==
=== The Literacy Myth ===
Written in 1979, this book critically reviews 19th century thought that supports the "literacy myth", as Graff calls it, which is the assumption that literacy by itself translates to economic, social, and cultural success. His research contradicts this, suggesting “that connections between schooling and social mobility are not natural ones". He argues that reality contradicts assumptions correlating literacy and success.

=== The Legacies of Literacy: Continuities and Contradictions in Western Society and Culture ===
Graff's early scholarship on literacy culminated in The Legacies of Literacy: Continuities and Contradictions in Western Society and Culture (1987), a general historical analysis that examines the development and meanings of literacy in Western societies over time. Drawing on interdisciplinary sources, the book argues that literacy has been frequently misunderstood as a universally beneficial force, while in reality it has played contradictory roles in different social contexts. The project was funded by the American Council of Learned Societies, the National Endowment for the Humanities, the Spencer Foundation, the Newberry Library, and the University of Texas.

=== Conflicting Paths: Growing Up in America ===
The assumption has been made by scholars and the general populace alike “that children have followed in the paths marked out for them by adults, and the possibility that they developed their own reactions and behavior in the course of their maturation has been ignored”. Basically, while social scientists are familiar with normative behavior, little is known about the actual behavior of children as they mature. Conflicting Paths looks at over five-hundred personal narratives dating from 1750 to 1920 to follow the actual process of growing up in America and, if it has, how it has changed over time as well as the effects of factors such as class, gender and ethnicity.

=== The Dallas Myth: The Making and Unmaking of an American City ===
In The Dallas Myth: The Making and Unmaking of an American City (2008), Graff offers a critical examination of Dallas, Texas, challenging the dominant narratives promoted by local elites. The book analyzes the concept of the “Dallas Way,” a governing ideology that Graff argues limits democratic engagement and reinforces social inequality. Through historical investigation, Graff deconstructs the myth of Dallas as a “city with no past” and scrutinizes how urban planning, racial politics, and civic culture have shaped the city's development.

=== Undisciplining Knowledge: Interdisciplinarity in the Twentieth Century ===
Published by Johns Hopkins University Press in 2015, this book argues that Interdisciplinarity or the interrelationships among distinct fields, disciplines, or branches of knowledge in pursuit of new answers to pressing problems is one of the most contested topics in higher education today. Some see it as a way to break down the silos of academic departments and foster creative interchange, while others view it as a destructive force that will diminish academic quality and destroy the university as we know it. Graff presents readers with the first comparative and critical history of interdisciplinary initiatives in the modern university. Organized chronologically, the book tells the engaging stories of how various academic fields both embraced and fought off efforts to share knowledge with other scholars. It is a story of myths, exaggerations, and misunderstandings, on all sides.

=== Searching for Literacy: The Social and Intellectual Origins of Literacy Studies ===
Searching for Literacy: The Social and Intellectual Origins of Literacy Studies (2022) provides a critical account of the evolution of literacy studies across disciplines. The book traces how foundational concepts and methodologies have developed over time and critiques prevailing approaches, including those associated with the New Literacy Studies.

=== My Life With Literacy: The Continuing Education of a Historian ===
In his hybrid autobiography My Life With Literacy: The Continuing Education of a Historian (2024), Graff reflects on the intersections between his personal and professional life in their historical contexts. Structured around the themes of literacy, politics, academic life, and urban experience, the book recounts his development as a historian and interdisciplinary scholar. Graff examines his scholarly trajectory within broader social and historical contexts, emphasizing how his lived experiences across cities and universities shaped his academic contributions.

=== Reconstructing the “Uni-versity”: From the Ashes of the “Mega- and Multi-versity” to the Futures of Higher Education ===
Graff’s 2025 book, Reconstructing the “Uni-versity”: From the Ashes of the “Mega- and Multi-versity” to the Futures of Higher Education published by Bloomsbury Academic, critiques prevailing narratives about the decline of higher education.

== Awards ==
Graff has also received awards from the American Antiquarian Society, American Council of Learned Societies, Central Mortgage and Housing Corporation, National Endowment for the Humanities, National Science Foundation, The Newberry Library, Spencer Foundation, Swedish Institute, Texas Committee for the Humanities, and the Woodrow Wilson Foundation.

In 2001, he was awarded the honorary Doctor of Philosophy by the University of Linköping in Sweden for his scholarly contributions.

In 2013, he received the first SSHA Special Award recognizing his continuous participation from 1976 through 2013.

In 2023, Graff was elected a full member of the American Antiquarian Society. He has been nominated to several academic bodies, including the American Academy of Arts and Sciences, the American Philosophical Society, and the National Academy of Education. In retirement, Graff remains active in both scholarly and public discourse.

== Selected publications ==
- Graff, Harvey J. (1979). The literacy myth: literacy and social structure in the nineteenth-century city. Studies in social discontinuity. New York: Academic Press. ISBN 978-0-12-294520-5.
- Graff, Harvey J. (1981). Literacy in history: an interdisciplinary research bibliography. Garland reference library of the humanities. New York: Garland Pub. ISBN 978-0-8240-9460-7.
- Graff, Harvey J., ed. (1981). Literacy and social development in the West: a reader. Cambridge studies in oral and literate culture. Cambridge: Cambridge Univ. Press. ISBN 978-0-521-23954-7.
- Graff, Harvey J. (1995-09-14). The Labyrinths Of Literacy. University of Pittsburgh Press. doi:10.2307/j.ctvthhc29. ISBN 978-0-8229-7941-8.
- Graff, Harvey (1987). The Legacies of Literacy. Indiana University Press. doi:10.2979/2194.0. ISBN 978-0-253-14733-2.
- Graff, Harvey J. (September 15, 1997). Conflicting Paths: Growing Up in America. Harvard University Press. p. 442. ISBN 978-0674160675.
- Graff, Harvey J. (2007). Literacy and historical development: a reader. Carbondale: Southern Illinois university press. ISBN 978-0-8093-2782-9.
- Graff, Harvey J. (2008). The Dallas myth: the making and unmaking of an American city. Minneapolis: University of Minnesota Press. ISBN 978-0-8166-5269-3.
- Graff, Harvey J. (2011). Literacy myths, legacies, & lessons: new studies on literacy. New Brunswick (N.J.): Transaction publ. ISBN 978-1-4128-1475-1.
- Graff, Harvey J. (2017). Undisciplining Knowledge. Johns Hopkins University Press. ISBN 978-1-4214-1745-5.
- Graff, Harvey J. (2022). Searching for Literacy: The Social and Intellectual Origins of Literacy Studies (1st ed.). Cham: Springer International Publishing AG. ISBN 978-3-030-96980-6.
- "The Literacy Myth: Cultural Integration and Social Structure in the Nineteenth Century - The WAC Clearinghouse". wac.colostate.edu.
- Graff, Harvey J. (2024-08-27). My Life With Literacy: The Continuing Education of a Historian. The WAC Clearinghouse; University Press of Colorado. doi:10.37514/pra-b.2024.1312. ISBN 978-1-64215-131-2.
- Graff, Harvey J (2025). Reconstructing the "Uni-versity" From the Ashes of the "Mega- and Multi-versity" to the Futures of Higher Education. Bloomsbury Publishing. p. 384. ISBN 9781978763388.
