= Bibliography of the history of education in the United States =

A bibliography of the history of education in the United States comprises tens of thousands of books, articles and dissertations. This is an abridged guide to some notable studies.

The history of education in the United States, or foundations of education, covers the trends in educational philosophy, policy, institutions, as well as formal and informal learning in America from the 17th century to today.

== Surveys ==
- Button, H. Warren and Provenzo, Eugene F., Jr. History of Education and Culture in America. Prentice-Hall, 1983. 379 pp.
- Cremin, Lawrence A. The transformation of the school: Progressivism in American education, 1876–1957. (1961).
- Cremin, Lawrence A. American Education: The Colonial Experience, 1607–1783. (1970); American Education: The National Experience, 1783–1876. (1980); American Education: The Metropolitan Experience, 1876-1980 (1990); standard 3 vol covering all forms of American culture; only a fraction deals with schools
- Cubberley, E.P. (1922). "Education in the United States". In Foster Watson (ed.). Encyclopaedia and Dictionary of Education. Vol. 4. London: Sir Isaac Pitman & Sons, Ltd. pp. 1703–1709 – via Google Books.
- Curti, M. E. The social ideas of American educators, with new chapter on the last twenty-five years. (1934, 1959).
- Dexter, Edwin Grant (1904). History of Education in the United States. New York: Macmillan – via HathiTrust.
- Goldstein, Dana. The Teacher Wars: A History of America's Most Embattled Profession (2014)
- Herbst, Juergen. The once and future school: Three hundred and fifty years of American secondary education. (1996).
- Herbst, Juergen. School Choice and School Governance: A Historical Study of the United States and Germany 2006. ISBN 1-4039-7302-4.
- Lucas, C. J. American higher education: A history. (1994). pp.; reprinted essays from History of Education Quarterly
- Monroe, Paul (ed.), A Cyclopedia of Education, New York: Macmillan – via HathiTrust (1911-1913). 5 vols: v.1: A-Chrysos (1911); v.2: Church-Fusion; v.4: Liberal-Polyhedron (1913); v.5: Poly-Z + "Analytical indexes"
- Parkerson Donald H., and Jo Ann Parkerson. Transitions in American education: a social history of teaching (2001) online
- Parkerson, Donald H. and Parkerson, Jo Ann. The Emergence of the Common School in the U.S. Countryside. Edwin Mellen, 1998. 192 pp.
- Peterson, Paul. Saving Schools: From Horace Mann to Virtual Learning (2010), theorists from Mann to the present
- Reese, William J. America's Public Schools: From the Common School to No Child Left Behind Johns Hopkins U. Press, 2005. online
- Rury; John L. Education and Social Change: Themes in the History of American Schooling. Lawrence Erlbaum Associates. 2002. online version
- Thelin, John R. A History of American Higher Education. Johns Hopkins U. Press, 2004. 421 pp. online
- Tyack, David B. The One Best System: A History of American Urban Education (1974),
- Tyack, David B., and Elizabeth Hansot. Managers of Virtue: Public School Leadership in America, 1820–1980. (1982).
- Zimmerman, Jonathan Small Wonder: The Little Red Schoolhouse in History and Memory Yale U. Press (2014).

== Pre 1880 ==
- Addis, Cameron. Jefferson's Vision for Education: 1760-1845. Lang, 2003. 255 pp.
- Allmendinger, Jr., David F. Paupers and Scholars: The Transformation of Student Life in Nineteenth-Century New England 1975
- Axtell, James. The school upon a hill: Education and society in colonial New England. Yale University Press. (1974).
- Bernard Bailyn. Education in the Forming of American Society (U of North Carolina Press, 1960), colonial era
- Brown, Richard D. The strength of a people: The idea of an informed citizenry in America, 1650–1870 (U of North Carolina Press, 1996)
- Cohen, Patricia. A calculating people: The spread of numeracy in early America (U of Chicago Press, 1982)
- Cousins, James P. Horace Holley: Transylvania University and the Making of Liberal Education in the Early American Republic. University Press of Kentucky. (2016).
- Cremin, Lawrence A. American Education: The Colonial Experience, 1607–1783. (1970); American Education: The National Experience, 1783–1876. (1980) vol 1 online
- Cross, Barbara M. Horace Bushnell: minister to a changing America (1958) online
- Gilmore-Lehne, W J. Reading becomes a necessity of life: Material and cultural life in rural New England, 1780–1835 (U of Tennessee Press, 1989).
- Graham, Patricia Albjerg. Community & Class in American Education, 1865-1918 1974
- Hazard, Paul (2013) [1935]. The Crisis of the European Mind: 1680–1715. Translated by May, James Lewis. New York: New York Review Books. ISBN 978-1590176191.
- Kaestle, Carl F. The Evolution of an Urban School System: New York City, 1750-1850. Harvard University Press, 1974
- Kaestle, Carl F. Pillars of the Republic: Common Schools and American Society, 1780–1860. 1983. 266 pp.
- Katz, Michael. The Irony of Early School Reform Harvard University Press, 1968, on Massachusetts
- McAfee, Ward F. Religion, Race, and Reconstruction: The Public School in the Politics of the 1870s. State U. of New York Press, 1998. 320 pp.
- Mattingly, Paul H. The Classless Profession: American Schoolmen in the Nineteenth Century 1975
- Messerli, Jonathan. Horace Mann: A Biography 1972
- Parkerson, Donald H. and Parkerson, Jo Ann. The Emergence of the Common School in the U.S. Countryside. Edwin Mellen, 1998. 192 pp.
- Reese, William J. The Origins of the American High School. New Haven: Yale University Press, 1995.
- Robson, David W. Educating Republicans: The College in the Era of the American Revolution, 1750-1800. Greenwood, 1985. 272 pp.
- Taylor, Bob Pepperman. Horace Mann's Troubling Legacy: The Education of Democratic Citizens (University Press of Kansas; 2010) 192 pages. Argues that Mann's view of civic education marginalized the role of schools in training the intellect; links him to anti-intellectualism in American education.
- Troen, Selwyn K. "Popular Education in Nineteenth Century St. Louis" History of Education Quarterly 13#1 (1973), pp. 23–40 in JSTOR
- Troen, Selwyn K. The public and the schools: Shaping the St. Louis system, 1838-1920 (University of Missouri Press, 1975).
- Welter, Rush, Popular Education and Democratic Thought in America (Columbia University Press, 1962)

== Since 1880 ==
- Berube; Maurice R. American School Reform: Progressive, Equity, and Excellence Movements, 1883-1993. 1994. online version
- Brint, S., & Karabel, J. The Diverted Dream: Community colleges and the promise of educational opportunity in America, 1900–1985. Oxford University Press. (1989).
- Cremin, Lawrence A. The Transformation of the School: Progressivism in American Education, 1876–1957. (1961).
- Cremin, Lawrence A. American Education: The Metropolitan Experience, 1876-1980 (1990); vol 3 of standard detailed scholarly history
- Dorn, Sherman. Creating the Dropout: An Institutional and Social History of School Failure. Praeger, 1996. 167 pp.
- Drury, Darrel, and Justin Baer. The American Public School Teacher: Past, Present, and Future (Harvard Education Press; 2011) 326 pages; a portrait study of schoolteachers over the past half century that draws on surveys conducted by the National Education Association every five years.
- Fenske, Neil R. A History of American Public High Schools 1890-1990: Through the Eyes of Principals. Mellen, 1997. 230 pp.
- Knight, Edgar W.; Fifty Years of American Education: A Historical Review and Critical Appraisal (1952) online edition
- Krug, Edward A. The shaping of the American high school, 1880–1920. (1964); The American high school, 1920–1940. (1972). standard 2 vol scholarly history
- Ravitch, Diane. Left Back: A Century of Failed School Reforms. Simon & Schuster, 2000. 555 pp.
- Ravitch, Diane and Vinovskis, Maris A., ed. Learning from the Past: What History Teaches Us about School Reform. Johns Hopkins U. Pr., 1995. 381 pp.
- Troen, Selwyn K. "Popular Education in Nineteenth Century St. Louis" History of Education Quarterly 13#1 (1973), pp. 23–40 in JSTOR
- Troen, Selwyn K. The public and the schools: Shaping the St. Louis system, 1838-1920 (University of Missouri Press, 1975).
- Tyack, David B. The One Best System: A History of American Urban Education (1974),
- Tyack, David and Cuban, Larry. Tinkering Toward Utopia: A Century of Public School Reform. Harvard U. Pr., 1995. 184 pp.
- Tyack, David B., & Hansot, E. Managers of virtue: Public school leadership in America, 1820–1980. (1982).
- Tyack, David; Lowe, Robert; Hansot, Elisabeth. Public Schools in Hard Times: The Great Depression and Recent Years. Harvard U. Press, 1984. 267 pp.
- Zilversmit, Arthur. Changing Schools: Progressive Education Theory and Practice, 1930-1960. U. of Chicago Press, 1993. 251 pp.

=== Recent ===
- Chubb, John E. and Terry M. Moe. Politics, Markets and America's Schools (1990)
- Kosar, Kevin R. Failing Grades: The Federal Politics of Education Standards. Rienner, 2005. 259 pp.
- E. Wayne Ross et al. eds. Defending Public Schools. (Praeger, 2004), 4 vol: Volume: 1: Education Under the Security State (2004); Volume: 2: Teaching for a Democratic Society in the UnitedSatesofAmerica (2004); Volume: 3: Curriculum Continuity and Change in the 21st Century (2004); Volume: 4: The Nature and Limits of Standards-Based Reform and Assessment (2004).
- Tyack, David. Seeking Common Grounds: Public Schools in a Diverse Society. (Harvard UP, 2003). 237 pp.

== Race ==
- Alexander, Roberta Sue. "Hostility and hope: Black education in North Carolina during presidential Reconstruction, 1865-1867." North Carolina Historical Review 53.2 (1976): 113–132. online
- Allen, Quaylan, and Kimberly White-Smith. "“That’s why I say stay in school”: Black mothers’ parental involvement, cultural wealth, and exclusion in their son's schooling." Urban Education 53.3 (2018): 409-435. online
- Allen, Walter R. Joseph O. Jewell; "African American Education since 'An American Dilemma'" Daedalus, Vol. 124, 1995
- Allen, Walter R., et al. "From Bakke to Fisher: African American Students in US Higher Education over Forty Years." RSF: The Russell Sage Foundation Journal of the Social Sciences 4.6 (2018): 41–72. online
- Anderson, James D. "Northern foundations and the shaping of southern black rural education, 1902–1935." History of Education Quarterly 18.4 (1978): 371–396. online
- Anderson; James D. The Education of Blacks in the South, 1860–1935 (University of North Carolina Press, 1988). The standard scholarly study.
- Baker, Liva. The Second Battle of New Orleans: The Hundred-Year Struggle to Integrate the Schools. HarperCollins, 1996. 564 pp.
- Belt-Beyan; Phyllis M. The Emergence of African American Literacy Traditions: Family and Community Efforts in the Nineteenth Century. Praeger. 2004.
- Bond Horace M. Negro Education in Alabama: A Study in Cotton and Steel. (1939). online
- Bullock Henry Allen. A History of Negro Education in the South from 1619 to the Present. (1967) online
- Bureau of Education, Negro Education: A Study of the Private and Higher Schools for Colored People in the United States, Volume II Bulletin, 1916, No. 39 abstract and also full text online comprehensive coverage of each state.
- Burton, Vernon. "Race and Reconstruction: Edgefield County, South Carolina." Journal of Social History (1978): 31–56. online
- Butchart, Ronald E. "Black hope, white power: emancipation, reconstruction and the legacy of unequal schooling in the US South, 1861–1880." Paedagogica historica 46.1-2 (2010): 33–50.
- Butchart, Ronald E. Northern schools, southern Blacks, and Reconstruction: Freedmen's education, 1862-1875 (Praeger, 1980).
- Butler Addie L. J. The Distinctive Black College: Talladega, Tuskegee, and Morehouse. Scarecrow Press, 1977.
- Carney, Cary Michael. Native American Higher Education in the United States. Transaction, 1999. 193 pp.
- Coats, Linda T. "The Way We Learned: African American Students' Memories of Schooling in the Segregated South." Journal of Negro Education 79.1 (2010). online
- Cooper, Arnold. Between Struggle and Hope: Four Black Educators in the South, 1894-1915. Iowa State U. Press, 1989. 121 pp.
- Crouch, Barry A. "Black Education in Civil War and Reconstruction Louisiana: George T. Ruby, the Army, and the Freedmen's Bureau." Louisiana History 38.3 (1997): 287–308. online
- Davis, Alicia, and Greg Wiggan. "Black Education and the Great Migration." Black History Bulletin 81.2 (2018): 12–16. [ online]
- Denton, Virginia Lantz. Booker T. Washington and the Adult Education Movement. U Press of Florida. 1993.
- Fairclough, Adam. "The costs of Brown: Black teachers and school integration." Journal of American History 91.1 (2004): 43–55. online
- Gardner. Booker T. "The Educational Contributions of Booker T. Washington." Journal of Negro Education. 14 (Fall 1975): 502–18. online
- Gasman, Marybeth and Roger L. Geiger. Higher Education for African Americans before the Civil Rights Era, 1900-1964 (2012)
- Giddings, Paula. In Search of Sisterhood: Delta Sigma Theta and the Challenge of the Black Sorority Movement. Morrow, 1988. 336 pp.
- Hardin, John A. Fifty Years of Segregation: Black Higher Education in Kentucky, 1904-1954. U. Press of Kentucky, 1997. 182 pp.
- Harlan Louis R. Booker T. Washington: The Wizard of Tuskegee, 1901-1915. 1983.
- Harlan, Louis R. "Desegregation in New Orleans public schools during reconstruction." American Historical Review 67.3 (1962): 663–675. online
- Horsford, Sonya Douglass. "Black superintendents on educating Black students in separate and unequal contexts." The Urban Review 42.1 (2010): 58–79. online
- Ihle, Elizabeth L., ed. Black Women in Higher Education: An Anthology of Essays, Studies, and Documents. Garland, 1992. 341 pp.
- Jewell, Joseph O. Race, Social Reform and the Making of a Middle Class: The American Missionary Association and Black Atlanta, 1870-1900. Rowman & Littlefield. 2007.
- Kelly, Hilton. "What Jim Crow’s teachers could do: Educational capital and teachers’ work in under-resourced schools." The Urban Review 42.4 (2010): 329-350. online
- Lewis, Ronald, and Phyllis M. Belt-Beyan. The Emergence of African American Literacy Traditions: Family and Community Efforts in the Nineteenth Century (2004)
- Lovett, Bobby L. America's Historically Black Colleges and Universities: A Narrative History, 1837-2009 (Mercer University Press; 2011) 390 pages
- McMurry Linda O. George Washington Carver: Scientist and Symbol, 1864-1943. Oxford University Press, 1981.
- Moneyhon, Carl H. "Public Education and Texas Reconstruction Politics, 1871-1874." Southwestern Historical Quarterly 92.3 (1989): 393–416. online
- Morris Robert C. Reading, 'Riting, and Reconstruction: The Education of Freedmen in the South, 1861-1870. U of Chicago Press, 1981.
- Myrdal, Gunnar. An American Dilemma: The Negro Problem and Modern Democracy. 2 vols. 1944. esp for 1930s and early 1940s
- Podair, Jerald E. The Strike That Changed New York: Blacks, Whites, and the Ocean Hill-Brownsville Crisis. Yale U. Press, 2002. 273 pp.
- Raffel, Jeffrey. Historical dictionary of school segregation and desegregation: The American experience (Bloomsbury, 1998) online
- Rosen, F. Bruce. "The influence of the Peabody Fund on education in Reconstruction Florida." Florida Historical Quarterly 55.3 (1977): 310–320. online
- Schall, Keith L. ed. Stoney the Road: Chapters in the History of Hampton Institute U of Virginia Press, 1977.
- Shabazz, Amilcar. Advancing Democracy: African Americans and the Struggle for Access and Equity in Higher Education in Texas. U. of North Carolina Press., 2004. 301 pp. online review
- Span, Christopher M. From Cotton Field to Schoolhouse: African American Education in Mississippi, 1862-1875 (2009)
- Taylor, Kay Ann. "Mary S. Peake and Charlotte L. Forten: Black teachers during the Civil War and Reconstruction." Journal of Negro Education (2005): 124–137. online
- Tyack, David, and Robert Lowe. "The constitutional moment: Reconstruction and Black education in the South." American Journal of Education 94.2 (1986): 236–256. online

== Ethnicity, religion ==
- Brumberg, Stephan F. Going to America, Going to School: The Jewish Immigrant Public School Encounter in Turn-of-the-Century New York City. Praeger, 1986. 282 pp.
- Gleason, Philip. Contending with Modernity: Catholic Higher Education in the Twentieth Century. Oxford U. Press, 1995. 434 pp.
- Justice, Benjamin. The War That Wasn't: Religious Conflict and Compromise in the Common Schools of New York State, 1865-1900. State U. of New York Press, 2005. 285 pp.
- Leahy, William P. Adapting to America: Catholics, Jesuits, and Higher Education in the Twentieth Century. Georgetown U. Press, 1991. 187 pp.
- MacDonald, Victoria-Maria. Latino Education in the United States: A Narrated History from 1513-2000 (2004)
- Ringenberg, William C. The Christian College: A History of Protestant Higher Education in America. Eerdmans for Christian U. Pr., 1984. 257 pp.
- Rosovsky, Nitza. The Jewish Experience at Harvard and Radcliffe. Harvard U. Press, 1986. 108 pp.
- Sanders, James W The education of an urban minority: Catholics in Chicago, 1833–1965. (1977).
- Solberg, Richard W. Lutheran Higher Education in North America. Augsburg, 1985. 352 pp.
- Walch, Timothy. Parish School: American Catholic Parochial Education from Colonial Times to the Present. 1996.

== Gender ==
- Bordin, Ruth. Alice Freeman Palmer: The Evolution of a New Woman. U. of Michigan Press, 1993.
- Clifford, Geraldine J. Those Good Gertrudes: A Social History of Women Teachers in America. Baltimore, MD: Johns Hopkins University Press, 2014.
- Clinton, Catherine, and Christine Lunardini, eds. The Columbia guide to American women in the Nineteenth Century (NY: Columbia UP, 2000), on education go to pp 38–52 and 243–245. online
- Conway, Jill K. The female experience in eighteenth- and nineteenth-century America: a guide to the history of American women (Princeton: 1985) pp. 81–94; online
- Cross, Barbara, ed. The Educated Woman in America. Selected Writings of Catherine Beecher, Margaret Fuller and M. Carey Thomas (1965), primary sources. online
- Eisenmann, Linda ed. Historical Dictionary of Women's Education in the United States. 1998.
- Eisenmann, Linda. Higher Education for Women in Postwar America, 1945-1965. Baltimore, MD: Johns Hopkins University Press, 2006.
- Eschbach, Elizabeth Seymour. The Higher Education of Women in England and America, 1865-1920. New York: Garland, 1993.
- Farnham, Christie Anne. The Education of the Southern Belle: Higher Education and Student Socialization in the Antebellum South. New York University Press, 1994.
- Faragher, John Mack and Howe, Florence, ed. Women and Higher Education in American History. New York: W.W. Norton, 1988.
- Gordon, Lynn D. Gender and Higher Education in the Progressive Era. New Haven, CT: Yale University Press, 1990.
- Holland, Dorothy and Eisenhart, Margaret. Educated in Romance: Women, Achievement, and College Culture. Chicago: University of Chicago Press, 1990.
- Ihle, Elizabeth L., ed. Black Women in Higher Education: An Anthology of Essays, Studies, and Documents. New York: Garland, 1992; includes primary sources.
- Kraditor, Aileen S. Up from the pedestal: Selected writings in the history of American feminism (1968), primary sources on education, pp. 79–107. online
- Mayo A. D. Southern Women in the Recent Educational Movement in the South. 1892.
- McCandless, Amy Thompson. The Past in the Present: Women's Higher Education in the Twentieth-Century American South. University of Alabama Press, 1999.
- Menk, Patricia H. To Live in Time: The Sesquicentennial History of Mary Baldwin College. Verona, Va.: Mid Valley, 1992.
- Nash, Margaret A. Women's Education in the United States, 1780-1840 2005.
- Nidiffer, Jana. Pioneering Deans of Women: More Than Wise and Pious Matrons. Teachers College Press, 2000.
- Rossiter, Margaret W. "Doctorates for American Women, 1868-1907". History of Education Quarterly 22#2 (Summer): 159–183.
- Rossiter, Margaret W. Women Scientists in America: Before Affirmative Action, 1940-1972. Baltimore, MD: Johns Hopkins University Press, 1995.
- Sadovnik, Alan R. and Semel, Susan F., ed. Founding Mothers and Others: Women Educational Leaders during the Progressive Era. Palgrave Macmillan, 2002.
- Solomon, Barbara M. In the company of educated women: A history of women and higher education in America. (1985).
- Woody, Thomas. A history of women's education in the United States (2 vol 1929), an older major scholarly history. vol 1 online; see also vol 2 online
- Wyman, Andrea. Rural women teachers in the United States (1997) online

== Economic and social history ==
- Brown, Richard D. "Modernization and the Modem Personality in Early America, 1600-1865: A Sketch of a Synthesis," Journal of Interdisciplinary History, 2 (1971–72): 201–228, what education accomplished in JSTOR
- Goldin, Claudia. "America's graduation from high school: The evolution and spread of secondary schooling in the twentieth century." Journal of Economic History, (1998). 58 (2), 345–374. in JSTOR
- Goldin, Claudia. "The Human-Capital Century and American Leadership: Virtues of the Past", Journal of Economic History, (2001) vol. 61#2 pp 263–90 online
- Goldin, Claudia, and Lawrence F. Katz. The Race between Education and Technology (2008) excerpt and text search
- Jensen, Richard J., and Mark Friedberger. Education and Social Structure: An Historical Study of Iowa, 1870-1930 (Chicago: The Newberry Library, 1976) online
- Kaelble, Hartmut. Social Mobility in the Nineteenth and Twentieth Centuries: Europe and America in Comparative Perspective. St. Martin's, 1986. 183 pp.
- McClellan, B. Edward and Reese, William J., ed. The Social History of American Education. U. of Illinois Pr., 1988. 370 pp.; reprinted essays from History of Education Quarterly
- Nasaw, David. Schooled to Order: A Social History of Public Schooling in the United States (1981)
- Rury, John L. Education and Social Change: Themes in the History of American Schooling. Lawrence Erlbaum Associates. 2002.

== Regional and local studies ==
- Cohen, Ronald D. Children of the Mill: Schooling and Society in Gary, Indiana, 1906-1960. Indiana U. Press, 1990. 280 pp.
- Dotts, Cecil K. and Sikkema, Mildred. Challenging the Status Quo: Public Education in Hawaii, 1840-1980. Honolulu: Hawaii Educ. Assoc., 1994. 285 pp.
- Fuller, Wayne E. The Old Country School: The Story of Rural Education in the Middle West (1982).
- Lazerson, Marvin; Origins of the Urban School: Public Education in Massachusetts, 1870-1915 Harvard University Press, 1971
- Mirel, Jeffrey. The Rise and Fall of an Urban School System: Detroit, 1907-81. U. of Michigan Press, 1993. 456 pp.
- Nelson, Bryce E. Good Schools: The Seattle Public School System, 1901-1930. (U. of Washington Press, 1988). 187 pp.
- Peterson, Paul E. The Politics of School Reform, 1870-1940. (1985). 241 pp. on Chicago
- Raftery, Judith Rosenberg. Land of Fair Promise: Politics and Reform in Los Angeles Schools, 1885-1941. (1992). 284 pp.
- Rury, John L. and Cassell, Frank A., eds. Seeds of Crisis: Public Schooling in Milwaukee since 1920. (1993). 318 pp.
- Theobald, Paul. Call School: Rural Education in the Midwest to 1918. (1995). 246 pp.
- Troen, Selwyn K.; The Public and the Schools: Shaping the St. Louis System, 1838-1920 (1975)

=== South ===
- Ambler Charles H. A History of Education in West Virginia from Early Colonial Times to 1949. (1951).
- Anderson, James D. The education of Blacks in the South, 1860-1935 (1988).
- DeVore, Donald E. and Logsdon, Joseph. Crescent City Schools: Public Education in New Orleans, 1841-1991. Lafayette: Center for Louisiana Studies, 1991. 402 pp.
- Godbold, Albea. The Church College of the Old South (1944).
- Harvey, Gordon E. A Question of Justice: New South Governors and Education, 1968–1976 (2002) online review.
- Heatwole, Cornelius J. A history of education in Virginia (1916) online.
- Knight; Edgar W. Education in the South (1924) online edition
- Knight, Edgar Wallace, ed. A Documentary History of Education in the South Before 1860 (5 vol 1949) vol 1: European inheritances; primary sources
- Leloudis, J. L. Schooling the New South: Pedagogy, self, and society in North Carolina, 1880–1920. (1996). online version
- Link, William A. A hard country and a lonely place : schooling, society, and reform in rural Virginia, 1870-1920 (1986) online
- McCandless, Amy Thompson. "Progressivism and the higher education of southern Women." North Carolina Historical Review 70.3 (1993): 302–325. in JSTOR
- Mohr, Clarence L. ed. The New Encyclopedia of Southern Culture: Education (2011) online review; comprehensive coverage in 135 articles by 100+ scholars
- Mohr, Clarence L. "Review: Schooling, Modernization, and Race: The Continuing Dilemma of the American South" American Journal of Education 106#3 (1998) pp 439–50 in JSTOR
- Mohr, Clarence L. "Minds of the New South: Higher Education in Black and White, 1880-1915 " Southern Quarterly 46#4 (2009): 8-34 online
- O'Brien, Thomas V. The Politics of Race and Schooling: Public Education in Georgia, 1900-1961. (1999). 229 pp.
- Rushing, Wanda. "'Sin, Sex, and Segregation': Social control and the education of Southern women." Gender and education 14.2 (2002): 167–179.
- Williams, Timothy Intellectual Manhood: University, Self, and Society in the Antebellum South (2015) online review

== Higher education ==
=== Surveys ===
- Bogue, E. Grady and Aper, Jeffrey. Exploring the Heritage of American Higher Education: The Evolution of Philosophy and Policy. Oryx, 2000. 272 pp.
- Brint, S., & Karabel, J. The Diverted Dream: Community colleges and the promise of educational opportunity in America, 1900–1985. Oxford University Press. (1989).
- Carney, Cary Michael. Native American Higher Education in the United States. Transaction, 1999. 193 pp.
- Cohen, Arthur M. (1998). The Shaping of American Higher Education: Emergence and Growth of the Contemporary System. San Francisco: Jossey-Bass.
- Cremin, Lawrence A. American Education: The Colonial Experience, 1607–1783. (1970); American Education: The National Experience, 1783–1876. (1980); American Education: The Metropolitan Experience, 1876-1980 (1990); standard 3 vol detailed scholarly history
- Eisenmann, Linda. Higher Education for Women in Postwar America, 1945-1965. Johns Hopkins U. Press, 2006. 304 pp.
- Faragher, John Mack and Howe, Florence, ed. Women and Higher Education in American History. Norton, 1988. 220 pp.
- Frye, John H. The Vision of the Public Junior College, 1900-1940: Professional Goals and Popular Aspirations. Greenwood, 1992. 163 pp.
- Geiger, Roger L., ed. The American College in the Nineteenth Century. Vanderbilt University Press. (2000). online review
- Geiger, Roger L. To Advance Knowledge: The Growth of American Research Universities, 1900-1940. Oxford University Press. (1986).
- Geiger, Roger L. Research and Relevant Knowledge: American Research Universities Since World War II. Oxford University Press. (2001).
- Geiger, Roger L. The History of American Higher Education: Learning and Culture from the Founding to World War II (Princeton UP 2014), 584pp; encyclopedic in scope
- Gleason, Philip. Contending with Modernity: Catholic Higher Education in the Twentieth Century. Oxford U. Press, 1995. 434 pp.
- Horowitz, Helen L. Campus life: Undergraduate cultures from the end of the eighteenth century to the present. (1987).
- Ihle, Elizabeth L., ed. Black Women in Higher Education: An Anthology of Essays, Studies, and Documents. Garland, 1992. 341 pp.
- Jarausch, Konrad H., ed. The Transformation of Higher Learning, 1860-1930. U. of Chicago Press, 1983. 375 pp.
- Kerr, Clark. The Great Transformation in Higher Education, 1960-1980. State U. of New York Press, 1991. 383 pp.
- Leahy, William P. Adapting to America: Catholics, Jesuits, and Higher Education in the Twentieth Century. Georgetown U. Press, 1991. 187 pp.
- Levine, D. O. The American college and the culture of aspiration, 1915–1940. (1986).
- Lewis, Lionel L. Marginal Worth: Teaching and the Academic Labor Market. Transaction, 1996. 162 pp.
- Lucas, C. J. American higher education: A history. (1994).
- Robson, David W. Educating Republicans: The College in the Era of the American Revolution, 1750-1800. Greenwood, 1985. 272 pp.
- Ruben, Julie. The Making of the Modern University: Intellectual Transformation and the Marginalization of Morality. University Of Chicago Press. (1996).
- Rudolph, Frederick. The American College and University: A History (1991), a standard survey
- Thelin, John R. A History of American Higher Education. Johns Hopkins U. Press, 2004. 421 pp.
- Veysey Lawrence R. The Emergence of the American University. (1965).

=== State and regional ===
- Dolan, Amy Wells, and John R. Thelin. "Southern Higher Education History: A Synthesis and New Directions for Research." in Higher Education: Handbook of Theory and Research (Springer Netherlands, 2012) pp. 409–451.
- Douglass, John Aubrey. The California Idea and American Higher Education: 1850 to the 1960 Master Plan. Stanford U. Press, 2000. 460 pp.
- Hoover, Herbert T.; Alexander, Ruth Ann; Peterson, Patricia M.; and Zimmerman, Larry J., eds. From Idea to Institution: Higher Education in South Dakota. U. of South Dakota Press, 1989. 238 pp.
- McCandless, Amy Thompson. The Past in the Present: Women's Higher Education in the Twentieth-Century American South. U. of Alabama Press, 1999. 400 pp.
- Sansing, David G. Making Haste Slowly: The Troubled History of Higher Education in Mississippi. U. Press of Mississippi, 1990. 309 pp.
- Shabazz, Amilcar. Advancing Democracy: African Americans and the Struggle for Access and Equity in Higher Education in Texas. U. of North Carolina Press., 2004. 301 pp. online review

==== Specific colleges and universities ====
- Ashmore, Harry S. Unseasonable Truths: The Life of Robert Maynard Hutchins. Little, Brown, 1989. 616 pp. at U of Chicago
- Dressel, Paul L. College to University: The Hannah Years at Michigan State, 1935-1969. Michigan State U. Publ., 1987. 442 pp.
- Karabel, Jerome. The Chosen: The Hidden History of Admission and Exclusion at Harvard, Yale, and Princeton. Houghton Mifflin, 2005. 711 pp.
- Link, William A. William Friday: Power, Purpose, and American Higher Education. U. of North Carolina Press, 1995. 494 pp. at U of North Carolina
- Potts, David B. Wesleyan University, 1831-1910: Collegiate Enterprise in New England. Yale U. Press, 1992. 383 pp.
- Trelease, Allen W. Making North Carolina Literate: The University of North Carolina at Greensboro, from Normal School to Metropolitan University. Carolina Academic, 2004. 659 pp.

== Curriculum ==
- Adams, Katherine H. A Group of Their Own: College Writing Courses and American Women Writers, 1880-1940. State U. of New York Press, 2001. 220 pp.
- Baker, Houston A., Jr. Black Studies, Rap, and the Academy. U. of Chicago Press, 1993. 110 pp.
- Casement, William. The Great Canon Controversy: The Battle of the Books in Higher Education. Transaction Books, 1996. 172 pp.
- Current, Richard Nelson. Phi Beta Kappa in American Life: The First Two Hundred Years. Oxford U. Press, 1990. 319 pp.
- Elsbree, Willard S. The American Teacher Evolution Of A Profession In A Democracy (1939) online
- Frost, Dan R. Thinking Confederates: Academia and the Idea of Progress in the New South. U. of Tennessee Press, 2000. 207 pp.
- Hart, D. G. The University Gets Religion: Religious Studies in American Higher Education. Johns Hopkins U. Pr., 1999. 321 pp.
- Hoeveler, J. David. Creating the American Mind: Intellect and Politics in the Colonial Colleges. Rowman & Littlefield, 2002. 381 pp.
- Hohendahl, Peter Uwe, ed. German Studies in the United States: A Historical Handbook. Modern Language Assoc. of Am., 2003. 750 pp.
- Hoffman, Leonore and Rosenfelt, Deborah, eds. Teaching Women's Literature from a Regional Perspective. Modern Language Assoc. of Am., 1982. 213 pp.
- Hunt, Thomas C. and Carper, James C., eds. Religious Higher Education in the United States. Garland, 1996. 635 pp.
- Kynell, Teresa C. Writing in a Milieu of Utility: The Move to Technical Communication in American Engineering Programs, 1850-1950 Ablex, 1996. 102 pp.
- Marsden, George M. The Soul of the American University: From Protestant Establishment to Established Nonbelief. Oxford U. Press, 1994. 462 pp.
- Newman, Mark. Agency of Change: One Hundred Years of the North Central Association of Colleges and Schools. Kirksville: Thomas Jefferson U. Press, 1996. 406 pp.
- Pease, Donald E. and Wiegman, Robyn, ed. The Futures of American Studies. Duke U. Press, 2002. 619 pp.
- Röhrs, Hermann. The Classical German Concept of the University and Its Influence on Higher Education in the United States. Peter Lang, 1995. 128 pp.
- Sloan, Douglas. Faith and Knowledge: Mainline Protestantism and American Higher Education. Westminster/Knox, 1994. 252 pp.
- Smith, Peter; The History of American Art Education: Learning about Art in American Schools Greenwood Press, (1996) online edition
- Wildes, Karl L. and Lindgren, Nilo A. A Century of Electrical Engineering and Computer Science at MIT, 1882-1982. MIT Press, 1985. 423 pp.
- Willis, George, Robert V. Bullough, and John T. Holton, eds. The American Curriculum: A Documentary History (1992)
- Winterer, Caroline. The Culture of Classicism: Ancient Greece and Rome in American Intellectual Life, 1780-1910. Johns Hopkins U. Press, 2002. 244 pp.

== Historiography ==
- Altenbaugh, Richard J. "Oral history, American teachers and a social history of schooling: An emerging agenda." Cambridge Journal of Education 27#3 (1997): 313–330.
- Best, John Hardin, ed. Historical inquiry in education: A research agenda (American Educational Research Association, 1983); The most comprehensive overview of the historiography of American education, with essays by 13 scholars.
- Cohen, Sol. "The history of the history of American education, 1900-1976: The uses of the past." Harvard Educational Review 46#3 (1976): 298–330.
- Cohen, Sol. Challenging orthodoxies: Toward a new cultural history of education (Peter Lang, 1999).
- Dougherty, Jack. "From anecdote to analysis: Oral interviews and new scholarship in educational history." Journal of American History 86#2 (1999): 712–723. in JSTOR
- Ellis, Jason. "Professor Bailyn, Meet Professor Baynton: The 'New Disability History' of Education." History of Education Quarterly 60:3 (2020), pp. 285-94; doi.org/10.1017/heq.2020.38
- Fallace, Thomas. "The (Anti-)Ideological Origins of Bernard Bailyn's Education in the Forming of American Society. " History of Education Quarterly 58:3 (2018), pp. 315-37; doi.org/10.1017/heq.2018.13
- Finkelstein, Barbara. "Education historians as mythmakers." Review of research in education 18 (1992): 255–297. in JSTOR
- Katz, Michael ed. Education in American History: Readings on the Social Issues Praeger Publishers, 1973
- Perko, F. Michael. "Religious schooling in America: an historiographic reflection." History of Education Quarterly 40#3 (2000), pp. 320–338 in JSTOR
- Ramsey, Paul J. "Histories taking root: the contexts and patterns of educational historiography during the twentieth century." American Educational History Journal 34#1/2 (2007): 347+.
- Ravitch, Diane. The Revisionists Revised: A Critique of the Radical Attack on the Schools (1978)
  - Ravitch, Diane. The Revisionists Revised: Studies in the Historiography of American Education: a Review (National Academy of Education, 1977) pp. 1–84; a shorter version
- Reese, William J. and John J. Rury, eds. Rethinking the History of American Education (2008) excerpt
- Santora, Ellen Durrigan. "Historiographic Perspectives of Context and Progress During a Half Century of Progressive Educational Reform." Education and Culture 16#.1 (2012): 2+ online
- Sloan, Douglas. "Historiography and the History of Education," in Fred Kerlinger, ed., Review of Research in Education, 1 (1973): 239–269.
- Urban, W. J. "Some historiographical problems in revisionist educational history," American Educational Research Journal 12#3 pp 337–350.

== Primary sources ==
- Barr, Richard H. "Expenditures and Revenues for Public Elementary and Secondary Education, 1970-71" (PDF). National Center for Education Statistics.
- Barr, Richard H. "Expenditures and Revenues for Public Elementary and Secondary Education, 1971-72" (PDF). National Center for Education Statistics.
- Bureau of Education, Negro Education: A Study of the Private and Higher Schools for Colored People in the United States, Volume II Bulletin, 1916, No. 39 abstract and also full text online
- Cohen, Sol, ed. Education in the United States: A Documentary History (5 vol, 1974). 3400 pages of primary sources
- Diener, Thomas. Growth of an American Invention: A Documentary History of the Junior and Community College Movement. Greenwood, 1986. 249 pp.
- Gertler, Diane B.; Barker, Linda A. "Statistics of Public and Nonpublic Elementary and Secondary Day Schools 1968-69" (PDF). U.S. Department of Health, Education, and Welfare.
- Hofstadter, Richard, and C. Dewitt Hardy, eds; The Development and Scope of Higher Education in the United States (1952) online edition
- Knight, Edgar W. and Clifton L. Hall, eds.; Readings in American Educational History (1951) online edition, very wide range of topics
- Rudolph, Frederick, ed. Essays on education in the early Republic (1965) online edition
