= A History of Negro Education in the South =

A History of Negro Education in the South: From 1619 to the Present is a 1967 non-fiction book by Henry Allen Bullock, published by Harvard University Press. In the United Kingdom it was published by Oxford University Press.

The book has 288 pages of content. Frederick M. Binder described the idea of chronicling the history of education of African-Americans from 1619-1967 in that length as "ambitious".

According to Joe M. Richardson of Florida State University, Bullock was trying to explain whether segregated education in the South had unwittingly, in the author's words, caused "the complete emancipation of the Negro American as a person". Richardson described the book as having an inaccurate title.

== Background ==
Sourcing included documents from the American Missionary Association and the Freedmen's Bureau. Richardson did not use the archives at Fisk University nor the National Archives content.

== Content ==
The book does not have much statistical information nor much information on description.

== Reception ==
It was awarded the Bancroft Prize in 1968.

Frederick M. Binder of City College of New York argued that due to shortcomings, while there is "some value", there are other works that he recommended over this one, and he stated "This is a book whose title promises more than it delivers." Binder criticized some "undocumented" statements where he has "doubts[...]regarding the accuracy".

Leedell W. Neyland of Florida A&M University stated that the book was made "with great profundity and consummate skill."

Richardson stated that it is "well written" and "well organized", and that it "adds little new information" about the subject of educating African-Americans.

Benjamin Quarles of Morgan State College praised the work for being "stimulating", stating that it would benefit readers in many fields.

George Shepperson of the University of Edinburgh concluded that the book "commands respect"; he criticized the book not having a bibliography and had other criticisms.

Allan H. Spear of the University of Minnesota wrote that the work "is ultimately disappointing" despite the importance of its subject material.

Harold N. Stinson of Stillman College stated that the book "has high historical value" and praised the book's "documentation of historical facts." According to Stinson, the book's analysis does not consider "the political, economic, and social conditions of the black man in the South after slavery." Stinson argued that the "sociological yearnings" should have been omitted.

== See also ==
- History of education in the United States: Bibliography
- The Education of Blacks in the South, 1860–1935
