= Preschool Education in America =

1995 book

- Author: Barbara Beatty
- Subject: History of education
- Publisher: Yale University Press
- Publication date: 1995
- Pages: 252

Preschool Education in America: The Culture of Young Children from the Colonial Era to the Present is a 1995 history of preschool education in the United States written by Barbara Beatty.

== Bibliography ==
- Brott, Armin (December 3, 1995). "Education (Rev. of Preschool Education in America)". The Washington Post. ISSN 0190-8286.
- Cuffaro, Harriet K. (August 7, 1996). "Preschool education in America (Book Review) (Undetermined)". Journal of Curriculum Studies. 28: 487–490. ISSN 0022-0272.
- Hawes, Joseph M. (February 1997). "Preschool education in America (Book Review) (Undetermined)". American Historical Review. 102: 163. doi:10.2307/2171370. ISSN 0002-8762. JSTOR 2171370. EBSCOhost 512951679.
- Hawes, Joseph M. (1997). "Review of Preschool Education in America: The Culture of Young Children from the Colonial Era to the Present". The American Historical Review. 102 (1): 163–164. doi:10.2307/2171370. ISSN 0002-8762. JSTOR 2171370.
- Spodek, Bernard (1996). "Review of Preschool Education in America: The Culture of Young Children from the Colonial Era to the Present". American Journal of Education. 104 (3): 253–256. doi:10.1086/444133. ISSN 0195-6744. JSTOR 1085646.
- Sugarman, Sally (February 1996). "Preschool education in America: the culture of young children from the colonial era to the present". Choice. 33 (6): 33–3431. doi:10.5860/CHOICE.33-3431 (inactive July 1, 2025). ISSN 0009-4978.
- Trethewey, Lynne (July 2002). "Review of Preschool Education in America". History of Education. 31 (4): 384–395. doi:10.1080/00467600210132413. ISSN 0046-760X. EBSCOhost 6998415.
- Vinovskis, Maris A. (1996). "Review of Preschool Education in America: The Culture of Young Children from the Colonial Era to the Present". The Journal of American History. 83 (2): 590–591. doi:10.2307/2944960. ISSN 0021-8723. JSTOR 2944960.
- Woyshner, Christine A. (1996). "Rev. of Preschool Education in America". Harvard Educational Review. 66: 675. doi:10.17763/haer.66.3.376431584421h648. ISSN 0017-8055 – via EBSCOhost.
- Wrigley, Julia (1996). "Review of Preschool Education in America: The Culture of Young Children from the Colonial Era to the Present". History of Education Quarterly. 36 (4): 515–517. doi:10.2307/369792. ISSN 0018-2680. JSTOR 369792.
