= David Tyack =

Historian of education

- Born: November 17, 1930; Beverly, Massachusetts, U.S.
- Died: October 27, 2016 (aged 85); Palo Alto, California, U.S.
- Education: Harvard University
- Occupation: Historian of education

David B. Tyack (November 17, 1930 – October 27, 2016) was the Vida Jacks Professor of Education and Professor of History, Emeritus at the Stanford Graduate School of Education. Tyack is known for his wide-ranging studies and interpretations of the history of American education.

Tyack took his undergraduate degree in 1952 and his PhD in 1958, both at Harvard University. His dissertation under Bernard Bailyn dealt with "Gentleman of letters: a study of George Ticknor". Tyack taught at Reed College from 1959 to 1966, the University of Illinois from 1967 to 1969, and since 1969 at Stanford University. He received awards from the American Council of Learned Societies, and the Center for Advanced Study in the Behavioral Sciences. Tyack served as president of the History of Education Society, 1970 to 1971.

Tyack examined late 19th century reform movements in New York City, Philadelphia, St. Louis, San Francisco and Chicago. He concluded that, "What the structural reformers wanted to do, then, was to replace a rather mechanical form of public bureaucracy, which was permeated with 'illegitimate' lay influence, with a streamlined 'professional' bureaucracy in which lay control was carefully filtered through a corporate school board."

Tyack died on October 27, 2016, in Palo Alto from complications of Parkinson's disease.

== Bibliography (Selected items) ==
- Tyack, David B. Seeking common ground: Public schools in a diverse society (Harvard University Press, 2003).
- Tyack, David B., and Larry Cuban. Tinkering toward utopia (Harvard University Press, 1995). online
- Tyack, David, and Elizabeth Hansot. Learning Together: A History of Coeducation in American Public Schools: A History of Coeducation in American Public Schools (Russell Sage Foundation, 1992).
- Tyack, David, Thomas James, and Aaron Benavot. Law and the shaping of public education, 1785-1954 (University of Wisconsin Press, 1991).
- Tyack, David, and Robert Lowe. "The constitutional moment: Reconstruction and Black education in the South." American Journal of Education (1986): 236-256. in JSTOR
- Tyack, David B., Robert Lowe, and Elisabeth Hansot. Public schools in hard times: The Great Depression and recent years (Harvard University Press, 1984).
- Tyack, David B., and Elisabeth Hansot. Managers of Virtue: Public School Leadership in America, 1820–1980 (Basic Books, 1982).
- Kantor, Harvey, and David Tyack, eds. Work, youth, and schooling: Historical perspectives on vocationalism in American education (Stanford University Press, 1982).
- Tyack, David, and Elisabeth Hansot. "Conflict and consensus in American public education." Daedalus (1981): 1-25. in JSTOR
- Strober, Myra H., and David Tyack. "Why do women teach and men manage? A report on research on schools." Signs 5#3 (1980): 494-503. in JSTOR
- Meyer, John W., David Tyack, Joane Nagel and Audri Gordon. "Public Education as Nation-Building in America: Enrollments and Bureaucratization in the American States, 1870-1930," American Journal of Sociology 85#3 (1979), pp. 591–613 in JSTOR
- "The spread of public schooling in Victorian America: In search of a reinterpretation." History of Education 7#3 (1978): 173-182.
- Tyack, David, and Michael Berkowitz. "The man nobody liked: Toward a social history of the truant officer, 1840-1940." American Quarterly 29.1 (1977): 31-54. in JSTOR
- "Pilgrim's progress: Toward a social history of the school superintendency, 1860-1960." History of Education Quarterly 16.3 (1976): 257-300. in JSTOR
- "Ways of seeing: An essay on the history of compulsory schooling." Harvard Educational Review 46#3 (1976): 355-389.
- The one best system: A history of American urban education (Harvard University Press, 1974).
- "The tribe and the common school: Community control in rural education." American Quarterly 24.1 (1972): 3-19. in JSTOR
- "The perils of pluralism: The background of the Pierce case." American Historical Review (1968): 74-98. in JSTOR
- George Ticknor and the Boston Brahmins (Harvard University Press, 1967)
- "The Kingdom of God and the common school: Protestant ministers and the educational awakening in the West." Harvard Educational Review 36.4 (1966): 447-469.
