= Mona L. Siegel =

American historian

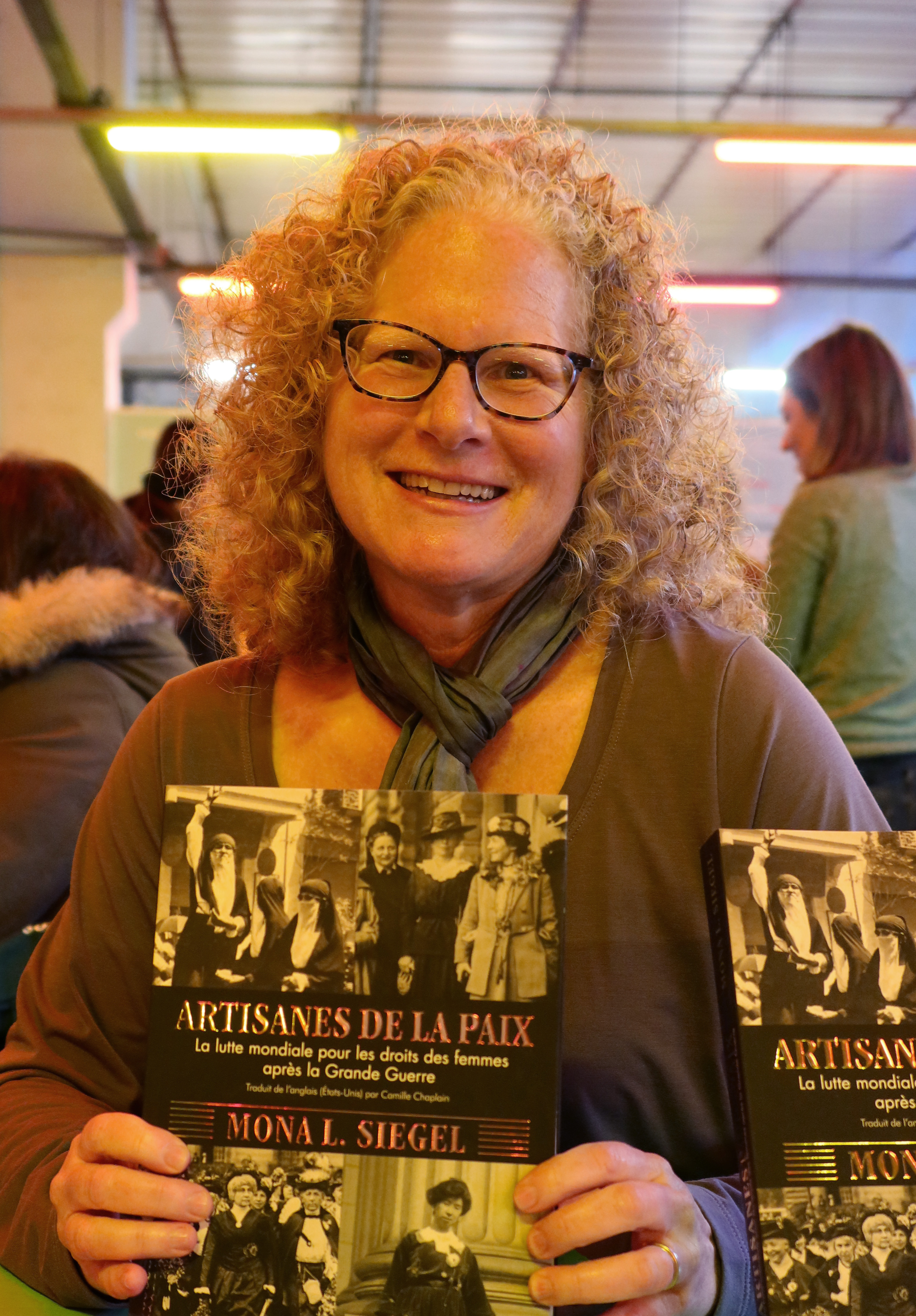
- Siegel in 2024
- Education: University of Wisconsin–Madison (PhD)
- Occupations: Scholar; author; historian

Mona Lesley Siegel is an American scholar, author, and historian whose primary focus is on international feminism, peace, and democracy in Europe and around the world. She is a professor at California State University Sacramento. Siegel has written for and been interviewed by numerous news media on issues ranging from paid family leave to International Women's Day to the history of global feminism.

== Biography ==
Mona Lesley Siegel received her Ph.D. in history from the University of Wisconsin, Madison, in 1996.

In 2004, Cambridge University Press published Siegel's book The Moral Disarmament of France: Education, Pacifism, and Patriotism, 1914-1940, which examines the role of French schoolteachers in fostering French patriotism in the interwar years. The book was awarded the 2006 History of Education Society Outstanding Book Award.

In 2019, Siegel co-wrote, along with Dorothy Sue Cobble, an article for The Washington Post discussing the state of the contemporary debate on paid parental leave and discussing the history of paid parental leave policies. Siegel's articles have also appeared in The New York Times, the Los Angeles Times, and elsewhere.

In January 2020, Siegel published a second book with Columbia University Press entitled Peace On Our Terms: The Global Battle for Women's Rights after the First World War, which examines women's global activism for democracy and peace after World War I.

== Awards and fellowships ==
From 1993 to 1994, Siegel was a Peace Scholar through the United States Institute of Peace, receiving funding for her dissertation, "Lasting Lessons: War, Peace and Patriotism in French Primary Schools, 1914-1939."

Siegel was awarded the Peace History Society's 2011-2012 DeBenedetti Prize in Peace History for her article “Western Feminism and Anti-Imperialism: The Women's International League for Peace and Freedom's Anti-Opium Campaign." The Peace History Society also awarded her the Elise M. Boulding Prize in Peace History for Peace On Our Terms: The Global Battle for Women's Rights after the First World War (2020).

In 2016 and 2018, Siegel received grants from the National Endowment for the Humanities for "archival research leading toward completion of a book on feminist activism and peace negotiations at the end of World War I."
