= Freedmen's Bureau =

US agency assisting freedmen in the South (1865–1872)

Freedmen’s Bureau
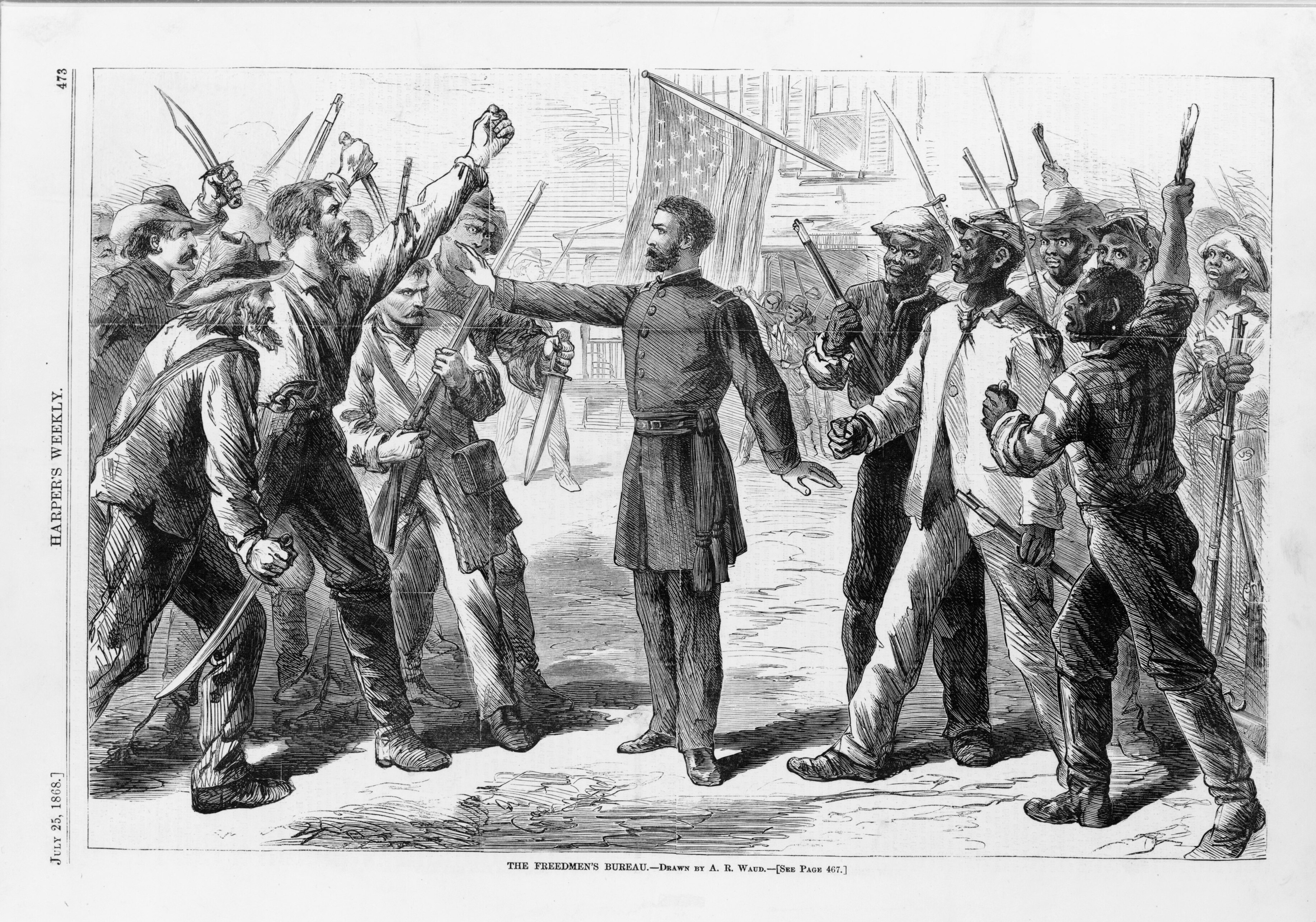
- A Bureau agent stands between a group of Whites and a group of freedmen.

Agency overview
- Formed: March 3, 1865; 161 years ago
- Dissolved: 1872; 154 years ago
- Jurisdiction: Federal government of the United States
- Headquarters: Washington, D.C.
- Agency executive: Oliver Otis Howard, Commissioner
- Parent agency: United States Department of War
- Website: www.archives.gov/research/african-americans/freedmens-bureau

The Bureau of Refugees, Freedmen, and Abandoned Lands, usually referred to as simply the Freedmen's Bureau, was a U.S. government agency of early post American Civil War Reconstruction, assisting freedmen (i.e., former enslaved people) in the South. It was established on March 3, 1865, and operated briefly as a federal agency after the War, from 1865 to November 1872, to direct provisions, clothing, and fuel for the immediate and temporary shelter and supply of destitute and suffering refugees and freedmen and their wives and children.

== Background and operations ==
In 1863, the American Freedmen's Inquiry Commission was established. Two years later, as a result of the inquiry the Freedmen's Bureau Bill was passed, which established the Freedmen's Bureau as initiated by U.S. president Abraham Lincoln. It was intended to last for one year after the end of the Civil War. The Bureau became a part of the United States Department of War, as Congress provided no funding for it. The War Department was the only agency with funds the Freedmen's Bureau could use and which had an existing presence in the South.

Headed by Union Army general Oliver O. Howard, the Bureau started operations in 1865. From the beginning, its representatives found its tasks very difficult, in part because Southern legislatures passed Black Codes that restricted movement, conditions of labor, and other civil rights of Black Americans, nearly replicating the conditions of slavery. Also, the Freedmen's Bureau only controlled a limited amount of arable land.

The Bureau's powers were expanded to help Black Americans find family members from whom they had become separated during the war. It arranged to teach them to read and write—skills considered critical by the freedmen themselves as well as by the government. Bureau agents also served as legal advocates for Black Americans in both state and federal courts, mostly in cases dealing with family issues. The Bureau encouraged former major planters to rebuild their plantations and pay wages to their previously enslaved workers. It kept an eye on the contracts between the newly free laborers and planters, given that few freedmen had yet gained adequate reading skills, and pushed Whites and blacks to work together in a free-labor market as employers and employees rather than as masters and slaves.

Map of abandoned or confiscated plantations in Louisiana and Mississippi offered for lease by the U.S. government during Reconstruction

In 1866 Congress renewed the charter for the Bureau. President Andrew Johnson, a Southern Democrat who had succeeded to the office following Lincoln's assassination in 1865, vetoed the bill, arguing that the Bureau encroached on states' rights, relied inappropriately on the military in peacetime, gave blacks help that poor Whites had never had, and would ultimately prevent freed slaves from becoming self-sufficient by rendering them dependent on public assistance. Though the 39th United States Congress—controlled by Republicans—overrode Johnson's veto, by 1869 Southern Democrats in Congress had deprived the Bureau of most of its funding, and as a result it had to cut much of its staff. By 1870 the Bureau had been weakened further due to the rise of Ku Klux Klan (KKK) violence across the South; members of the KKK and other terrorist organizations, attacked both blacks and sympathetic white Republicans, including teachers. Northern Democrats also opposed the Bureau's work, painting it as a program that would make African Americans "lazy".

In 1872 Congress abruptly abandoned the program, refusing to approve renewal legislation. It did not inform Howard, whom U.S. president Ulysses S. Grant had transferred to Arizona to settle hostilities between the Apache and settlers. Grant's secretary of war William W. Belknap was hostile to Howard's leadership and authority at the Bureau. Belknap aroused controversy among Republicans by his reassignment of Howard.

== Achievements ==
=== Day-to-day duties ===
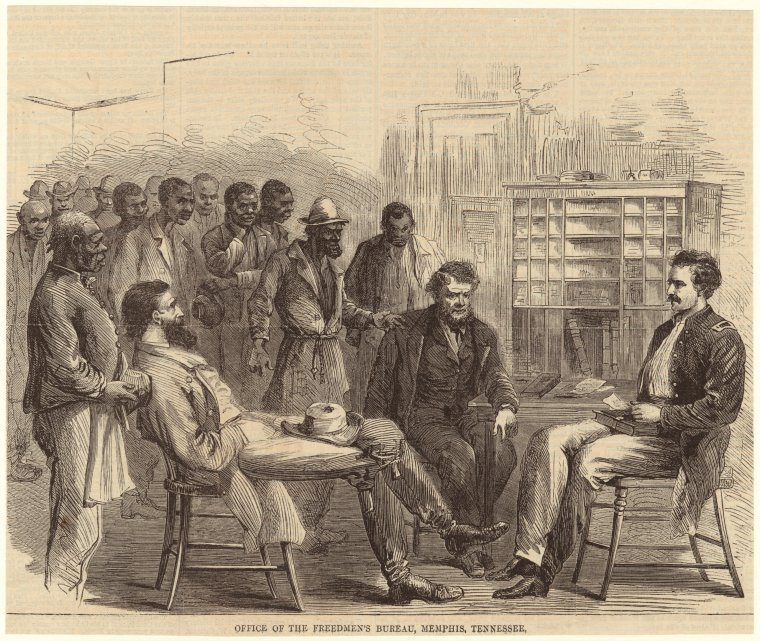
The Freedmen's Bureau office in Memphis, Tennessee, 1866

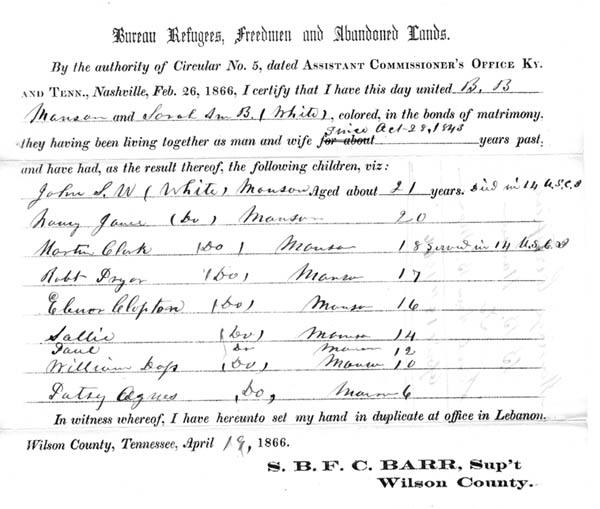
Marriage certificate issued by the Bureau of Refugees, Freedmen and Abandoned Lands, Wilson County, Tennessee, 1866

The Bureau mission was to help solve everyday problems of the newly freed slaves, such as obtaining food, medical care, communication with family members, and jobs. Between 1865 and 1869, it distributed 15 million rations of food to freed African Americans and 5 million rations to impoverished whites, and set up a system by which planters could borrow rations in order to feed freedmen they employed. Although the Bureau set aside $350,000 for this latter service, only $35,000 (10%) was borrowed by planters.

The Bureau's humanitarian efforts had limited success. Medical treatment of the freedmen was severely deficient, as few Southern doctors, all of whom were White, would treat them. Much infrastructure had been destroyed by the war, and people had few means of improving sanitation. Blacks had little opportunity to become medical personnel. Travelers unknowingly carried epidemics of cholera and yellow fever along the river corridors, which broke out across the South and caused many fatalities, especially among the poor.

=== Gender roles ===
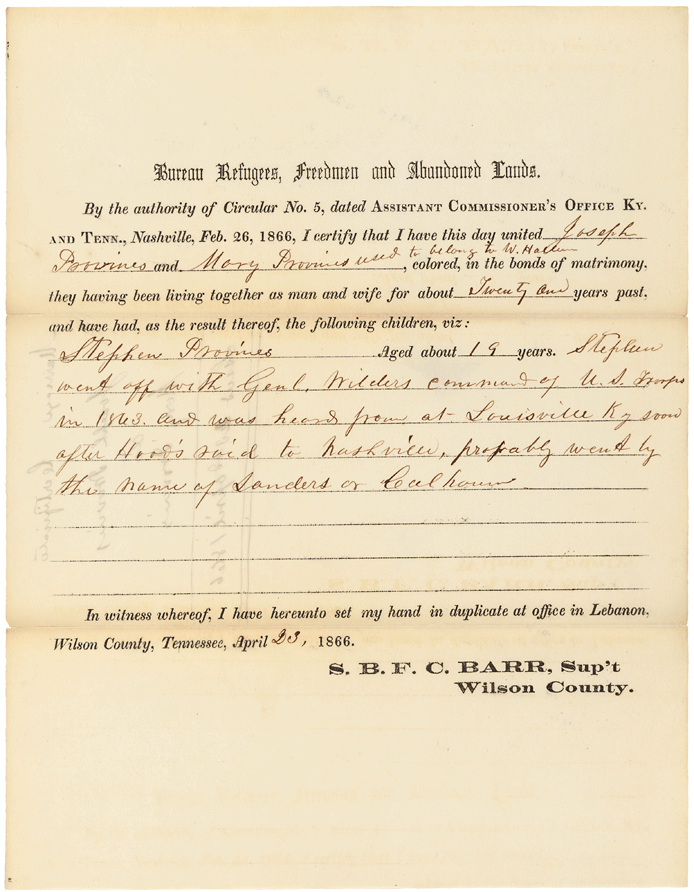
A certificate of marriage issued by the Freedmen's Bureau

Freedmen's Bureau agents initially complained that freedwomen were refusing to contract their labor. One of the first actions black families took for independence was to withdraw women's labor from fieldwork. The Bureau attempted to force freedwomen to work by insisting that their husbands sign contracts making the whole family available as field labor in the cotton industry, and by declaring that unemployed freedwomen should be treated as vagrants just as black men were. The Bureau did allow some exceptions, such as married women with employed husbands, and some "worthy" women who had been widowed or abandoned and had large families of small children to care for. Women considered "unworthy" by the Bureau, were often penalized.

Before the Civil War the enslaved could not marry legally, and most marriages had been informal, although planters often presided over "marriage" ceremonies for their enslaved. After the war, the Freedmen's Bureau performed numerous marriages for freed couples who asked for it. As many husbands, wives, and children had been forcibly separated under slavery, the Bureau agents helped families reunite after the war. The Bureau had an informal regional communications system that allowed agents to send inquiries and provide answers. It sometimes provided transportation to reunite families. Freedmen and freedwomen turned to the Bureau for assistance in resolving issues of abandonment and divorce.

=== Education ===
The most widely recognized accomplishments of the Freedmen's Bureau were in education. Prior to the Civil War, no Southern state had a system of universal, state-supported public education; in addition, most had prohibited both enslaved and free blacks from gaining an education. This meant learning to read and write, and do simple arithmetic. Former slaves wanted public education while the wealthier Whites opposed the idea. Freedmen had a strong desire to learn to read and write; some had already started schools at refugee camps; others worked hard to establish schools in their communities even prior to the advent of the Freedmen's Bureau. The Freedmen's Bureau schools were also open to poor Whites, but almost no Whites attended because "Despite the absence of statewide systems in most Southern states, most parents preferred to consign their children to illiteracy rather than to see them educated alongside black children."

Oliver Otis Howard was appointed as the first Freedmen's Bureau Commissioner. Through his leadership, the bureau set up four divisions: Government-Controlled Lands, Records, Financial Affairs, and Medical Affairs. Education was considered part of the Records division. Howard turned over confiscated property including planters' mansions, government buildings, books, and furniture to superintendents to be used in the education of freedmen. He provided transportation and room and board for teachers. Many Northerners came south to educate freedmen.

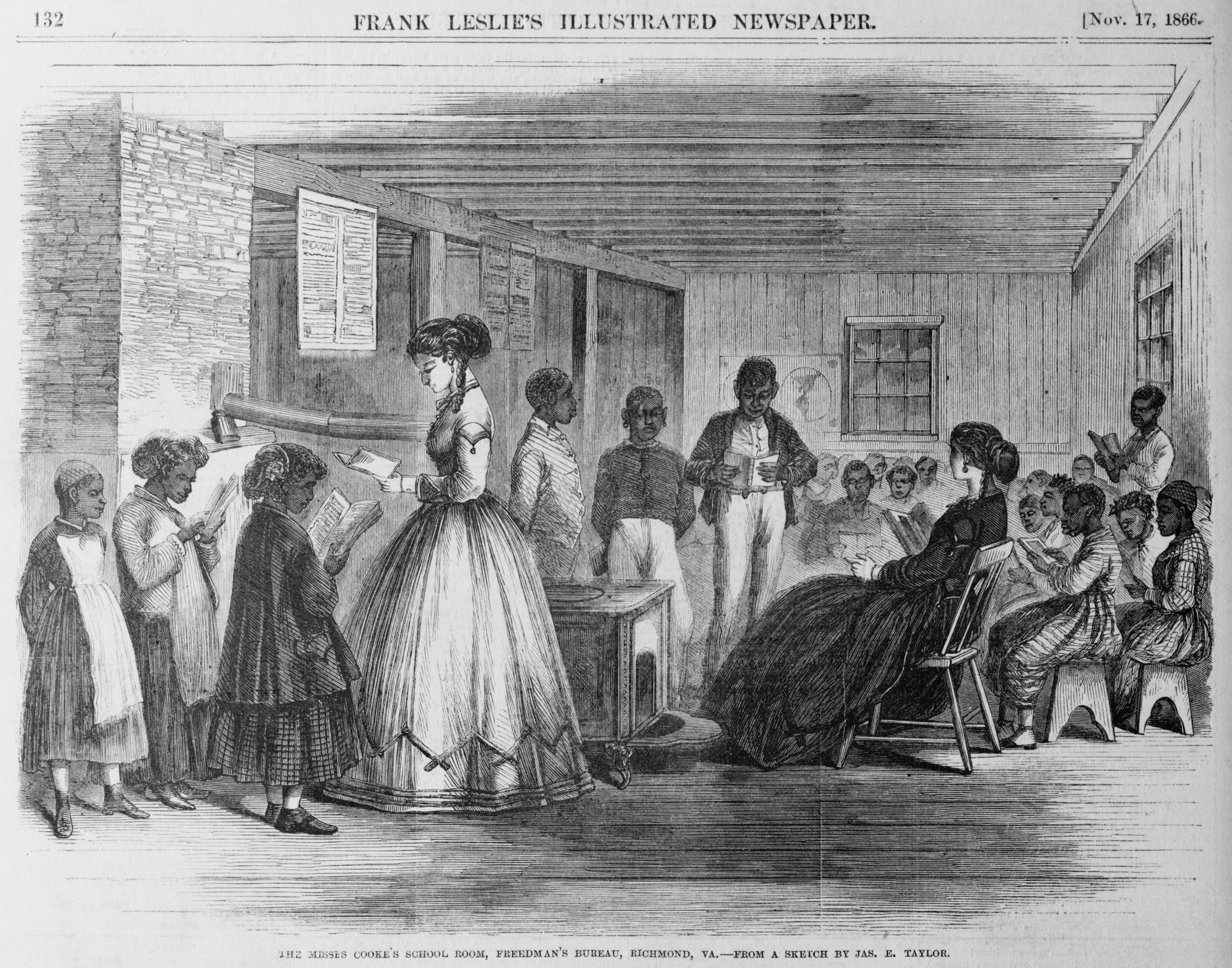
The Misses Cooke's school room, Freedmen's Bureau, Richmond, Virginia, 1866

By 1866, Northern missionary and aid societies worked in conjunction with the Freedmen's Bureau to provide education for former slaves. The American Missionary Association (AMA) was particularly active, establishing eleven "colleges" in Southern states for the education of freedmen. The primary focus of these groups was to raise funds to pay teachers and manage schools, while the secondary focus was the day-to-day operation of individual schools. After 1866, Congress appropriated some funds to operate the Freedmen's schools. The main source of educational revenue for these schools came through a Congressional Act that gave the Freedmen's Bureau the power to seize Confederate property for educational use.

George Ruby, a Black American, served as a teacher and school administrator and as a traveling inspector for the Bureau, observing local conditions, aiding in the establishment of black schools, and evaluating the performance of Bureau field officers. Blacks supported him, but planters and other whites opposed him.

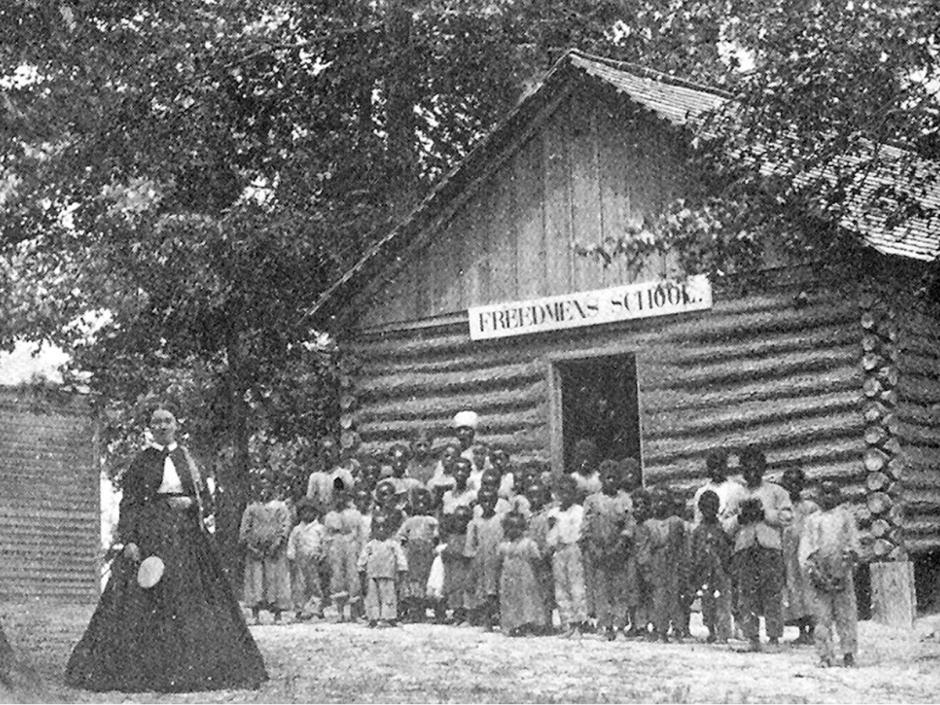
Freedmen's School, James Plantation, North Carolina

Overall, the Bureau spent $5 million to set up schools for blacks. By the end of 1865, more than 90,000 former slaves were enrolled as students in such public schools. Attendance rates at the new schools for freedmen were about 80%. Brigadier General Samuel Chapman Armstrong created and led Hampton Normal and Agricultural Institute in Virginia in 1868. It is now known as Hampton University.

The Freedmen's Bureau published their own freedmen's textbook. They emphasized the bootstrap philosophy, encouraging freedmen to believe that each person had the ability to work hard and to do better in life. These readers included traditional literacy lessons, as well as selections on the life and works of Abraham Lincoln, excerpts from the Bible focused on forgiveness, biographies of famous Black Americans with emphasis on their piety, humbleness, and industry; and essays on humility, the work ethic, temperance, loving one's enemies, and avoiding bitterness.

J. W. Alvord, an inspector for the Bureau, wrote that the freedmen "have the natural thirst for knowledge", aspire to "power and influence ... coupled with learning", and are excited by "the special study of books". Among the former slaves, both children and adults sought this new opportunity to learn. After the Bureau was abolished, some of its achievements collapsed under the weight of White violence against schools and teachers for blacks. Most Reconstruction-era legislatures had established public education but, after the 1870s, when White Democrats regained power of Southern governments, they reduced funds available to fund public education, particularly for blacks. Beginning in 1890 in Mississippi, Democratic-dominated legislatures in the South passed new state constitutions disenfranchising most blacks by creating barriers to voter registration. They then passed Jim Crow laws establishing legal segregation of public places. Segregated schools and other services for blacks were consistently underfunded by the Southern legislatures.

By 1871, Northerners' interest in reconstructing the South had waned. Northerners were beginning to tire of the effort that Reconstruction required, were discouraged by the high rate of continuing violence around elections, and were ready for the South to take care of itself. All of the Southern states had created new constitutions that established universal, publicly funded education. Groups based in the North began to redirect their money toward universities and colleges founded to educate African-American leaders.

== Teachers ==
Written accounts by northern women and missionary societies resulted in historians' overestimating their influence, writing that most Bureau teachers were well-educated women from the North, motivated by religion and abolitionism to teach in the South. In the early 21st century, new research has found that half the teachers were Southern Whites; one-third were blacks (mostly Southern), and one-sixth were Northern Whites. Few were abolitionists; few came from New England. Men outnumbered women. The salary was the strongest motivation except for the Northerners, who were typically funded by Northern organizations and had a humanitarian motivation. As a group, the black cohort showed the greatest commitment to racial equality; and they were the ones most likely to remain teachers. The school curriculum resembled that of schools in the north.

=== Colleges ===
The building and opening by the AMA and other missionary societies of schools of higher learning for black Americans coincided with the shift in focus for the Freedmen's Aid Societies from supporting an elementary education for all black Americans to enable black-American leaders to gain high school and college educations. Some White officials working with black Americans in the South were concerned about what they considered the lack of a moral or financial foundation seen in the black-American community and traced that lack of foundation back to slavery.

Generally, they believed that blacks needed help to enter a free labor market and rebuild a stable family life. Heads of local American Missionary Associations sponsored various educational and religious efforts for black Americans. Later efforts for higher education were supported by such leaders as Samuel Chapman Armstrong of the Hampton Institute and Booker T. Washington of the Tuskegee Institute (from 1881). They said that black students should be able to leave home and "live in an atmosphere conducive not only to scholarship but to culture and refinement".

Most of these colleges, universities and normal schools combined what they believed were the best fundamentals of a college with that of the home, giving students a basic structure to build acceptable practices of upstanding lives. At many of these institutions, Christian principles and practices were also part of the daily regime.

=== Educational legacy ===
Despite the untimely dissolution of the Freedmen's Bureau, its legacy influenced the important historically Black colleges and universities (HBCUs), which were the chief institutions of higher learning for blacks through the decades of segregation into the mid-20th century. Under the direction and sponsorship of the Bureau, together with the American Missionary Association in many cases, from approximately 1866 until its termination in 1872, an estimated 25 institutions of higher learning for Freedmen were established. The leaders among them continue to operate as highly ranked institutions in the 21st century and have seen increasing enrollment. (Examples of HBCUs include Howard University, St. Augustine's College, Fisk University, Johnson C. Smith University, Clark Atlanta University, Dillard University, Shaw University, Virginia Union University, and Tougaloo College.)

As of 2009, there exist approximately 105 HBCUs that range in scope, size, organization, and orientation. Under the Education Act of 1965, Congress officially defined an HBCU as "an institution whose principal missions were and are the education of Black Americans". HBCUs graduate over 50% of Black-American professionals, 50% of Black-American public school teachers, and 70% of Black-American dentists. In addition, 50% of students who graduate from HBCUs pursue graduate or professional degrees. One in three degrees held by Black Americans in the natural sciences, and half the degrees held by Black Americans in mathematics, were earned at HBCUs.

Perhaps the best known of these institutions is Howard University, founded in Washington, D.C., in 1867, with the aid of the Freedmen's Bureau. It was named for the commissioner of the Freedmen's Bureau, General Oliver Otis Howard.

=== Church establishment ===
After the Civil War, control over existing churches was a contentious issue. The Methodist denomination had split into regional associations in the 1840s prior to the war, as had the Baptists, when Southern Baptists were founded. In some cities, Northern Methodists seized control of Southern Methodist buildings. Numerous Northern denominations, including the independent Black denominations of the African Methodist Episcopal (AME) and African Methodist Episcopal Zion, sent missionaries to the South to help the Freedmen and plant new congregations. By this time the independent Black denominations were increasingly well organized and prepared to evangelize to the freedmen. Within a decade, the AME and AME Zion churches had gained hundreds of thousands of new members and were rapidly organizing new congregations.

Even before the war, Blacks had established independent Baptist congregations in some cities and towns, such as Silver Bluff and Charleston, South Carolina; and Petersburg and Richmond, Virginia. In many places, especially in more rural areas, they shared public services with Whites. Often the enslaved met secretly to conduct their own services away from White supervision or oversight. After the war, Freedmen mostly withdrew from the White-dominated congregations of the Baptist, Methodist and Presbyterian churches in order to be free of White supervision. Within a short time, they were organizing Black Baptist state associations and organized a national association in the 1890s.

Northern mission societies raised funds for land, buildings, teachers' salaries, and basic necessities such as books and furniture. For years they used networks throughout their churches to raise money for freedmen's education and worship.

== Continuing insurgency ==
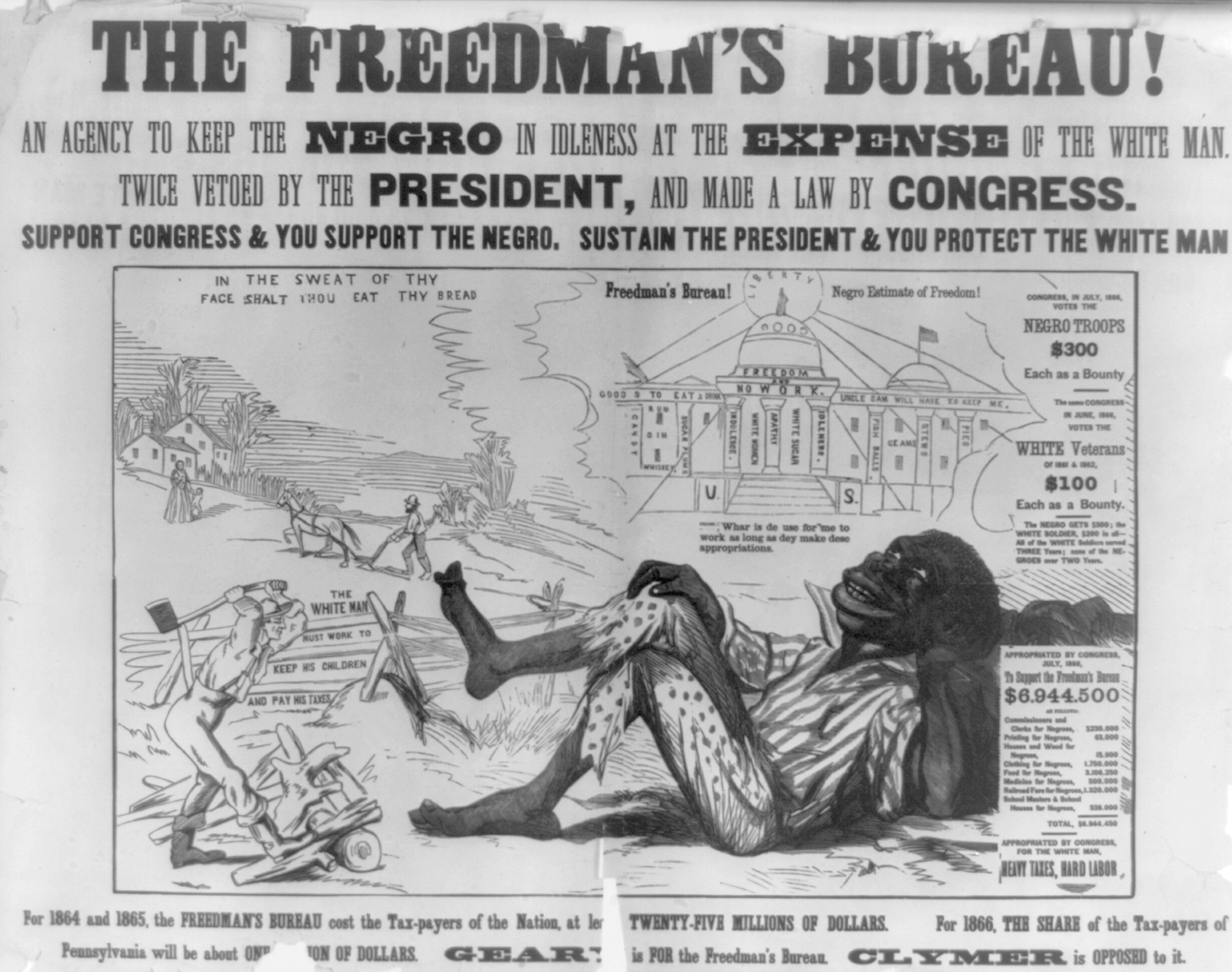
An 1866 poster attacking the Freedmen's Bureau

Most of the assistant commissioners, realizing that Freedmen would not receive fair trials in the civil courts, tried to handle black cases in their own Bureau courts. Southern White Democrats objected that this was unconstitutional. In Alabama, the Bureau commissioned state and county judges as Bureau agents. They were to try cases involving blacks with no distinctions on racial grounds. If a judge refused, the Freedmen's Bureau could institute martial law in his district. All but three judges accepted their unwanted commissions, and the governor urged compliance.

Perhaps the most difficult region reported by the Freedmen's Bureau was Louisiana's Caddo and Bossier parishes in the northwest part of the state. It had not suffered wartime devastation or Union occupation, but White hostility was high against the black majority population. Well-meaning Bureau agents were understaffed and weakly supported by federal troops, and found their investigations blocked and authority undermined at every turn by recalcitrant plantation owners. Murders of freedmen were common, and White suspects in these cases were not prosecuted. Bureau agents did negotiate labor contracts, build schools and hospitals, and aid Freedmen, but they struggled against the violence of the oppressive environment.

In addition to internal parish problems, this area was reportedly invaded by insurgents from Arkansas, described as Desperadoes by the Bureau agent in 1868. In September 1868, for example, Whites arrested and convicted 21 black people accused of planning an insurrection in Bossier Parish. Henry Jones, accused of being the leader of the purported insurrection, was shot and left to burn by Whites, but he survived, badly hurt. Other Freedmen were killed or driven from their land by Arkansas Desperadoes. Whites were anxious about their power as blacks were to receive the franchise, and tensions were rising over land use. In early October, blacks arrested two Whites from Arkansas "accused of being part of a mob ... that killed several Negroes." The agent reported 14 blacks had been killed in this incident, then said that another eight to ten had been killed by the same Desperadoes. Blacks were reported to have killed the two White men in the altercation. The Whites' Arkansas friends and local Whites went on a rampage against blacks in the area, resulting in more than 150 blacks being killed.

In March 1872, at the request of President Ulysses S. Grant and the Secretary of the Interior, Columbus Delano, General Howard was asked to temporarily leave his duties as Commissioner of the Bureau to deal with Indian affairs in the west. Upon returning from his assignment in November 1872, General Howard discovered that the Bureau and all of its activities had been officially terminated by Congress, effective as of June. While General Howard was dealing with Indian affairs in the west, the Freedmen's Bureau was steadily losing its support in Congress. President Johnson had opposed the Freedmen's Bureau and his attitude encouraged many people, especially White Southerners, to challenge the Bureau. But insurgents showed that the war had not ended, as armed Whites attacked black Republicans and their sympathizers, including teachers and officeholders. Congress dismantled the Bureau in 1872 due to pressure from White Southerners. The Bureau was unable to change much of the social dynamic as Whites continued to seek supremacy over blacks, frequently with violence.

In his autobiography, General Howard expressed great frustration about Congress having closed down the bureau. He said, "the legislative action, however, was just what I desired, except that I would have preferred to close out my own Bureau and not have another do it for me in an unfriendly manner in my absence." All documents and matters pertaining to the Freedmen's Bureau were transferred from the office of General Howard to the War Department of the United States Congress.

== State programs ==
=== Alabama ===
The Bureau began distributing rations in the summer of 1865. Drought conditions resulted in so much need that the state established its own Office of the Commissioner of the Destitute to provide additional relief. The two agencies coordinated their efforts starting in 1866. The Bureau established depots in eight major cities. Counties were allocated aid in kind each month based on the number of poor reported. The counties were required to provide transportation from the depots for the supplies. The ration was larger in winter and spring, and reduced in seasons when locally grown food was available.

In 1866, the depot at Huntsville provided five thousand rations a day. The food was distributed without regard to race. Corruption and abuse was so great that in October 1866, President Johnson ended in-kind aid in that state. One hundred twenty thousand dollars was given to the state to provide relief to the end of January 1867. Aid was ended in the state. Records show that by the end of the program, four times as many White people received aid than did Black people.

=== Florida ===
The Florida Bureau was assessed to be working effectively. Thomas Ward Osborne, the assistant commissioner of the Freedmen's Bureau for Florida, was an astute politician who collaborated with the leadership of both parties in the state. He was warmly praised by observers on all sides. In an annual report dated October 1, 1866, it was reported that the Bureau had appointed twenty-four civilian special agents to assist the eighteen military officers who were already serving as Sub-assistant Commissioners.

=== Georgia ===
The Bureau played a major role in Georgia politics. It was especially active in setting up, monitoring, and enforcing labor contracts for both men and women. It also set up a new system of healthcare for the freedmen. Although a majority of the agency's relief rations went to freedpeople, a large number of Whites also benefited. In Georgia, poor Whites received almost one-fifth of the Bureau's rations.

=== North Carolina ===
In North Carolina, the bureau employed: 9 contract surgeons, at $100 per month; 26 hospital attendants, at average pay each per month $11.25; 18 civilian employees, clerks, agents, etc., at an average pay per month of $17.20; 4 laborers, at an average pay per month of $11.90, for a total annual salaries of $18,596.40, which is approximately $595,000 in 2024 dollars; enlisted men are detailed as orderlies, guards, etc., by commanding officers of the different military posts where officers of the Bureau were serving.

Some misconduct was reported to the bureau main office that bureau agents were using their posts for personal gains. Colonel E. Whittlesey was questioned but said he was not involved in nor knew of anyone involved in such activities. The bureau exercised what Whites believed were arbitrary powers: making arrests, imposing fines, and inflicting punishments. They were considered to be disregarding the local laws and especially the statute of limitations. Their activities resulted in resentment among Whites toward the federal government in general. These powers invoked negative feelings in many Southerners that sparked many to want the agency to leave. In their review, Steedman and Fullerton repeated their conclusion from Virginia, which was to withdraw the Bureau and turn daily operations over to the military.

=== South Carolina ===
In South Carolina, the bureau employed nine clerks, at average pay each per month $108.33, one rental agent, at monthly pay of $75.00, one clerk, at monthly pay of $50.00, one storekeeper, at monthly pay of $85.00, one counselor, at monthly pay of $125.00, one superintendent of education, at monthly pay of $150.00, one printer, at monthly pay of $100.00, one contract surgeon, at monthly pay of $100.00, and twenty-five laborers, at average pay per month $19.20. Total annual salaries of $25,679.64 which is $821,600 in 2024 dollars.

General Saxton was head of the bureau operations in South Carolina; he was reported by Steedman and Fullerton to have made so many "mistakes and blunders" that he made matters worse for the freedmen. He was replaced by Brigadier General R. K. Scott. Steedman and Fullerton described Scott as energetic and a competent officer. It appeared that he took great pains to turn things around and correct the mistakes made by his predecessors.

The investigators learned of reported murders of freedmen by a band of outlaws. These outlaws were thought to be people from other states, such as Texas, Kentucky and Tennessee, who had been part of the rebel army (Ku Klux Klan chapters were similarly started by veterans in the first years after the war.) When citizens were asked why the perpetrators had not been arrested, many answered that the Bureau, with the support of the military, had the primary authority.

In certain areas, such as the Sea Islands, many Freedmen were destitute. Many had tried to cultivate the land and began businesses with little to no success in the social disruption of the period.

=== Texas ===
Suffering much less damage in the war than some other Deep South states, Texas became a destination for some 200,000 refugee blacks from other parts of the South, in addition to 200,000 already in Texas. Slavery had been prevalent only in East Texas, and some freedmen hoped for the chance of new types of opportunity in the lightly populated but booming state. The Bureau's political role was central, as was close attention to the need for schools.

=== Virginia ===
The Freedmen's Bureau had 58 clerks and superintendents of farms, paid average monthly wages $78.50; 12 assistant superintendents, paid average monthly wages 87.00; and 163 laborers, paid average monthly wages 11.75; as personnel in the state of Virginia. Other personnel included orderlies and guards.

During the war, slaves had escaped to Union lines and forts in the Tidewater, where contraband camps were established. Many stayed in that area after the war, seeking protection near the federal forts. The Bureau fed 9,000 to 10,000 blacks a month over the winter, explaining:

A majority of the freedmen to whom this subsistence has been furnished are undoubtedly able to earn a living if they were removed to localities where labor could be procured. The necessity for issuing rations to this class of persons results from their accumulation in large numbers in certain places where the land is unproductive and the demand for labor is limited. As long as these people remain in the present localities, the civil authorities refuse to provide for the able-bodied, and are unable to care for the helpless and destitute among them, owing to their great number and the fact that very few are residents of the counties in which they have congregated during the war. The necessity for the relief extended to these people, both able-bodied and helpless, by the Government, will continue as long as they remain in their present condition, and while rations are issued to the able-bodied they will not voluntarily change their localities to seek places where they can procure labor.

== Bureau records ==
In 2000, the U.S. Congress passed the Freedmen's Bureau Preservation Act, which directed the National Archivist to preserve the extensive records of the Bureau on microfilm, and work with educational institutions to index the records. In addition to those records of the Bureau headquarters, assistant commissioners, and superintendents of education, the National Archives now has records of the field offices, marriage records, and records of the Freedmen's Branch of the Adjutant General on microfilm. They are being digitized and made available through online databases. These constitute a major source of documentation on the operations of the Bureau, political and social conditions in the Reconstruction Era, and the genealogies of freedpeople. (Note: For access and inquires about the use of the records, researchers should visit or write (e-mail) the Old Military and Civil Branch, 700 Pennsylvania Avenue, NW, Washington, DC 20408. For the location of previously filmed and future Freedmen's Bureau microfilm publications, researchers should contact the nearest regional archives or visit the NARA online microfilm catalog. By 2014, under arrangement with the National Archives, records are available online through FamilySearch and Ancestry.) The Freedmen's Bureau Project (announced on June 19, 2015) was created as a set of partnerships between FamilySearch International and the National Archives and Records Administration (NARA), the Smithsonian's National Museum of African American History and Culture, the Afro-American Historical and Genealogical Society (AAHGS), and the California African American Museum. With the help of more than 25,000 volunteers, the project was completed on June 20, 2016. Information about millions of African Americans is now accessible, allowing families to build their family trees and connect with their ancestors.

In October 2006, Virginia governor Tim Kaine announced that Virginia would be the first state to index and digitize Freedmen's Bureau records.

== See also ==
- History of African-American education
- United States House Committee on Freedmen’s Affairs
- Freedmen's Savings Bank
- Freedmen's Hospitals
- Freedmen's Schools
- Freedmen's Cemetery Chalmette, Louisiana
- McHatton Home Colony
- Forty acres and a mule

== Notes ==
Digital Volunteers are transcribing the Freedmen Bureau records through the Smithsonian Transcription Center. By June, 2025, more than 98,000 volunteers have transcribed 1,491,092 pages, making them accessible and seachable. https://transcription.si.edu/ The Freedmen’s Bureau Search Portal is found at https://nmaahc.si.edu/explore/freedmens-bureau.

== Sources ==
=== General ===
- Bentley, George R. (1955). A History of the Freedmen's Bureau. Philadelphia: University of Pennsylvania. hdl:2027/mdp.39015002382383 – via HathiTrust.; a scholarly history
- Carpenter, John A. (1999). Sword and Olive Branch: Oliver Otis Howard. New York: Fordham University Press. doi:10.1515/9780823296705. ISBN 9780823296705. S2CID 244946261.; full biography of Bureau leader
- Cimbala, Paul A. (2005). The Freedmen's Bureau: Reconstructing the American South after the Civil War. Anvil series. Malabar, Fla.: Krieger. ISBN 9781575240947.
- Cimbala, Paul A.; Trefousse, Hans L., eds. (2005). The Freedmen's Bureau: Reconstructing the American South After the Civil War.; essays by scholars.
- Colby, I. C. (1985). "The Freedmen's Bureau: From Social Welfare to Segregation". Phylon. 46 (3): 219–230. doi:10.2307/274830. JSTOR 274830.
- Du Bois, W. E. B. (March 1901). "The Freedmen's Bureau". The Atlantic Monthly. Vol. 87, no. 519. pp. 354–365.
- Foner, Eric (1988). Reconstruction: America's Unfinished Revolution, 1863–1877. New American nation. New York: Harper & Row. ISBN 9780060158514.
- Goldberg, Chad Alan (2007). Citizens and Paupers: Relief, Rights, and Race, from the Freedmen's Bureau to Workfare. Chicago: University of Chicago Press. ISBN 9780226300764. Compares the Bureau with the Works Progress Administration in the 1930s and welfare today. Excerpt and text search
- Howard, O. O. (1907). Autobiography of Oliver Otis Howard, Major General, United States Army. Vol. 2. New York: The Baker & Taylor Company. OCLC 1637484 – via Archive.org.
- Litwack, Leon F. (1979). Been in the Storm So Long: The Aftermath of Slavery. Knopf. ISBN 9780394743981.
- McFeely, William S. (1994). Yankee Stepfather: General O.O. Howard and the Freedmen. New York: W.W. Norton. ISBN 9780393311785 – via Archive.org.; biography of Bureau's head.
- McPherson, James M. (1964). The struggle for equality: Abolitionists and the Negro in the Civil War and Reconstruction. Princeton: Princeton University Press – via Archive.org.
- McPherson, James M. (1995). The abolitionist legacy: From reconstruction to the NAACP. Princeton: Princeton University Press. ISBN 9780691100395 – via Archive.org.
- Zuczek, Richard, ed. (2006). Encyclopedia of the Reconstruction Era. Westport: Greenwood Press. pp. 271–274.

=== Supporting education ===
- Abbott, Martin. "The Freedmen's Bureau and Negro Schooling in South Carolina", South Carolina Historical Magazine, Vol. 57#2 (Apr., 1956), pp. 65–81 in JSTOR
- Anderson, James D. The Education of Blacks in the South, 1860–1935 (1988).
- Butchart, Ronald E. Northern Schools, Southern Blacks, and Reconstruction: Freedmen's Education, 1862–1875 (1980).
- Cimbala, Paul, and Randall Miller, eds. The Freedmen's Bureau and Reconstruction (Fordham University Press, 2020). online book review
- Hornsby, Alton. "The Freedmen's Bureau Schools in Texas, 1865–1870", Southwestern Historical Quarterly, Vol. 76#4 (April, 1973), pp. 397–417 in JSTOR
- Jackson, L. P. "The Educational Efforts of the Freedmen's Bureau and Freedmen's Aid Societies in South Carolina, 1862–1872", The Journal of Negro History (1923), vol 8#1, pp 1–40. in JSTOR
- Jones, Jacqueline. Soldiers of Light and Love: Northern Teachers and Georgia Blacks, 1865–1873 (1980).
- Myers, John B. "The Education of the Alabama Freedmen During Presidential Reconstruction, 1865–1867", Journal of Negro Education, Vol. 40#2 (Spring 1971), pp. 163–171 in JSTOR
- Parker, Marjorie H. "The Educational Activities of the Freedmen's Bureau" (PhD dissertation, The University of Chicago; ProQuest Dissertations Publishing, 1951. T-01438).
  - Parker, Marjorie H. "Some Educational Activities of the Freedmen's Bureau", Journal of Negro Education, Vol. 23#1 (Winter, 1954), pp. 9–21. in JSTOR
- Richardson, Joe M. Christian Reconstruction: The American Missionary Association and Southern Blacks, 1861–1890 (1986)
- Richardson, Joe M. "The Freedmen's Bureau and Negro Education in Florida", Journal of Negro Education, Vol. 31#4 (Autumn, 1962), pp. 460–467. in JSTOR
- Span, Christopher M. "'I Must Learn Now or Not at All': Social and Cultural Capital in the Educational Initiatives of Formerly Enslaved African Americans in Mississippi, 1862–1869", The Journal of African American History, 2002, pp. 196–222.
- Tyack, David, and Robert Lowe. "The Constitutional Moment: Reconstruction and Black Education in the South", American Journal of Education, Vol. 94#2 (February 1986), pp. 236–256 in JSTOR
- Vaughn, William Preston, "Schools for All: The Blacks and Public Education in the South, 1865–1877" (1974). online
- Williams, Heather Andrea; "'Clothing Themselves in Intelligence': The Freedpeople, Schooling, and Northern Teachers, 1861–1871", The Journal of African American History, 2002, pp. 372+.
- Williams, Heather Andrea (2006). Self-Taught: African American Education in Slavery and Freedom. Archived from the original on August 10, 2011 – via Questia.

=== Specialized studies ===
- Bethel, Elizabeth . "The Freedmen's Bureau in Alabama", Journal of Southern History Vol. 14, No. 1, (February 1948) pp. 49–92 in JSTOR.
- Bickers, John M. "The Power to Do What Manifestly Must Be Done: Congress, the Freedmen's Bureau, and Constitutional Imagination", Roger Williams University Law Review, Vol. 12, No. 70, 2006 online at SSRN.
- Cimbala, Paul A. "On the Front Line of Freedom: Freedmen's Bureau Officers and Agents in Reconstruction Georgia, 1865–1868", Georgia Historical Quarterly 1992 76(3): 577–611. ISSN 0016-8297.
- Cimbala, Paul A. Under the Guardianship of the Nation: the Freedmen's Bureau and the Reconstruction of Georgia, 1865–1870 (1997).
- Click, Patricia C. Time Full of Trial: The Roanoke Island Freedmen's Colony, 1862–1867 (2001).
- Crouch, Barry. The Freedmen's Bureau and Black Texans (1992).
- Crouch; Barry A. "The 'Chords of Love': Legalizing Black Marital and Family Rights in Postwar Texas", The Journal of Negro History, Vol. 79, 1994.
- Downs, Jim. Sick from Freedom: African-American Illness and Suffering during the Civil War and Reconstruction (Oxford University Press, 2012)
- Durrill, Wayne K. "Political Legitimacy and Local Courts: 'Politicks at Such a Rage' in a Southern Community during Reconstruction", in Journal of Southern History, Vol. 70 #3, 2004 pp. 577–617.
- Farmer-Kaiser, Mary. "'Are They Not in Some Sorts Vagrants?' Gender and the Efforts of the Freedmen's Bureau to Combat Vagrancy in the Reconstruction South", Georgia Historical Quarterly 2004 88(1): 25–49. ISSN 0016-8297.
- Farmer-Kaiser, Mary. Freedwomen and the Freedmen's Bureau: Race, Gender, and Public Policy in the Age of Emancipation (Fordham University Press, 2010); describes how freedwomen found both an ally and an enemy in the Bureau.
- Finley, Randy. From Slavery to Future: the Freedmen's Bureau in Arkansas, 1865–1869 (1996).
- Lieberman, Robert C. "The Freedmen's Bureau and the Politics of Institutional Structure", Social Science History 1994 18(3): 405–437. ISSN 0145-5532.
- Lowe, Richard (1993). "The Freedman's Bureau and Local Black Leadership". Journal of American History. 80 (3): 989–998. doi:10.2307/2080411. JSTOR 2080411.
- Morrow Ralph Ernst. Northern Methodism and Reconstruction (1956)
- May J. Thomas. "Continuity and Change in the Labor Program of the Union Army and the Freedmen's Bureau", Civil War History 17 (September 1971): 245–54.
- Oubre, Claude F. Forty Acres and a Mule. (1978).
- Pearson, Reggie L. "'There Are Many Sick, Feeble, and Suffering Freedmen': the Freedmen's Bureau's Health-care Activities During Reconstruction in North Carolina, 1865–1868", North Carolina Historical Review 2002 79(2): 141–181. ISSN 0029-2494 .
- Richter, William L. Overreached on All Sides: The Freedmen's Bureau Administrators in Texas, 1865–1868 (1991).
- Rodrigue, John C. "Labor Militancy and Black Grassroots Political Mobilization in the Louisiana Sugar Region, 1865–1868" in Journal of Southern History, Vol. 67 #1, 2001, pp. 115–45.
- Schwalm, Leslie A. "'Sweet Dreams of Freedom': Freedwomen's Reconstruction of Life and Labor in Lowcountry South Carolina", Journal of Women's History, Vol. 9 #1, 1997 pp. 9–32.
- Smith, Solomon K. "The Freedmen's Bureau in Shreveport: the Struggle for Control of the Red River District", Louisiana History 2000 41(4): 435–465. ISSN 0024-6816.
- Williamson, Joel. After Slavery: The Negro in South Carolina during Reconstruction, 1861–1877 (1965).
- Freedmen's Bureau in Texas, Texas Handbook of History online

=== Primary sources ===
- Berlin, Ira, ed. Free at Last: A Documentary History of Slavery, Freedom, and the Civil War (1995)
- Stone, William. "Bitter Freedom:" William Stone's Record of Service in the Freedmen's Bureau, edited by Suzanne Stone Johnson and Robert Allison Johnson (2008), memoir by white Bureau official
- Minutes of the Freedmen's Convention, Held in the City of Raleigh, North Carolina, October, 1866
- Freedmen's Bureau Online
- Reports and Speeches
- General Howard's report for 1869: The House of Representatives, Forty-first Congress, second session
