= Tinkering Toward Utopia =

1995 book by David Tyack and Larry Cuban

Tinkering toward Utopia
- Author: David Tyack, Larry Cuban
- Subject: History of education in the United States
- Published: 1995 (Harvard University Press)
- Pages: 184
- ISBN: 0-674-89282-8

Tinkering toward Utopia: A Century of Public School Reform is a history of American public school reform written by David Tyack and Larry Cuban. It was published by Harvard University Press in 1995.
