= Aaron Benavot =

American educational theorist

- Education: Stanford University
- Occupation: Director Education for All Global Monitoring Report
- Years active: 30
- Known for: Education Policy, Comparative Education

Aaron Benavot is a global education policy analyst currently working as the director of Education for All Global Monitoring Report.

== Professional career ==
After completing his doctorate from Stanford University in 1986, Benavot joined University of Georgia as an assistant professor in sociology. In 1990, he moved to the Hebrew University of Jerusalem where he remained until 2007. Benavot then joined School of Education at the University at Albany, SUNY, New York. In 2007, he was elected to the board of directors at the Comparative and International Education Society (CIES).

Benavot has served as co-editor of the Comparative Education Review from 2009 to 2012 and currently serves on the advisory boards of number of journals including Revista Latinoamericana de Educación Comparada, Mediterranean Journal of Educational Studies, Revista de Educación, and Innovation-The European Journal of Social Science Research.

Benavot has also worked as a Senior Policy Analyst for the UNESCO Education for All Global Monitoring Report between 2005 and 2009. In 2014, he joined the report team as the director.

== Titles and awards ==
- 2004 – Selected as Member, College of Fellows, International Bureau of Education
- 1997 – Recipient, George Bereday Award for best article in Comparative Education Review
- 1990 – Recipient of Yigal Allon National Fellowship (Israel)
- 1989 – Recipient of National Academy of Education Spencer Fellowship (USA)
- 1989 – Selected as Research Fellow, Institute of Behavioral Research, University of Georgia
- 1982 – Recipient of Free University of Berlin Exchange Scholarship, West Germany

== Notable works ==
- Benavot, A. (1983). The rise and decline of vocational education. Sociology of Education, 56, 63–76.
- Benavot, A. and P. Riddle (1988). The expansion of primary education 1870-1940: Trends and issues. Sociology of Education, 61, 190–210.
- Benavot, A. (1989). Education, gender, and economic development: A cross-national study. Sociology of Education, 62, 14–32.
- Benavot, A., Y-K Cha, D. Kamens, J. Meyer and S-Y Wong (1991). Knowledge for the masses: World models and national curricula: 1920–1987. American Sociological Review, 56, 85–100.
- Benavot, A. (1992). Curricular content, educational expansion and economic growth. Comparative Education Review, 36, 150–174.
- Benavot, A. (1996). Education and political democratization: A cross-national and longitudinal study. Comparative Education Review, 40, 377–403.
- Benavot, A. and L. Gad (2004). Actual instructional time in African primary schools: Factors that reduce school quality in developing countries. Prospects, 34, 291–310.
- Benavot, A., J. Resnik and J. Corrales (2006). Global educational expansion: Historical legacies and political obstacles. Cambridge, MA: American Academy of Arts and Sciences.
- Benavot, A. and E. Tanner (2007). The growth of national learning assessments in the world, 1995–2006. Background paper for the EFA global monitoring report: Education for All by 2015: Will We Make It? Paris: UNESCO.
- Benavot, A. and C. Braslavsky (Eds). (2007). School knowledge in comparative and historical perspective: Changing curricula in primary and secondary education. Hong Kong: Comparative Education Research Centre, University of Hong Kong.
- Benavot, A. (2008). "The organization of school knowledge: Official curricula in global perspective." In Julia Resnik (ed.) The production of educational knowledge in the global era. Rotterdam: Sense Publishers. pp. 55–92.
- Benavot, A. (2011). Imagining a transformed UNESCO with learning at its core. International Journal of Educational Development, 31(5), 558–561.
- Benavot, A. (2012). Primary school curricula in Reading and Mathematics in developing countries. Technical Paper No. 8. UNESCO Institute for Statistics, Montreal, Canada.
- Meyer, H-D. and A. Benavot (Eds) (2013). PISA, power, and policy: The emergence of global educational governance. Oxford UK: Symposium Books.
