= The Education of Blacks in the South, 1860–1935 =

1988 history book by James D. Anderson

- Author: James D. Anderson
- Subject: History of American education, African-American history
- Published: 1988 (University of North Carolina Press)
- Pages: 381 pp.
- ISBN: 978-0-8078-4221-8
- OCLC: 17297653

The Education of Blacks in the South, 1860–1935 is a history of African-American education in the American South from the Reconstruction era to the Great Depression. It was written by James D. Anderson and published by the University of North Carolina Press in 1988. The book won awards including the American Educational Research Association 1990 Outstanding Book Award.

Ronald E. Butchart of State University College of New York, Cortland stated that the book "is the first substantial regional study of black education since Henry Allen Bullock's A History of Negro Education in the South" (1967).

Harold D. Woodman of Purdue University described Anderson's historical approach as "sharply revisionist".

== Development ==
Anderson made a PhD thesis published in 1973, and he used it to develop his book. His sources included documents from various individuals and organizations. Organizations included the General Education Board, the Hampton Institute, the Anna T. Jeanes Foundation, the Julius Rosenwald Fund, the Laura Spellman Rockefeller Fund, and the John F. Slater Fund. Individuals whose papers he used included Andrew Carnegie, Alexander Crummell, W.E.B. DuBois, Abraham Flexner, Charles S. Johnson, Robert C. Ogden, George F. Peabody, and Booker T. Washington.

== Content ==
Each chapter focuses on a topic.

Anderson stated that the white community prevented African-Americans from having the proper education that African-Americans sought, as opposed to the idea of African-American culture placing a different emphasis on education than other cultures. Anderson also argued the education style promoted by benefactors from the north and south, the Hampton-Tuskeegee model, was intended to orient black people to labor and make them in an inferior status. Anderson argues that the northern industrialists in particular wanted pliant workers and were the party primarily responsible for the non-liberal, work-oriented curriculum. Joe M. Richardson of Florida State University wrote that the author "clearly demonstrates that blacks played a larger role in their own education than generally thought".

The author discussed how differing groups had different visions for the purpose of educating African-Americans in the third chapter, "Education and the Race Problem in the New South: The Struggle for Ideological Hegemony."

Woodman argued that the author at times takes the northern industrialists' statements at face value and at times in disbelief, and that the author "cannot fully explain" the reason for said industrialists' putting massive resources into education of African-Americans; Woodman argued that the "patently racist paternalism" from the industrialists influenced Anderson's conclusions.

== Reception ==
Butchart praised the book, stating "This is history of education at its best."

Thomas Dyer of the University of Georgia praised the "clear framework for an understanding" of how the process of educating African-Americans had evolved.

Elizabeth Fox-Genovese of Emory University stated that the book is "powerful" and a "convincing and chilling account", and that "it behooves the rest of us to take it seriously." Fox-Genovese stated that overall the author had a " strong argument" though she criticized the " cursory treatment of the southern planter class".

Joe L. Green of Louisiana State University in Shreveport stated that the book is "carefully researched and documented, intelligently written, and powerful in its message." Green concluded that the work "is an important addition" in its field.

Thomas W. Hanchett of University of North Carolina at Chapel Hill wrote that the book "will be valued by students" of the field; he argued that the author "stumbles sometimes in fitting theory to fact" in some issues.

James E. Newby of Howard University praised the book's third chapter, but criticized it for not mentioning the Blair Education Bill and the Morrill Act of 1890, arguing that the author should have done so based on his previous track record.

Richardson stated that the book "is argumentative but persuasive", "cogently argued", "extensively researched," and "pleasingly written".

Larry E. Rivers of Florida A&M University stated that "This book is clearly written and quite provocative."

Samuel H. Shannon of Tennessee State University wrote that the book is "important" and that the author could more extensively use "a rich vein of sources" by limiting his book's scope, compared to Bullock's book.

Marcia G. Synott of the University of South Carolina wrote that the book is "superior and richly researched".

== See also ==
- History of education in the United States: Bibliography
