= Essays on Education in the Early Republic =

Essays on Education in the Early Republic is a collection of essays edited by Frederick Rudolph and published by Belknap Press in 1966.

Its contents were created in the early United States after the American Revolution. Thoughts upon the Mode of Education proper in the Republic by Benjamin Rush and The Education of Youth in America by Noah Webster are included.

== Reception ==
W. D. Halls, in British Journal of Educational Studies, praised the "unity" in the essays.

Mehdi Nakosteen of the University of Colorado praised the particular arrangement and assortment of the essays. He stated that the book could be improved if it had information on how other early American figures thought of education.

== See also ==
- History of education in the United States: Bibliography
