= Freedmen's Hospital (disambiguation) =

Freedmen's Hospital may refer to any of several hospitals operated by the Freedmen's Bureau in the United States during 1865–1872:

- Freedmen's Hospital in Washington, DC, now Howard University Hospital
  - Freedmen's Hospital in Northwest Washington, DC, its predecessor on the site of the former Campbell General Hospital
- Freedman's Hospital in Augusta, Georgia, a predecessor of Piedmont Augusta Hospital
- Freedmen's Hospital in New Orleans
