= McHatton Home Colony =

Agency of the US federal government

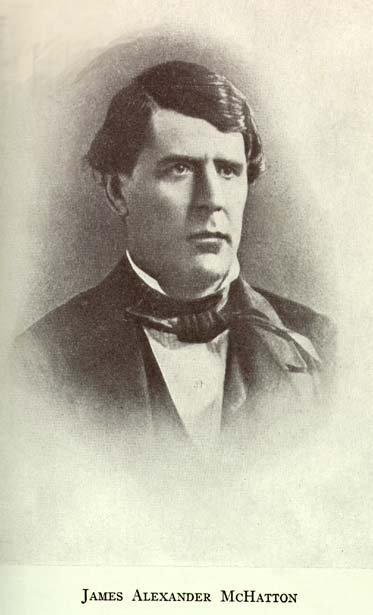
James Alexander McHatton

The McHatton Home Colony was one of four of Home Colonies set up by the Freedmen's Bureau—an agency of the Federal government with a mission to protect the rights of freed blacks—following Union occupation in Louisiana as a transitionary solution to the changing dynamics in the Southern labor force due to the discontinuation of unfree labor. These Home Colonies were all formerly plantations and were confiscated by Union forces for this purpose. In 1864, home colonies in Louisiana comprised 9.650 acres and cared for 1,902 dependents. The McHatton Home Colony is named after James Alexander McHatton.

“In these establishments, labor is forced, and none can avoid it unless they are physically unable to perform it.” Yet, the McHatton home colony struggled to find work for much of its population with only “58 out of 625 residents [being] employed in October 1865”; the cost of caring for the indigent resulted in $24,297 in 1866 dollars—$439,350.77 when adjusted to 2022 dollars.

The Home colonies were not received well by white Southerners; The Bureau and its programs such as the home colonies were almost “universally opposed” by the southern press and the “disposition of the old slaveholders [was] to have this Bureau discontinued.”

The life of a freed person at McHatton would have been marginally better than life on the plantation as they provided a foundation of benefits and protections to freed people including medical care, rations, clothing, housing and wages for work.

This was a short experiment; The home colonies ceased operation in Louisiana in 1866 with the Freedmen's Bureau becoming completely inactive in the state by 1868.

The land that constituted the McHatton Home Colony would eventually become Louisiana State University and likely would have sat along Fieldhouse Drive, which sits on a ridge that acted as natural levee.

The university has done little to publicly acknowledge its physical location's role with slavery or the people enslaved on its grounds.
