= Mediterranean Journal of Educational Studies =

The Mediterranean Journal of Educational Studies is a biannual open source refereed international journal with a regional focus. It features educational research carried out in Mediterranean countries, as well as educational studies related to the diaspora of Mediterranean people worldwide. The first issue of the MJES was published in 1996 and is now available free of charge.

The journal offers a forum for theoretical debate, historical and comparative studies, research and project reports, thus facilitating dialogue in a region which has strong and varied educational traditions. There is a strong international dimension to this dialogue, given the profile of the Mediterranean in the configuration of the new world order, and the presence of Mediterranean peoples in Europe, North America and elsewhere.

The MJES is of interest to scholars, researchers and practitioners in the following fields: comparative education, foundation disciplines in education, education policy analysis, Mediterranean studies, cultural and post-colonial studies, Southern European and area studies, intercultural education, peace education, and migrant studies.

Georges Duby of the Académie Française, in the inaugural issue of the MJES, Vol.1 No.1, 1996, wrote:

"For centuries, the Mediterranean has been a fertile meeting place for diverse civilisations. But it is also a fractured space, marked by violent confrontations and conflict...It is evident that the facing up to and resolution of these conflicts depends primarily on mutual understanding and a spirit of tolerance, both of which are promoted by education. This is why I enthusiastically support the launch of the MJES. It is particularly promising that the home of this journal is Malta, that fertile crossroads in the region."

== Sources ==
As of this edit, this article uses content from "MJES Journal", which is licensed in a way that permits reuse under the Creative Commons Attribution-ShareAlike 3.0 Unported License, but not under the GFDL. All relevant terms must be followed.
