= Leedell Wallace Neyland =

Professor, author, dean at Florida A&M University

Leedell Wallace Neyland (August 4, 1921 - June 6, 2020) was an educator and author in Florida. He was a professor emeritus of history, provost, and dean at Florida A&M University where he joined in 1956 and retired in 1991.

He was born in Gloster, Mississippi and served in the U.S. Navy. He was interviewed about his service in a recording kept at the Library of Congress. He graduated from Virginia State University in 1949 and earned his Master's and Phd degrees from New York University. He received a Danforth Teachers Grant.

He worked at Grambling State University in Louisiana and then as dean of Leland College in Baker, Louisiana before moving on to Elizabeth City State University in North Carolina. He later worked at Florida A&M as a professor, provost, and dean.

He wrote papers on various subjects including teaching Black history in schools, Florida A&M's business school, and Black land grant colleges and their role in agriculture and home economics.

He wrote a novel about a fire at a Natchez, Mississippi club that he survived, but some 200 others did not.

He advocated for black students to take more college entrance exams in Florida and called for improvements and investments to address educational gaps between white and black students.

He married and had children.

== Writings ==
- The Negro in Louisiana Since 1900: An Economic and Social Study New York University (1958), Phd dissertation
- The History of Florida Agricultural and Mechanical University by Neyland and John W. Riley, University of Florida Press (1963)
- Twelve Black Floridians Florida A&M (1970)
- The History of the Florida State Teachers Association by Gilbert L. Porter and Leedell W. Neyland, National Education Association (1977)
- The History of the Florida Interscholastic Athletic Association, 1932-1968 by Leedell W. Neyland, Matthew H. Estaras, and Wilts C. Alexander, Leedella Educational and Consultant Service (1982)
- Florida Agricultural and Mechanical University: A Centennial History Florida A&M University Foundation (1987)
- Unquenchable Black Fires (1994)
- Florida Agricultural and Mechanical University: Sixteen Years of Excellence with Caring (1985-2001) Florida A & M University Foundation (2001)
