= Peter Uwe Hohendahl =

American literary and intellectual historian

Peter Uwe Hohendahl (born 1936) is an American literary and intellectual historian and theorist. He served as the Jacob Gould Schurman Professor of German Studies at Cornell University, where he is now a professor emeritus.

== Career ==
Hohendahl's early work focused on methodological questions in the field of sociology of literature. His first book, influenced by the early Lukacs and Adorno, uses a thematic approach to explore the impact of a modern industrial society on the structure of Expressionist drama. During the 1970s his research is preoccupied with the public function of literary criticism. Hohendahl explores the structure of the literary public sphere and the role of literary criticism in modern society. The theory of the public sphere (Habermas) allowed him to theorize the link between the literary and the socio-political sphere. His work on the reception of the poet Gottfried Benn can be seen as part of this approach, which shifts the focus from the text to its public reception. In his second major project Hohendahl broadens his focus by investigating the institutional elements of 19th-century German literature, including literary criticism, the emergence of literary history, the formation of the literary canon, the conception of a national literary tradition, and the changing structure of the reading public.

During the 1990s Hohendahl's research shifts from historical and methodological to theoretical problems. The writings of the Frankfurt School, especially the work of Theodor W. Adorno, becomes the center. This work foregrounds Adorno's cultural criticism, especially his engagement with European literature and aesthetic theory. Adorno's aesthetic theory becomes the focus of Hohendahl's second Adorno monograph. In this study Hohendahl emphasizes the radical nature of Adorno's theory, going beyond the standard claim of aesthetic autonomy. Adorno's interest in the connection between formal and social structures can be found in Hohendahl's renewed engagement with German modernism, especially in his work on Ernst Jünger.

Hohendahl's later writings reflect his persistent interest in two areas, the history and future of higher education, both in the United States and Germany, and the relevance of political theory for the formation of the cultural sphere. In several essays Hohendahl interrogates the status and role of the American research university. Closely connected to these interventions is his work on the development and the future of German Studies (Germanistik) in the US. Because of this involvement, Hohendahl became the leading co-editor of the history of German Studies in the US, published by the Modern Language Association. Hohendahl's work on German conservatism focuses on Leo Strauss and Carl Schmitt. Hohendahl considers Carl Schmitt's reception in the US a serious challenge for the development of a democratic culture. His analysis highlights Schmitt's role in the political discourse of post-war Germany and his significant impact on the American discussion of European colonialism and its military consequences.

== Works ==
=== Books ===
- Das Bild der bürgerlichen Welt im expressionistischen Drama (Heidelberg: Winter, 1967).
- Literaturkritik und Öffentlichkeit (Munich: Piper, 1974).
- Der europäische Roman der Empfindsamkeit (Wiesbaden: Athenaion, 1977).
- The Institution of Criticism (Ithaca and London: Cornell University Press, 1982).
- Literarische Kultur im Zeitalter des Liberalismus, 1830–1870 (Munich: C. H. Beck, 1985).
- Building a National Literature: The Case of Germany, 1830–1870 (Ithaca and London: Cornell University Press, 1989).
- Reappraisals: Shifting Alignments in Postwar Critical Theory (Ithaca and London: Cornell University Press, 1991).
- Geschichte, Opposition, Subversion. Studien zur Literatur des 19. Jahrhunderts (Köln: Böhlau Verlag, 1993)
- Prismatic Thought: Theodor W. Adorno (Lincoln and London: University of Nebraska Press, 1995).
- Öffentlichkeit: Geschichte eines kritischen Begriffs, P. U. Hohendahl, co-authored with R. A. Berman, K. Kenkel and A. Strum (Stuttgart: Metzler, 2000).
- Heinrich Heine: Europäischer Schriftsteller und Intellektueller (Berlin: Erich Schmidt Verlag, 2008).
- Erfundene Welten: Relektüren zu Form und Zeitstruktur in Ernst Jüngers erzählender Prosa (Munich: Wilhelm Fink Verlag, 2013)
- The Fleeting Promise of Art. Adorno's Aesthetic Theory Revisited (Ithaca and London: Cornell University Press, 2013).
- Perilous Futures. On Carl Schmitt's Late Work (Ithaca and London: Cornell University Press, 2018).

=== Textbooks and essay volumes ===
- Sozialgeschichte und Wirkungsästhetik, Dokumente zur empirischen und marxistischen Rezeptionsforschung (Frankfurt: Fischer-Athenäum, 1974) [Editor; Introduction, Bibliography].
- Literatur und Literaturtheorie in der DDR (Frankfurt: Suhrkamp, 1976) [Co-editor and Contributor].
- Literatur der DDR in den siebziger Jahren (Frankfurt: Suhrkamp, 1983) [Coeditor and Contributor].
- Geschichte der deutschen Literaturkritik (Stuttgart: Metzler, 1985) [Editor and Contributor].
- A History of German Literary Criticism, 1730–1980 (Lincoln: University of Nebraska Press, 1988) [Editor and Contributor].
- Heinrich Heine and the Occident: Multiple Identities, Multiple Receptions, ed. P. U. Hohendahl and S. L. Gilman (Lincoln and London: University of Nebraska Press, 1991).
- Kulturwissenschaften Cultural Studies. Beiträge zur Erprobung eines umstrittenen literaturwissenschaftlichen Paradigmas (Berlin: Weidler Buchverlag, 2001) [Co-editor and Contributor].
- Critical Theory: Current State and Future Prospects (New York: Berghahn Books, 2001) [Co-editor and Contributor].
- Patriotism, Cosmopolitanism, and National Culture. Public Culture in Hamburg 1700–1933 (Amsterdam/New York: Rodopi, 2003) [Editor, Introduction].
- German Studies in the United States. A Historical Handbook (New York: MLA, 2003) [Editor and Contributor].
- Solitäre und Netzwerker. Akteure des kulturpolitischen Konservativismus nach 1945 in den Westzonen Deutschlands (Essen: Klartext 2009) [Coeditor and Contributor].
- Perspektiven konservativen Denkens, Deutschland und die Vereinigten Staaten nach 1945 (Bern: Peter Lang, 2012) [Co-editor and Contributor].
- Herausforderungen des Realismus: Theodor Fontanes Gesellschaftsromane (Freiburg: Rombach 2018) [Coeditor and Contributor].

=== Editions ===
- Gottfried Benn - Wirkung wider Willen (Frankfurt: Athenäum, 1971) [Editor, Introduction, Commentary].
- Literaturkritik. Eine Textdokumentation zur Geschichte einer literarischen Gattung, Vol. 4, 1848–1870 (Vaduz: Topos, 1984) [Editor, Introduction].

=== Articles and book chapters ===
1. "Der Literaturkritiker Adorno im Kontext der Literaturkritik der Nachkriegszeit," in Perspektiven der Literaturvermittlung, ed. Stefan Neuhaus/Oliver Ruf (Innsbruck: StudienVerlag, 2011), 221–231.
2. "Progress Revisited: Adorno's Dialogue with Augustine, Kant, and Benjamin," in Critical Inquiry, 40:1 (2013), 242–260.
3. "Integration and Critique: The Presence of Hegel in Adorno's Aesthetic Theory," Telos 174 (Spring 2016), 33–53.
4. "Aesthetic Theory as Social Theory," in A Companion to Adorno, ed. Peter E. Gordon, Espen Hammer, and Max Pensky, (Hoboken, Wiley), 413–426.
