= Managers of Virtue =

Book by David Tyack

- Author: David Tyack, Elisabeth Hansot
- Subject: History of education
- Published: 1982 (Basic Books)
- Pages: 312 pp
- ISBN: 9780465043743

Managers of Virtue: Public School Leadership in America, 1820–1980 is a history book by David Tyack and Elisabeth Hansot. Its first two sections discuss American educational leadership in the common school period and the Progressive Era, and its last part discusses the subsequent decline in school leader authority and public confidence.
