= History of Education Society =

- Abbreviation: HES
- Formation: 1960; 65 years ago
- President: Adrea Lawrence
- Vice-President and President-Elect: Linda Perkins
- Website: www.historyofeducation.org

The History of Education Society is an "international scholarly society devoted to promoting and teaching the history of education across institutions." The Society was founded in 1960. Its journal is the History of Education Quarterly.

== History ==
The History of Education Society emerged as the field of the history of education began to coalesce. Early work in the field began in the late 1800s, but became an academic discipline in the early 1900s with the work of Ellwood Patterson Cubberley and Paul Monroe. Teachers in training were then taught the institutional history of American public school education, particularly as "an inevitable outcome of consensus forged by a democratic society". In 1948, the National Society of College Teachers of Education began a History of Education Section. The Section published the History of Education Journal. Scholars argued over the field's aims throughout the 1950s. The Ford Foundation formed a Committee on the Role of Education in American History in 1957 to create a history of education from a history of public schools, an effort to make the field more scholarly. The History of Education Society was founded as an independent organization in 1960, succeeding the Section. With its creation came legitimacy for the field as academic study. The society was influenced by revisionism in the 1970s, which encouraged its historians to debate American public education's societal and individual roles in the society's journal and annual meetings. Towards the end of the century, the education history field grew to include histories of the family, media, religion, race, ethnicity, class, gender, and educational opportunity.

In 1961, the History of Education Quarterly replaced the History of Education Journal and published the society's work. The journal operated out of the University of Pittsburgh with Ryland W. Crary as its editor and later moved to New York University, Indiana University, Slippery Rock University, the University of Illinois and the University of Washington. Other editors have included William J. Reese.

In 1988, the society affiliated with the International Standing Conference for the History of Education, which hosts annual meetings for the field around the world in conjunction with regional history of education societies.

The History of Education Society holds its annual conferences in every region of the United States. The Society also hosts several awards for scholars.
