= History of Education Quarterly =

US peer-reviewed academic journal

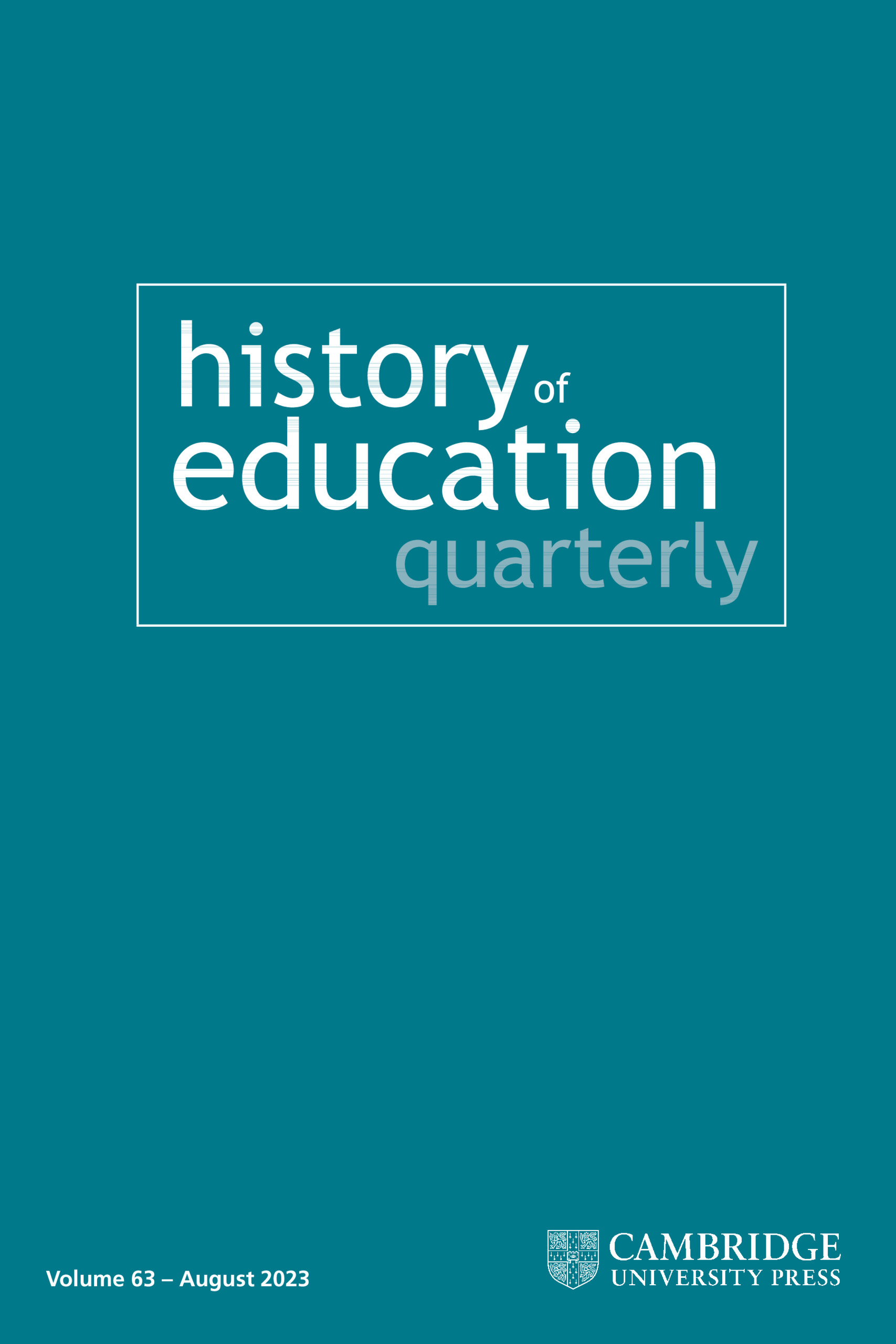
- Discipline: History of education
- Language: English
- Edited by: A.J. Angulo, Jack Schneider

Publication details
- Former name(s): History of Education Journal
- History: 1949–present
- Publisher: Cambridge University Press, on behalf of the History of Education Society
- Frequency: Quarterly

Standard abbreviations
- ISO 4: Hist. Educ. Q.

Indexing
- ISSN: 0018-2680 (print); 1748-5959 (web)
- LCCN: 63024253
- JSTOR: 00182680
- OCLC no.: 1752162

Links
- Journal homepage; Online access; Online archive

History of Education Quarterly is a quarterly peer-reviewed academic journal covering the history of education. It is published by Cambridge University Press on behalf of the History of Education Society and was established in 1949 as the History of Education Journal, obtaining its current name in 1961. At the time, Ryland W. Crary (University of Pittsburgh) became the editor-in-chief. He was succeeded by Henry J. Perkinson (New York University, 1969–1972); Paul H. Mattingly (New York University, 1972–1986) and James McLachlan (New York University, co-editor 1984–1986); Edward McClellan (Indiana University, 1986–1988, 1996–1998); William J. Reese (Indiana University, 1988–1996); Richard J. Altenbaugh (Slippery Rock University, 1998–2007); James D. Anderson (University of Illinois Urbana-Champaign, 2007–2015), Yoon Pak (University of Illinois Urbana-Champaign, co-editor 2007–2015), and Christopher Span (University of Illinois Urbana-Champaign, co-editor 2007–2015); Nancy Beadie (University of Washington, 2015–2020) and Joy Williamson-Lott (University of Washington, 2015–2020). The current co-editors are AJ Angulo (University of Massachusetts Lowell) and Jack Schneider (University of Massachusetts Amherst).

== Abstracting and indexing ==
The journal is abstracted and indexed in the following bibliographic databases:

- EBSCO databases
- Emerging Sources Citation Index
- ERIC
- International Bibliography of Periodical Literature
- MLA International Bibliography
- Research into Higher Education Abstracts
- Scopus
