= Roger Geiger =

American educational historian (born 1943)

Roger L. Geiger (born 1943) is an American scholar of higher education in the United States. He is Distinguished Professor of Higher Education Emeritus at Pennsylvania State University.

== Education and career ==
Geiger graduated from the University of Michigan with a Bachelor of Arts with a major in English in 1964, a Master of Arts in history in 1966, and a Doctor of Philosophy in history in 1972: Diss. "The Development of French Sociology, 1870-1905.

He was an instructor in history at Northern Michigan University from 1966 to 1968 and at the University of Michigan from 1972 to 1974. From 1974 to 1987 he conducted researched in comparative and private higher education at Yale University's Institution for Social and Policy Studies. He joined the faculty of Pennsylvania State University in 1987 and retired in 2016. He has published 8 single-authored books, many edited volumes, and more than 150 articles. He edited the History of Higher Education Annual (1993-2017).

In comparative higher education Geiger published Private Sectors (1986). His next three volumes analyzed the development of American research universities in the twentieth century: in To Advance Knowledge (1986) foundations promoted basic science; in Research and Relevant Knowledge (1993) federal agencies supported research relevant to their missions; and Knowledge and Money (2004) encompassed university-industry research ties. This last theme was expanded in Tapping the Riches of Science (2008). Geiger then published in two volumes the most thorough history of American higher education (2015 & 2019). The first volume, Learning and Culture, was named outstanding publication of 2015 by the Postsecondary Division of the American Educational Research Association. Geiger’s papers are deposited at the Pennsylvania State University Archives and Special Collections, including a Curriculum Vitae and “Career Outline, 1963-2023.”

== Books ==
- Private Sectors in Higher Education: Structure, function, and Change in Eight Countries (1986, University of Michigan Press)
- To Advance Knowledge: The Growth of American Research Universities, 1900-1940. Routledge. 29 September 2017. ISBN 9781351471817. (1st edition, 1986, Oxford University Press)
- Research and Relevant Knowledge: American Research Universities Since World War II. Routledge. 29 September 2017. ISBN 9781351493451. (1st edition, 1993, Oxford University Press)
- Knowledge and Money: Research Universities and the Paradox of the Marketplace. Stanford University Press. 2004. ISBN 9780804749268.
- with Creso M. Sá: Tapping the Riches of Science: Universities and the Promise of Economic Growth. Harvard University Press. 2008. ISBN 9780674031289.
- The History of American Higher Education: Learning and Culture from the Founding to World War II. Princeton University Press. 2015. ISBN 9780691173061.
- American Higher Education Since World War II: A History, 2019, Princeton University Press.
