= Henry Allen Bullock =

American historian and sociologist

Dr. Henry Allen Bullock
- Born: May 2, 1906; Tarboro, North Carolina, US
- Died: February 8, 1973 (aged 66); Houston, Texas, US
- Education: Virginia Union University, University of Michigan
- Scientific career
- Workplaces: North Carolina Agricultural and Technical State University, Prairie View A&M, Dillard University, Texas Southern University, University of Texas at Austin

Henry Allen Bullock (May 2, 1906 – February 8, 1973) was an American historian and sociologist, the first African American to win the Bancroft Prize, and the first Black professor to be appointed to the faculty of arts and sciences at the University of Texas at Austin.

== Personal life ==
Henry Allen Bullock was born on May 2, 1906, in Tarboro, North Carolina as the son of Jesse Bullock and Aurelia Christmas.

=== Family ===
Henry Allen Bullock became a father at age 18. His first documented son, John Francine Tolliver, was born October 30, 1924 in Tarboro, North Carolina. Bullock's eldest daughter, Marjorie Louise Beale, was born on September 19, 1927 in Norfolk, Virginia. James Leroy Newton, Bullock's second son, was born March 9, 1929 in Edgecombe County, North Carolina.

Henry Allen Bullock married Violet Harriet Bailey on January 25, 1930. Their son, Henry Allen Bullock Jr., was born on January 7, 1931 in Prairie View, Texas. Bullock later married Merle Louise Anderson on May 24, 1938. Merle gave birth to their two children: Rodney Bullock and Merle Bullock.

=== Death ===
Henry Allen Bullock died on February 8, 1973, at the age of 66 due to a ruptured left ventricle. His funeral was held on February 12, 1973, in Houston, Texas. He was laid to rest in the Paradise South Cemetery in Pearland, Texas.

== Education ==
He graduated from Virginia Union University with a B.A in social sciences and Latin classics in 1928, from the University of Michigan with an M.A. in sociology and comparative psychology in 1929 and with a Ph.D. in sociology in 1942. He was an Earhardt Foundation fellow at the University of Michigan.

== Career ==
He taught at North Carolina Agricultural and Technical State University in 1929–30, at Prairie View A&M, from 1930 to 1949, at Dillard University from 1949 to 1950, at Texas Southern University from 1950 to 1969. He became the first African American to serve on the faculty of arts and sciences at the University of Texas at Austin, where he served from 1969 to 1971. He was the Chairman of Graduate Research at Texas Southern University. He was also the president of CAPRA Inc. and a member of the Societe Internationale De Criminologie.

He retired in 1971 to his home in Houston, Texas.

== Research ==
Dr. Bullock contributed to the fields of sociology and criminology during his lifetime. Just a few of his contributions to his degree field of sociology are Spatial Aspect of the Differential Birth Rate, A Comparison of the Academic Achievements of White and Negro High School Graduates, The Expansion of Negro Suffrage in Texas, Negro Higher and Professional Education in Texas, and The Availability of Education in the Texas Negro Separate School. His research focused on the acknowledgement of the hardships that Black Americans face in education and in the legal system. However, his most cited research studies are in the field of Criminology.

=== Research in criminology ===
He wrote two studies in the subject of criminology. His study Significance of the Racial Factor in the Length of Prison Sentences discussed the idea that racial discrimination existed in criminal law which leads to a difference in criminal sentencing. He conducted his research study on 3,644 inmates at the Texas State Prison in Huntsville, Texas. His study found that factors of racial discrimination were found to significantly affect the length of prison time given to black individuals compared to their white counterparts.

His other study in criminology is Urban Homicide in Theory and Fact. He explores the theory that specific areas in any city are more likely to draw in individuals who, during their personal time, are more likely to commit an act of homicide or other criminal act. He conducted his research in the city of Houston, Texas in collaboration with the City Police Department, he received and reviewed over 500 cases of homicide from 1945 to 1949 but only used a sample of 489 cases after deciding that certain cases did not fit the criteria of the study. The study found that there was support for the theory that certain areas of socio-economic conditions and specific urban segregation did have higher rates of homicide compared to other areas that did not share those characteristics.

== Community contributions ==
Bullock testified for African American history to be included in Texas history textbooks and served on the Texas advisory committee to the U.S. Civil Rights Commission. He was also the author of a regular column for the Houston Informer. In addition to this, he was a member of the Mayor's Commission on Crime and Delinquency for the City of Houston, Texas. Bullock also served as a delegate for the United States to the International Congress of Criminology in London in 1955. He also presented at numerous conferences and schools sharing his research to other sociologists, students, and educators. Bullock's research on the economic status of the black population in Houston, Texas was featured in Time Magazine in August 1956.

== Awards ==
In 1968, Bullock won the Bancroft Prize from Columbia University for his work, A History of Negro Education in the South.

== Works ==
- Urban Homicide in Theory and Fact
- A History of Negro Education in the South
- A Comparison of the Academic Achievements of White and Negro High School Graduates
- Significance of the Racial Factor in the Length of Prison Sentences
- Racial Attitudes and the Employment of Negroes
- The Black College and the New Black Awareness
- The Prediction of Dropout Behavior Among Urban Negro Boys
- Pathways to the Houston Negro Market
- The Texas Negro family : The Status of its Socio-economic Organization
