= William J. Reese (historian) =

American education historian

Academic background
- Education: Wilkes College; Bowling Green State University; University of Wisconsin–Madison

Academic work
- Discipline: History of education
- Institutions: University of Wisconsin–Madison

William J. Reese is the Carl F. Kaestle Wisconsin Alumni Research Foundation (WARF) Professor of Educational Policy Studies and History at the University of Wisconsin–Madison. He received a Vilas Distinguished Achievement professorship in May 2015.
