= Taixue =

Ancient Chinese academy

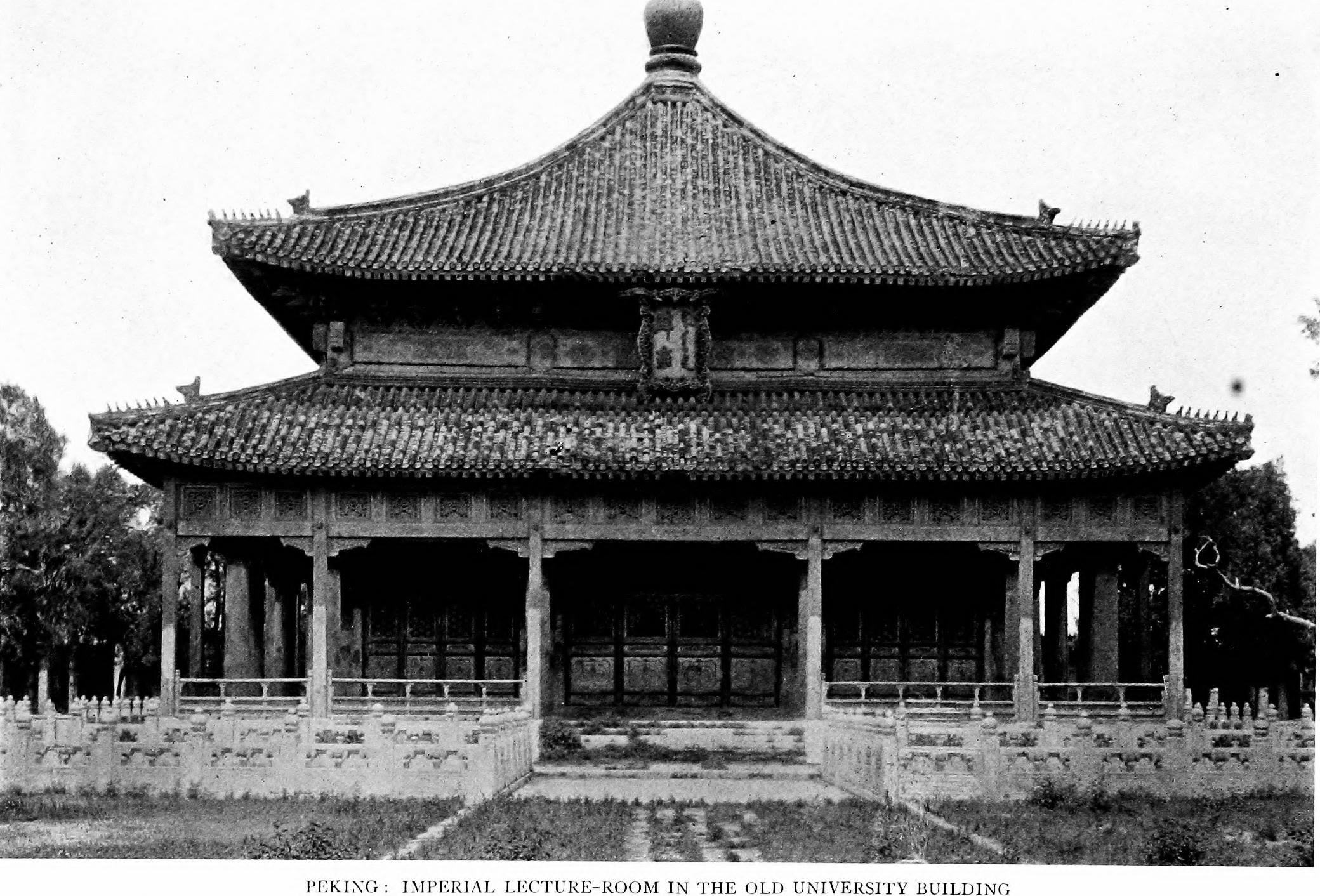
- 1907 picture of the Qing Hanlin Academy in Beijing, a successor institution to the Taixue of Chang'an, Luoyang, Kaifeng, and Hangzhou
- Traditional Chinese: 太學
- Simplified Chinese: 太学
- Literal meaning: Supreme School
Transcriptions
Standard Mandarin
- Hanyu Pinyin: Taixue
- Wade–Giles: Tai-shueh

The Taixue, variously translated as the Imperial Academy, Imperial School, Imperial University, or Central University, was the highest rank of educational establishment in Ancient China created during the Han dynasty. The Sui dynasty instituted major reforms, giving the imperial academy a greater administrative role and renaming it the Guozijian. As the Guozijian, the institution was maintained by successive dynasties until it was finally abolished in 1905 near the end of the Qing dynasty.

Taixue taught Confucianism and Chinese literature among other things for high level civil service posts, although a civil service system based upon competitive examination rather than recommendation was not introduced until the Sui and did not become a mature system until the Song dynasty (960–1279).

== Han Taixue ==
The university held 30,000 students and academicians during the 2nd century. This provided the Han dynasty with well-educated bureaucrats to fill civil service posts in the imperial government. The first nationwide government school system in China was established in 3 AD under Emperor Ping of Han, with the Taixue located in the capital of Chang'an and local schools established in the prefectures and in the main cities of the smaller counties.

== Song Taixue ==
The Kaifeng Taixue was created under the Northern Song as part of the Qingli Reforms to provide education to the children of commoners and low-ranking officials. It was the only institution that survived the reversal of the reforms.

Wang Anshi's New Policies included a major reform of education, including a greater emphasis on the Confucian classics at the expense of poetry and the reorganisation of the examination system. The university was expanded from 200 students in 1051 to 2,400 students in 1079 and was restructured into three halls: Outer, Inner and Upper. The students proceeded from one to another and upon graduation became qualified for the position of official.

The Three Hall system survived the partial rollback of the New Policies and was used as a template for prefectural schools. The university sat at the pinnacle of the hierarchical system with students advancing from level to level and from school to school based on examinations as well as teachers' recommendations. In 1106 a new "eight virtues" advancement path was introduced, with students recommended for their virtuous conduct spending one year in the prefectural school and then proceeding to the Upper Hall of the university.

The university had 3,800 students in 1103, of whom 3,000 were in the Outer Hall (which had a separate campus to the south of the capital), 600 in the Inner Hall, and 200 in the Upper Hall, with ten to sixty men graduating each year.

After the fall of the Northern Song, the university was refounded in 1142 in Lin'an (now Hangzhou), the new capital, with a student quota of 300, which grew to 1,000 by 1148. Throughout Southern Song, the students of the Imperial University, sometimes joined by the students of other capital schools, became one of the most visible and influential political groups. They often took to the streets protesting various domestic or foreign policy issues. Sometimes their protests led to dismissals of prefects and even chief councilors. Attendance at the university greatly increased the chance of achieving the jinshi degree on the imperial exams—a success rate of about 1:4 against a rate closer to 1:16 for scholars who had merely recently succeeded at the prefectural exams—such that in 1202 about 37,000 applicants attended the entrance test for the university's 200 available positions.

== See also ==
- Academies (Shuyuan)
- Ancient higher-learning institutions
- Shang Xiang
- Guozijian
