= Shang Xiang =

Former school in China

Shang Xiang (Chinese: 上庠; pinyin: shàng xiáng; Wade–Giles: Shang Hsiang) was a school founded in the Yu Shun (虞舜) era in China. Shun (2257 BCE–2208 BCE), the Emperor of the Kingdom of Yu (虞, or 有虞/Youyu), founded two schools. One was Shang Xiang (shang (上), means up, high), and the other one was Xia Xiang (下庠, xia (下) means down, low). Shang Xiang was a place to educate noble youth. Teachers at Shang Xiang were generally erudite, elder and noble persons.

The original meaning of Xiang (庠) is provide for (養), and Xiang, including Shang Xiang and Xia Xiang, were initially places to provide for the aged persons, and then became places for aged persons with their knowledge and experiences to teach youth.

Shang Xiang is classified as a kind of Guo Xue (國學), meaning the National School in capital city, which is the imperial central school, the nation's supreme school in China, in contrast with regional schools. Cheng Jun (成均) is also a kind of ancient institution with educational function in the Five Emperors eras before Shang Xiang as recorded in literature. The imperial school was called Dong Xu (東序, literally eastern school) in the Xia dynasty, while Xi Xu (西序, western school) was equivalent to Xia Xiang. In the Shang dynasty the upper school was You Xue (右學, literally right school) and the lower school was Zuo Xue (左學, left school). The imperial central school was named Taixue in Han dynasty. From Sui dynasty to Qing dynasty it was named Guozijian.

Shang Xiang was also one of the five imperial schools in the capital city of the Zhou dynasty. The other four were: Dong Xu (東序), Cheng Jun (成均), Gu Zong (瞽宗) and Pi Yong (闢雍). Pi Yong, also called Taixue at the time, was a central school, located in a central location, where the Son of Heaven may often lecture and also learn and ask for advisement (承師問道). Dong Xu was an eastern school. Cheng Jun was a southern school. Gu Zong was a western school and it is a music school. Shang Xiang was a northern school. The schools established by vassal states were called Pan Gong (泮宮). The schools in the Zhou dynasty mainly taught the Six Arts: Li (禮, rite), Yue (樂, music), She (射, archery), Yu (禦, charioteering), Shu (書, literature), Shu (數, maths).
