= History of education in ancient Israel and Judah =

Education has been defined as, "teaching and learning specific skills, and also something less tangible, but more profound: the imparting of knowledge, positive judgement and well-developed wisdom. Education has as one of its fundamental aspects the imparting of culture from generation to generation (see socialization)".

While curriculum and texts for schools has been found in other areas of the ancient near east, no direct evidence—either literary or archaeological—exists for schools in ancient Israel. There is no word for school in ancient (biblical) Hebrew, the earliest reference to a "house of study" (bet hammidrash) is found in the mid-Hellenistic period (2nd cent. BC) in the book of Ben Sira (51:23).

However, the writing of the Bible as well as the variety of inscriptional material from ancient Israel testifies to a relatively robust scribal culture that must have existed to create these textual artifacts. The best unambiguous evidence for schools in ancient Israel comes from a few abecedaries and accounting practice texts found at sites such as Izbet Sarta, Tel Zayit, Kadesh Barnea, and Kuntillet ʿAjrud. However, these were probably not schools in the traditional sense but rather an apprenticeship system located in the family.

The total literacy rate of Jews in Israel in the first centuries c.e. was "probably less than 3%". While this may seem very low by today's standards, it was relatively high in the ancient world. If we ignore women (on the ground of their not participating in society), take into consideration children above the age of seven only, forget the far-away farmers and regard literacy of the non-educated people (e.g., one who cannot read the Torah but reads a bulla, that is: pragmatic literacy), then the literacy rate (adult males in the centers), might be even 20%, a high rate in traditional society.

== House of the teacher ==
The institution known as the "be rav" or "bet rabban" (house of the teacher), or as the "be safra" or "bet sefer" (house of the book), is said to have been originated by Ezra' (459 BCE) and his Great Assembly, who provided a public school in Jerusalem to secure the education of fatherless boys of the age of sixteen years and upward. However, the school system did not develop until Joshua ben Gamla (64 CE) the high priest caused public schools to be opened in every town and hamlet for all children above six or seven years of age (Babylonian Talmud, Bava Batra 21a).

== Expense and conduct ==
The expense was borne by the community, and strict discipline was observed. Rav ordered Samuel ben Shilat to deal tenderly with the pupils, to refrain from corporal punishment, or at most to use a shoe-strap in correcting pupils for inattention. A stupid pupil was made monitor until able to grasp the art of learning. Rabbah bar Nahmani fixed the number of pupils at twenty-five for one teacher; if the number was between twenty-five and forty an assistant teacher ("resh dukana") was necessary; and for over forty, two teachers were required.

== Teaching staff ==
Only married men were engaged as teachers.

== Literacy ==
It has been estimated that at least 90 percent of the Jewish population of Roman Palestine in the first centuries CE could merely write their own name or not write and read at all, or that the literacy rate was either about 3 percent or 7.7 percent. The exact literacy rate among male Jews in Roman Palestine was probably between 5 and 10 percent.

Epigraphic evidence documents that a preliminary scribal infrastructure developed over the course of the 10th century BC as state-centralization progressed, followed by a much larger infrastructure during the Neo-Assyrian period under which parts of the biblical texts were composed. Literacy then declined during the period of the exile and slowly re-established itself in the intervening centuries. Some of Israel's earliest teaching material may be reflected in some portions within the Book of Proverbs.

== See also ==
- History of ancient Israel and Judah
- Jewish education
