= Reference work =

Publication to which one can refer for confirmed facts

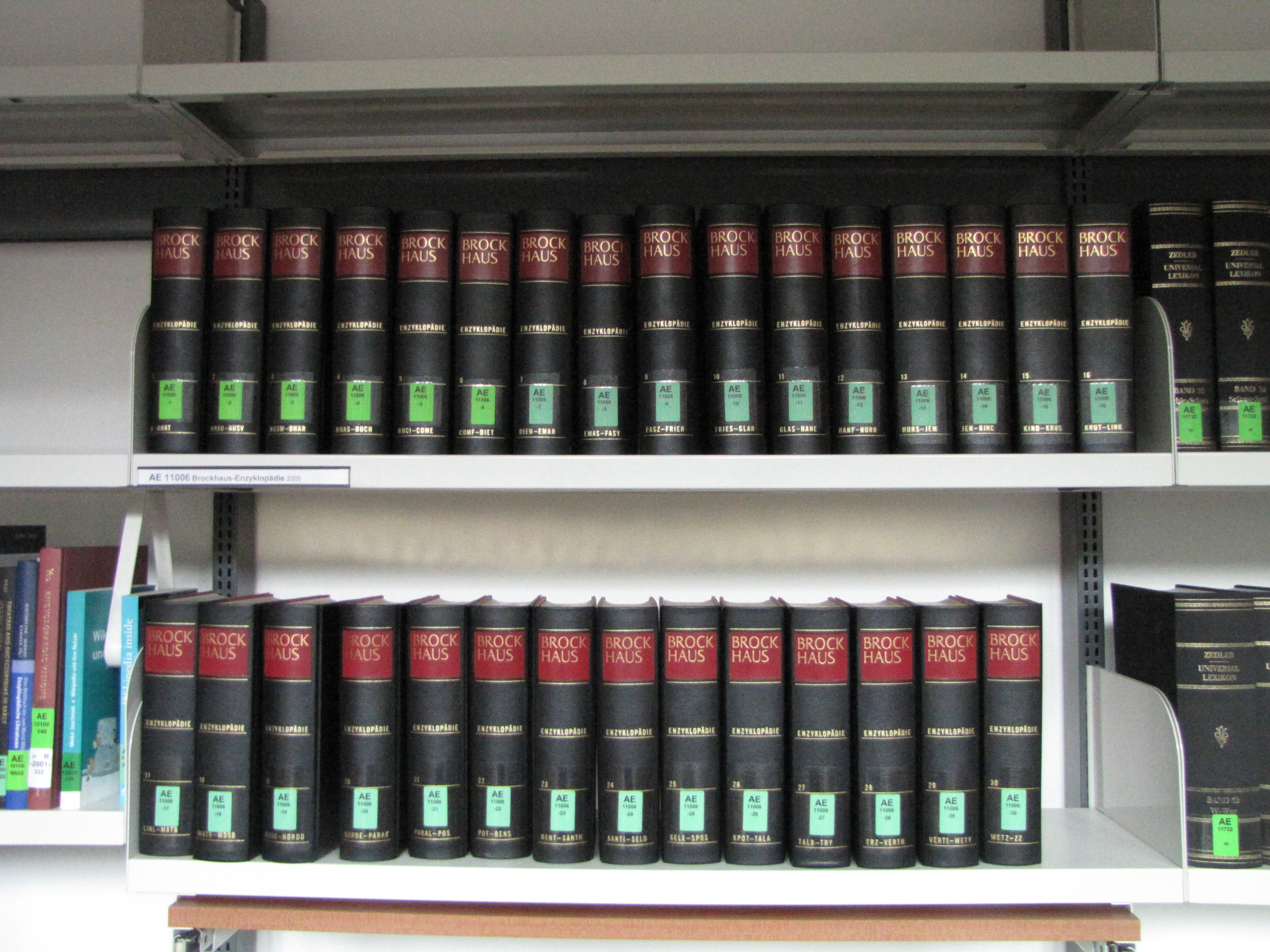
The Brockhaus Enzyklopädie, the best-known traditional reference book in German-speaking countries

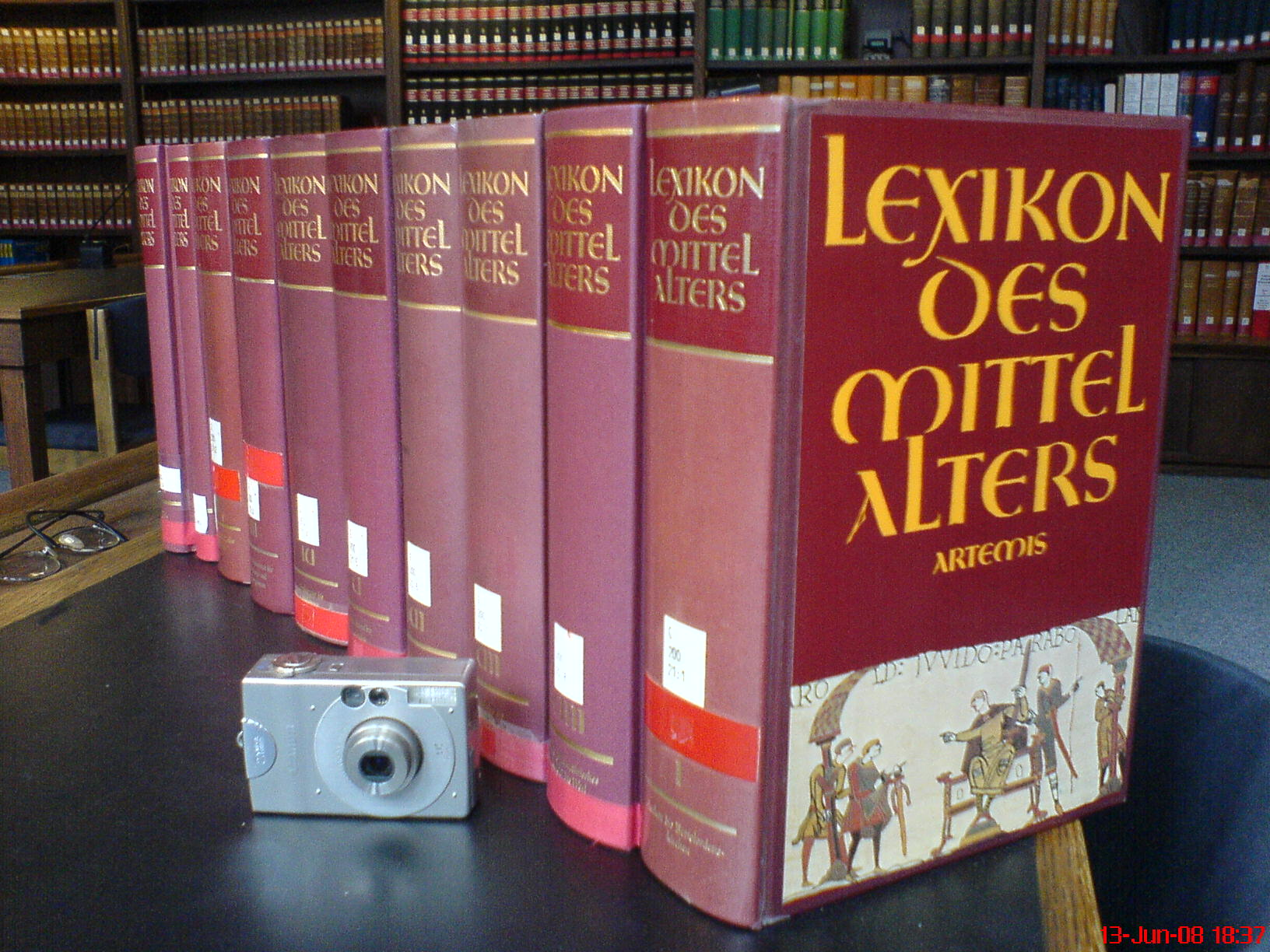
The Lexikon des Mittelalters, a specialised German encyclopedia

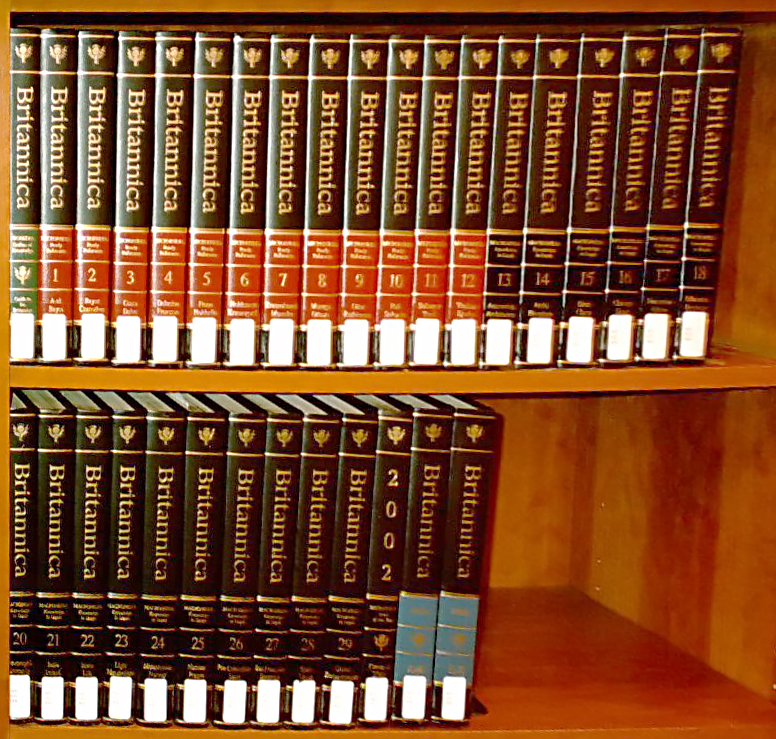
Encyclopædia Britannica, 15th edition: volumes of the Propedia (green), Micropedia (red), Macropedia (black), and 2-volume Index (blue)

A reference work is a document, such as a paper, book, encyclopedia or periodical (or their electronic equivalents, usually available online), to which one can refer for information. The information is intended to be found quickly when needed. Such works are usually referred to for particular pieces of information, rather than being read in its entirety. The writing style used in these works is informative, with the authors avoiding opinions and the use of the first-person perspective, and emphasizing facts.

Indices are a common navigation feature in many types of reference works. Many reference works are put together by a team of contributors whose work is coordinated by one or more editors, rather than by an individual author. Updated editions are usually published as needed, in some cases annually, such as Whitaker's Almanack, and Who's Who.

Reference works include textbooks, almanacs, atlases, bibliographies, biographical sources, catalogs such as library catalogs and art catalogs, concordances, dictionaries, directories such as business directories and telephone directories, discographies, encyclopedias, filmographies, gazetteers, glossaries, handbooks, indices such as bibliographic indices and citation indices, manuals, research guides, thesauruses, and yearbooks. While traditionally printed, reference works are often available in electronic formats, including reference software, CD-ROMs, DVDs, and online access via the Internet. Wikipedia, an online encyclopedia, is both the largest and the most-read reference work in history.

== Library reference book ==
In many public and academic libraries, reference books are not available for borrowing. Reference books may be consulted frequently, such as dictionaries or atlases, or very rarely, like a highly specialized concordance. Because some reference books are in constant demand while others are used so infrequently that replacement would be difficult, they may be kept on-site and made available for photocopying or digital scanning instead of checkout.

== Types of reference works ==
The main types and categories of reference works include:

- Abstracting journal – a published summary of articles, theses, reviews, conference proceedings etc. arranged systematically
- Almanac – an annual publication, listing a set of current, general or specific information about one or multiple subjects
- Annals – concise historical record in which events are arranged chronologically
- Atlas – a collection of maps traditionally been bound into book form
- Bibliography – a systematic list of books and other works such as journal articles on a given subject or which satisfy particular criteria
- Biographical dictionary – an encyclopedic dictionary limited to biographical information
- Books of Quotations – collections of quotations satisfying particular criteria, arranged systematically
- Calendar – a record or a schematic set-up of the days and dates in the months of a specific year
- Chronicle/Chronology – a historical account of events arranged in chronological order
- Compendium – a concise collection of information pertaining to a body of knowledge
- Concordance – an alphabetical list of the principal words used in a book or body of work
- Dictionary – a list of words from one or more languages, systematically arranged and giving meanings, etymologies etc.
- Digest – a summary of information on a particular subject
- Directory – a systematically arranged list of names, addresses, products, etc.
  - Business directory
  - Telephone directory
  - Web directory
- Encyclopedia – a compendium providing summaries of knowledge either from all branches or from a particular field or discipline
- Gazetteer – a geographical dictionary or directory used to provide systematic access to a map or atlas
- Glossary – an alphabetical list of terms in a particular domain of knowledge with the definitions for those terms
- Handbook – a small or portable book intended to provide ready reference
- Index – a publication giving systematic access to a body of knowledge
- Lexicon – a synonym for a dictionary or encyclopaedic dictionary
- List – a published enumeration of a set of items
- Manual – a handbook providing instructions in the use of a particular product
- Phrase book – a collection of ready-made phrases, arranged systematically, usually for a foreign language together with a translation
- Ready reckoner – a printed book or table containing pre-calculated values
- Thematic catalogue – an index used to identify musical compositions through the citation of the opening notes
- Textbook – a reference work containing information about a subject
- Thesaurus – a reference work for finding synonyms and sometimes antonyms of words
- Timetable – a published list of schedules giving times for transportation or other events
- Yearbook – a compendium containing events relating to a specific year

=== Almanac ===
An almanac (historically spelled almanack) is a regularly published listing of a set of current information about one or multiple subjects. It includes information like weather forecasts, farmers' planting dates, tide tables, and other tabular data often arranged according to the calendar. Celestial figures and various statistics are found in almanacs, such as the rising and setting times of the Sun and Moon, dates of eclipses, hours of high and low tides, and religious festivals. The set of events noted in an almanac may be tailored for a specific group of readers, such as farmers, sailors, or astronomers.

=== Annals ===
Annals (Latin: annāles, from annus, "year") are a concise historical record in which events are arranged chronologically, year by year, although the term is also used loosely for any historical record.

=== Atlas ===
An atlas is a collection of maps; it is typically a bundle of maps of Earth or of a continent or region of Earth. Advances in astronomy have also resulted in atlases of the celestial sphere or of other planets.

Atlases have traditionally been bound into book form, but today, many atlases are in multimedia formats. In addition to presenting geographical features and political boundaries, many atlases often feature geopolitical, social, religious, and economic statistics. They also have information about the map and places in it.

=== Bibliography ===
Bibliography (from Ancient Greek: βιβλίον, romanized: biblion, lit. 'book' and -γραφία, -graphía, 'writing') is a word with two different senses. According to English author and scholar of books John Carter, one sense, probably the more common, is a list of books, texts, or full citations for further study or of works consulted by an author (enumerative bibliography).

The other sense is "the study of books as physical objects" and "the systematic description of books as objects" (descriptive bibliography). The second sense as an academic discipline is also known as bibliology to avoid ambiguity (from Ancient Greek: -λογία, romanized: -logía). The first sense is a countable noun, as in "a bibliography", while the second refers to the mass noun "bibliography" as a general concept.

=== Biographical dictionary ===
A biographical dictionary is a type of encyclopedic dictionary limited to biographical information. Many attempt to cover the major personalities of a country (with limitations, such as living persons only, in Who's Who, or deceased people only, in the Dictionary of National Biography). Others are specialized, in that they cover important names in a subject field, such as architecture or engineering.

=== Calendar ===
A calendar is a system of organizing days. This is done by giving names to periods of time, typically days, weeks, months and years. A date is the designation of a single and specific day within such a system. A calendar is also a physical record (often paper) of such a system. A calendar can also mean a list of planned events, such as a court calendar, or a partly or fully chronological list of documents, such as a calendar of wills.

Periods in a calendar (such as years and months) are usually, though not necessarily, synchronized with the cycle of the sun or the moon. The most common type of pre-modern calendar was the lunisolar calendar, a lunar calendar that occasionally adds one intercalary month to remain synchronized with the solar year over the long term.

=== Chronicle ===
A chronicle (Latin: chronica, from Greek χρονικά chroniká, from χρόνος, chrónos – "time") is a historical account of events arranged in chronological order, as in a timeline. Typically, equal weight is given for historically important events and local events, the purpose being the recording of events that occurred, seen from the perspective of the chronicler. A chronicle which traces world history is a universal chronicle. This is in contrast to a narrative or history, in which an author chooses events to interpret and analyze and excludes those the author does not consider important or relevant.

The information sources for chronicles vary. Some are written from the chronicler's direct knowledge, others from witnesses or participants in events, still others are accounts passed down from generation to generation by oral tradition. Some used written material, such as charters, letters, and earlier chronicles. Still others are tales of unknown origin that have mythical status. Copyists also changed chronicles in creative copying, making corrections or in updating or continuing a chronicle with information not available to the original chronicler. Determining the reliability of particular chronicles is important to historians.

=== Compendium ===
A compendium ( compendia or compendiums) is a comprehensive collection of information and analysis pertaining to a body of knowledge. A compendium may concisely summarize a larger work. In most cases, the body of knowledge will concern a specific field of human interest or endeavor (e.g. hydrogeology, logology, ichthyology, phytosociology or myrmecology), while a general encyclopedia can be referred to as a "compendium of all human knowledge". The word compendium arrives from the Latin word compeneri, meaning "to weigh together or balance". The 21st century has seen the rise of democratized, online compendia in various fields.

=== Concordance ===
A concordance is an alphabetical list of the principal words used in a book or body of work, listing every instance of each word with its immediate context. Historically, concordances have been compiled only for works of special importance, such as the Vedas, Bible, Qur'an or the works of Shakespeare, James Joyce or classical Latin and Greek authors, because of the time, difficulty, and expense involved in creating a concordance in the pre-computer era. A concordance is more than an index, with additional material such as commentary, definitions and topical cross-indexing which makes producing one a labor-intensive process even when assisted by computers.

=== Dictionary ===
A dictionary is a listing of words or lexemes—typically base forms—from the lexicon of one or more specific languages, often arranged alphabetically (or by consonantal root for Semitic languages or radical and stroke for logographic languages), which may include information on definitions, usage, etymologies, pronunciations, translation, etc. It is a lexicographical reference that shows inter-relationships among the data.

A broad distinction is made between general and specialized dictionaries. Specialized dictionaries include words in specialist fields, rather than a comprehensive range of words in the language. Lexical items that describe concepts in specific fields are usually called terms instead of words, although there is no consensus whether lexicology and terminology are two different fields of study. In theory, general dictionaries are supposed to be semasiological, mapping word to definition, while specialized dictionaries are supposed to be onomasiological, first identifying concepts and then establishing the terms used to designate them. In practice, the two approaches are used for both types. There are other types of dictionaries that do not fit neatly into the above distinction, for instance bilingual (translation) dictionaries, dictionaries of synonyms (thesauri), and rhyming dictionaries. The word dictionary (unqualified) is usually understood to refer to a general purpose monolingual dictionary.

=== Directories ===
==== Business directory ====
A business directory is a website or printed listing of information which lists businesses within niche-based categories. Businesses can be categorized by niche, location, activity, or size. Business may be compiled either manually or through an automated online search software. Online yellow pages are a type of business directory, as is the traditional phone book.

Some directories include a section for user reviews, comments, and feedback. Business directories in the past would take a printed format but have recently been upgraded to websites due to the advent of the internet.

==== Telephone directory ====
A telephone directory, commonly called a telephone book, telephone address book or phonebook, is a listing of telephone subscribers in a geographical area or subscribers to services provided by the organization that publishes the directory. Its purpose is to allow the telephone number of a subscriber identified by name and address to be found. It may include a 'yellow pages' section that list businesses by type, architects, beauticians, carpenters, etc., or the Yellow pages may be provided as a separate volume. The slogan "Let Your Fingers Do the Walking", introduced by the Bell System, refers to use of Yellow Pages phone books.

The advent of the Internet, search engines, and smartphones in the 21st century greatly reduced the need for a paper phone book. Some communities, such as Seattle and San Francisco, sought to ban their unsolicited distribution as wasteful, unwanted and harmful to the environment.

==== Web directory ====
A web directory or link directory is an online list or catalog of websites. That is, it is a directory on the World Wide Web of (all or part of) the World Wide Web. Historically, directories typically listed entries on people or businesses, and their contact information; such directories are still in use today. A web directory includes entries about websites, including links to those websites, organized into categories and subcategories. Besides a link, each entry may include the title of the website, and a description of its contents. In most web directories, the entries are about whole websites, rather than individual pages within them (called "deep links"). Websites are often limited to inclusion in only a few categories.

There are two ways to find information on the Web: by searching or browsing. Web directories provide links in a structured list to make browsing easier. Many web directories combine searching and browsing by providing a search engine to search the directory. Unlike search engines, which base results on a database of entries gathered automatically by web crawler, most web directories are built manually by human editors. Many web directories allow site owners to submit their site for inclusion, and have editors review submissions for fitness.

=== Encyclopedia ===
An encyclopedia is a reference work or compendium providing summaries of knowledge, either general or special, in a particular field or discipline. Encyclopedias are divided into articles or entries that are arranged alphabetically by article name or by thematic categories, or, in the case of online encyclopedias, they are hyperlinked and searchable. Encyclopedia entries are longer and more detailed than those in most dictionaries. Generally speaking, encyclopedia articles focus on factual information concerning the subject named in the article's title; this is unlike dictionary entries, which focus on linguistic information about words, such as their etymology, meaning, pronunciation, use, and grammatical forms.

Encyclopedias have existed for around 2,000 years and have evolved considerably during that time as regards language (written in a major international or a vernacular language), size (few or many volumes), intent (presentation of a global or a limited range of knowledge), cultural perspective (authoritative, ideological, didactic, utilitarian), authorship (qualifications, style), readership (education level, background, interests, capabilities), and the technologies available for their production and distribution (hand-written manuscripts, small or large print runs, Internet). As a valued source of reliable information compiled by experts, printed versions found a prominent place in libraries, schools, and other educational institutions.

=== Gazetteer ===
In geography, a gazetteer is a dictionary or directory used in conjunction with a map or atlas. It typically contains information concerning the geographical makeup, social statistics and physical features of a country, region, or continent. Content of a gazetteer can include a subject's location, dimensions of peaks and waterways, population, gross domestic product and literacy rate. This information is generally divided into topics with entries listed in alphabetical order.

Ancient Greek gazetteers are known to have existed since the Hellenistic era. The first known Chinese gazetteer was released by the first century, and with the age of print media in China by the ninth century, the Chinese gentry became invested in producing gazetteers for their local areas as a source of information as well as local pride. The geographer Stephanus of Byzantium wrote a geographical dictionary (which currently has missing parts) in the sixth century which influenced later European compilers. Modern gazetteers can be found in reference sections of most libraries as well as on the internet.

=== Glossary ===
A glossary (from Ancient Greek: γλῶσσα, glossa; language, speech, wording), also known as a vocabulary or clavis, is an alphabetical list of terms in a particular domain of knowledge with their definitions. Glossaries are often placed at the end of a book to define novel, uncommon, or specialized terms. Glossaries are most commonly found in non-fiction.

A bilingual glossary defines words in another language.

=== Handbook ===
A handbook is a type of reference work, or other collection of instructions, that is intended to provide ready reference. The term originally applied to a small or portable book containing information useful for its owner, but the Oxford English Dictionary defines the current sense as "any book ... giving information such as facts on a particular subject, guidance in some art or occupation, instructions for operating a machine, or information for tourists."

A handbook is sometimes referred to as a vade mecum (Latin, "go with me") or pocket reference. It may also be referred to as an enchiridion. Historically, practical knowledge was typically learnt from a more experienced person. Due to literacy rates, many people could not learn from sources such as handbooks. The term signifies that it is a book "on hand". During the nineteenth century, many technological and scientific handbooks became "unhandy" in size and instead book series were more suitable, hence why the definition of handbook evolved.

=== Index ===
An index (: usually indexes, more rarely indices) is a list of words or phrases ('headings') and associated pointers ('locators') to where useful material relating to that heading can be found in a document or collection of documents. Examples are an index in the back matter of a book and an index that serves as a library catalog. An index differs from a word index, or concordance, in focusing on the subject of the text rather than the exact words in a text, and it differs from a table of contents because the index is ordered by subject, regardless of whether it is early or late in the book, while the listed items in a table of contents is placed in the same order as in the book.

In a traditional back-of-the-book index, the headings will include names of people, places, events, and concepts selected as being relevant and of interest to a possible reader of the book. The indexer performing the selection may be the author, the editor, or a professional indexer working as a third party. The pointers are typically page numbers, paragraph numbers or section numbers.

=== Lexicon ===
A lexicon (, rarely lexica) is the vocabulary of a language or branch of knowledge (such as nautical or medical). In linguistics, a lexicon is a language's inventory of lexemes. The word lexicon derives from Greek word λεξικόν (lexikon), neuter of λεξικός (lexikos) meaning 'of or for words'.

Linguistic theories generally regard human languages as consisting of two parts: a lexicon, essentially a catalogue of a language's words (its wordstock); and a grammar, a system of rules which allow for the combination of those words into meaningful sentences. The lexicon is also thought to include bound morphemes, which cannot stand alone as words (such as most affixes). In some analyses, compound words and certain classes of idiomatic expressions, collocations and other phrasemes are also considered to be part of the lexicon. Dictionaries are lists of the lexicon, in alphabetical order, of a given language; usually, however, bound morphemes are not included.

=== List ===
A list is a set of discrete items of information collected and set forth in some format for utility, entertainment, or other purposes. A list may be memorialized in any number of ways, including existing only in the mind of the list-maker, but lists are frequently written down on paper, or maintained electronically. Although lists may be made for entertainment, lists are "most frequently a tool".

=== Phrase book ===
A phrase book or phrasebook is a collection of ready-made phrases, usually for a foreign language along with a translation, indexed and often in the form of questions and answers.

=== Ready reckoner ===
A ready reckoner is a reference book or page that presents commonly used calculations alongside their corresponding results, enabling rapid retrieval of answers. They were extensively employed in retail and by tradespeople prior to the widespread availability of inexpensive electronic calculators, the adoption of metric weights and measures and the introduction of decimalized currencies in the 1970s.

=== Textbook ===
A textbook is a book containing a comprehensive compilation of content in a branch of study serving to explain the subject. Textbooks are produced to meet the needs of educators, usually at educational institutions, as well as learners (who could be independent learners outside of formal education). Schoolbooks are textbooks and other books used in schools. Today, many textbooks are published in both print and digital formats.

=== Thesaurus ===
A thesaurus (: thesauri or thesauruses), sometimes called a synonym dictionary or dictionary of synonyms, is a reference work which arranges words by their meanings (or in simpler terms, a book where one can find different words with similar meanings to other words), sometimes as a hierarchy of broader and narrower terms, sometimes simply as lists of synonyms and antonyms. They are often used by writers to help find the best word to express an idea:

...to find the word, or words, by which [an] idea may be most fitly and aptly expressed

— Peter Mark Roget, 1852

Synonym dictionaries have a long history. The word 'thesaurus' was used in 1852 by Peter Mark Roget for his Roget's Thesaurus.

=== Timetable ===
A schedule (UK: /ˈʃɛdjuːl/, US: /ˈskɛdʒuːl/) or a timetable, as a basic time-management tool, consists of a list of times at which possible tasks, events, or actions are intended to take place, or of a sequence of events in the chronological order in which such things are intended to take place. The process of creating a schedule — deciding how to order these tasks and how to commit resources between the variety of possible tasks — is called scheduling, and a person responsible for making a particular schedule may be called a scheduler. Making and following schedules is an ancient human activity.

Some scenarios associate this kind of planning with learning life skills. Schedules are necessary, or at least useful, in situations where individuals need to know what time they must be at a specific location to receive a specific service, and where people need to accomplish a set of goals within a set time.

=== User guide ===
A user guide, user manual, owner's manual or instruction manual is intended to assist users in using a particular product, service or application. It is usually written by a technician, product developer, or a company's customer service staff.

Most user guides contain both a written guide and associated images. In the case of computer applications, it is usual to include screenshots of the human-machine interface(s), and hardware manuals often include clear, simplified diagrams. The language used is matched to the intended audience, with jargon kept to a minimum or explained thoroughly.

=== Yearbook ===
A yearbook, also known as an annual, is a type of book published annually. One use is to record, highlight, and commemorate the past year of a school. The term also refers to an annual book of statistics or facts. A yearbook often has an overarching theme that runs throughout.

Many high schools, colleges, elementary and middle schools publish yearbooks; however, many schools are dropping yearbooks or decreasing page counts given social media alternatives to a mass-produced physical photographically oriented record. From 1995 to 2013, the number of U.S. college yearbooks dropped from roughly 2,400 to 1,000.

=== Other ===
- Books of quotations
- Catalogues of classical compositions

== Electronic resources ==
An electronic resource is a computer program or data that is stored electronically, which is usually found on a computer, including information that is available on the Internet. Libraries offer numerous types of electronic resources including electronic texts such as electronic books and electronic journals, bibliographic databases, institutional repositories, websites, and software applications.

== Bibliography ==
=== General ===
- Cheney, Frances Neel (1971). Fundamental Reference Sources. Chicago: American Library Association.
- Higgens, Gavin, ed. (1984). Printed Reference Material. Handbooks on Library Practice (2nd revised ed.). London: Library Association. ISBN 978-0853659952.
- Katz, William A. (2001). Introduction to Reference Work, Volume 1: Basic Information Services (8th ed.). New York: McGraw-Hill. ISBN 978-0072441079.
- Katz, William A. (2001). Introduction to Reference Work, Volume 2: Reference Services and Reference Processes (8th ed.). New York: McGraw-Hill. ISBN 978-0072441437.
- Lynch, Jack (2016). You Could Look It Up: The Reference Shelf From Ancient Babylon to Wikipedia. New York: Bloomsbury Press. ISBN 978-0802777522.

=== Guides to reference works ===
- Heeks, Peggy (1968). Books of Reference for School Libraries: An Annotated List (2nd ed.). London: Library Association. ASIN B0006C36OO.
- Malclès, Louise Noëlle (1950). Les sources du travail bibliographique (in French). Geneva: Librairie Droz.
- Totok, Wilhelm; Weitzel, Rolf (1984–1985). Handbuch der bibliographischen Nachschlagewerke (in German) (6th ed.). Frankfurt am Main: Klostermann. First published in 1954.

American emphasis

- Sheehy, Eugene P. (1976). Guide to Reference Books (9th ed.). Chicago: American Library Association. ISBN 978-0838902059.

Originally compiled by Alice B. Kroeger for first two editions beginning in 1902. Subsequently, edited by Isadore Gilbert Mudge (3rd through 6th editions) and Constance Mabel Winchell (7th and 8th editions).

- Chenoweth, Juneal M. (ed.). American Reference Books Annual. Santa Barbara, California: Libraries Unlimited. ISBN 978-1-4408-6913-6. Published annually beginning in 1970.
  - See also selective cumulations e.g. Holte, Susan; Wynar, Bohdan, eds. (1981). Best Reference Books 1970-1980: Titles of Lasting Value Selected from ARBA. Libraries Unlimited, Inc.
- Clarke, Jack A. (1977). The Reader's Adviser: A Layman's Guide to Literature (12th ed.). New York: Bowker. 3 vols.

British emphasis

- Walford, A. J., ed. (1980). Walford's Guide to Reference Material, Volume 1: Science and Technology (4th ed.). London: Library Association. ISBN 9780853656111.
- Walford, A. J.; Taylor, L. J., eds. (1987). Walford's Guide to Reference Material, Volume 2: Generalia, Language and Literature, The Arts (4th ed.). London: Library Association.
- Walford, A. J., ed. (1981). Walford's Concise Guide to Reference Material. London: Library Association. (an abridgement of Walford's Guide)
- Lester, Ray, ed. (2005). New Walford Guide to Reference Resources, Volume 1: Science, Technology, and Medicine. New York: Neal-Schuman Publishers. ISBN 978-1856044950.
- Lester, Ray; Clinch, Peter; Dawson, Heather; Edwards, Helen; Tarrant, Susan, eds. (2007). New Walford Guide to Reference Resources, Volume 2: Social Sciences. London: Facet Publishing. ISBN 978-1856044981.
- Lester, Ray, ed. (2015). New Walford Guide to Reference Resources, Volume 3: Arts, Humanities, and General Reference. London: Facet Publishing. ISBN 978-1856044998.
