= Books in France =

As of 2018, five firms in France rank among the world's biggest publishers of books in terms of revenue: Éditions Lefebvre Sarrut, Groupe Albin Michel, Groupe Madrigall (including Éditions Gallimard), Hachette Livre (including Éditions Grasset), and Martinière Groupe (including Éditions du Seuil). (Note: The same five also topped the list in 2016 and 2017.)

== History ==
In 1292 the book-trade of Paris consisted of 24 copyists, 17 bookbinders, 19 parchment makers, 13 illuminators, 8 dealers in manuscripts.

In Paris in 1470, Martin Crantz, Michael Freyburger, and Ulrich Gering produced the first printed book in France, Epistolae (letters), by Gasparinus de Bergamo. In 1476 in Lyon appeared one of the first printed French-language books, La Légende Dorée (Golden Legend) by Jacobus de Voragine.

The French royal library began at the Louvre Palace in 1368 during the reign of Charles V, opened to the public in 1692, and became the Bibliothèque nationale de France in 1792. The Centre national du livre (Center for the Book) formed in 1946. The Salon Livre Paris began in 1981.

The history of the book in France has been studied from a variety of cultural, economic, political, and social angles. Influential scholars include Roger Chartier, Robert Darnton, Elizabeth Eisenstein, and Henri-Jean Martin.

== Bookselling ==
The Cercle de la Librairie (book trade union) organized in 1847 in Paris, and the Syndicat National de la Librairie Ancienne et Moderne booksellers association in 1914.

L'Express started a bestseller list in 1961, and Livres Hebdo started one in 1984.

== In popular culture ==
- The Reader (1988 film)
- Hugo (film), 2011, includes brief scene in fictional Paris bookshop

== See also ==
- Collection (publishing)
- Copyright law of France
- Legal deposit: France
- Media of France
- French literature
- French bibliophiles
- List of libraries in France
  - Libraries in Paris
- List of book fairs in France (in French)
- List of book-burning incidents, some in France
- French children's books
- Musée de l'Imprimerie (printing museum), Lyon, est. 1964

== Bibliography ==
=== in English ===
- G.W. Porter; G.K. Fortescue, eds. (1889). "Bibliographies of Countries: France". List of Bibliographical Works in the Reading Room of the British Museum (2nd ed.). London. OCLC 3816244 – via Internet Archive.
- Anatole Claudin (1898). The First Paris Press: an account of the books printed for G. Fichet and J. Heynlin in the Sorbonne, 1470-1472. London: Chiswick Press for The Bibliographical Society.
- Robert Proctor (1898). "Books Printed From Types: France". Index to the Early Printed Books in the British Museum. London: Kegan Paul, Trench, Trübner and Company. pp. 561+. hdl:2027/uc1.c3450632. OCLC 6438080 – via HathiTrust.
- Alice Bertha Kroeger; Isadore Gilbert Mudge (1917). "Bibliography: National and Trade: French". Guide to the Study and Use of Reference Books (3rd ed.). American Library Association.
- David T. Pottinger (1958). French Book Trade in the Ancien Regime, 1500-1791. Harvard University Press. ISBN 9780674432581.
- Allen Kent; et al., eds. (1978). "Printers and Printing". Encyclopedia of Library and Information Science. Vol. 23. Marcel Dekker. ISBN 978-0-8247-2023-0.
  - Printing in France before 1501, p. 342+
  - 16th Century: France
  - 17th Century: France
  - 18th Century: France
- Roger Chartier (1987), "Frenchness in the History of the Book" (PDF), Proceedings of the American Antiquarian Society, 97
- David J. Shaw (1993), "Two unrecorded incunables: Rouen, circa 1497, and Lyons, circa 1500", British Library Journal, UK, ISSN 1478-0259
- Philip G. Altbach; Edith S. Hoshino, eds. (1995). "France". International Book Publishing: An Encyclopedia. Garland. ISBN 9781134261260.
- Robert Darnton (1996). Forbidden Best-sellers of Pre-revolutionary France. Norton. ISBN 978-0-393-31442-7. ("What did the French read in the eighteenth century?")
- "France: Directory: Publishers". Europa World Year Book 2004. Europa Publications. 2004. p. 1700+. ISBN 1857432533.
- Andrew Pettegree; Malcolm Walsby; Alexander Wilkinson, eds. (2007). French Vernacular Books: Books Published in the French Language before 1601. Vol. 1–2. Brill. ISBN 9789004156876. + Volumes 3-4 (2011): Books published in France before 1601 in Latin and Languages other than French
- Vincent Giroud (2013). "France". In Michael F. Suarez; H. R. Woudhuysen (eds.). The Book: A Global History. Oxford University Press. ISBN 978-0-19-967941-6.
- "French book publishers risk being lost in translation without global reach", Guardian, UK, 13 May 2014
- Pamela Druckerman (9 July 2014), "The French Do Buy Books. Real Books", New York Times

=== in French ===
- Bibliographie de l'Empire français (in French) 1811-
- fr:Revue française d'histoire du livre (in French), Société des bibliophiles de Guyenne, OCLC 647906247 1971-
- Henri-Jean Martin; Roger Chartier, eds. (1989–1991). Histoire de l'édition française (in French) (2nd ed.). Paris. ISBN 2213024006.
- Pascal Fouché [in French], ed. (1998). L'édition française depuis 1945 (in French). Éditions du Cercle de la Librairie. ISBN 2-7654-0708-8.
- Lylette Lacôte-Gabrysiak (2010). "C'est un best-seller! Meilleures ventes de livres en France de 1984 à 2004" [Bestselling books in France from 1984 to 2004]. Communication (in French). 27. Canada: Université Laval. doi:10.4000/communication.3130. ISSN 1920-7344 – via Revues.org.

== Images ==
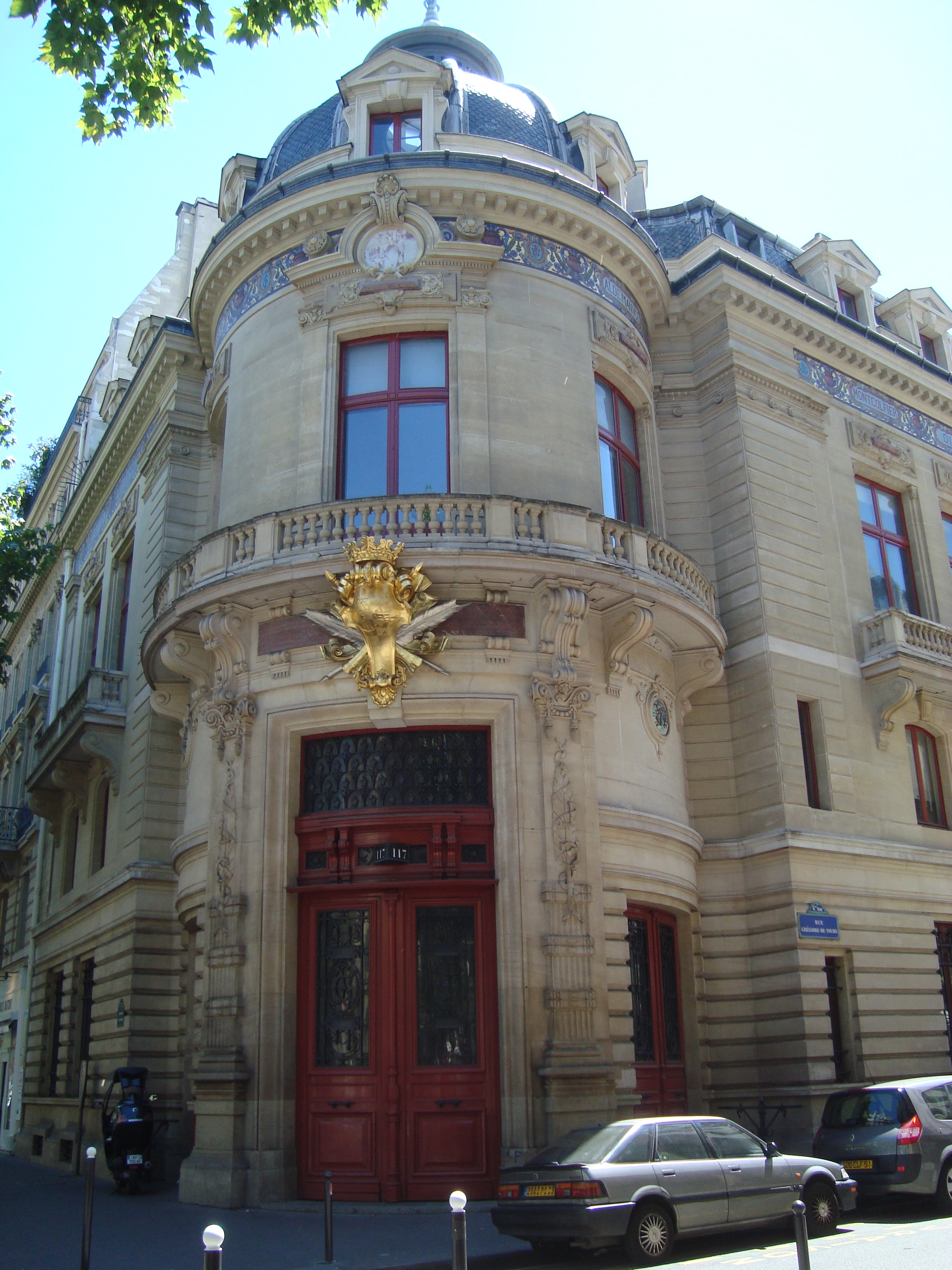
Cercle de la Librairie in Paris, built in 1879 (photo 2010)

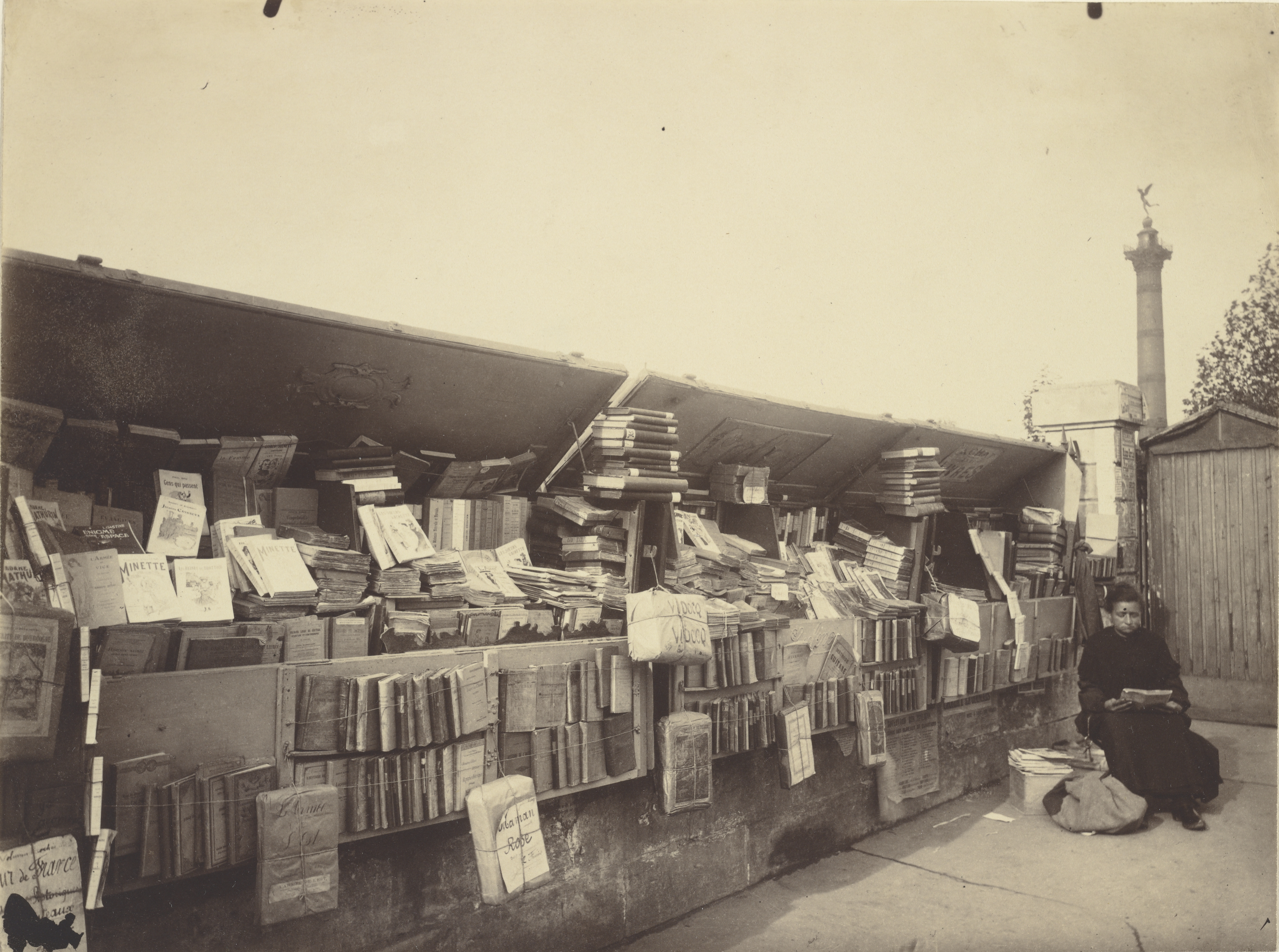
Bookseller, Place de la Bastille, Paris, c. 1910

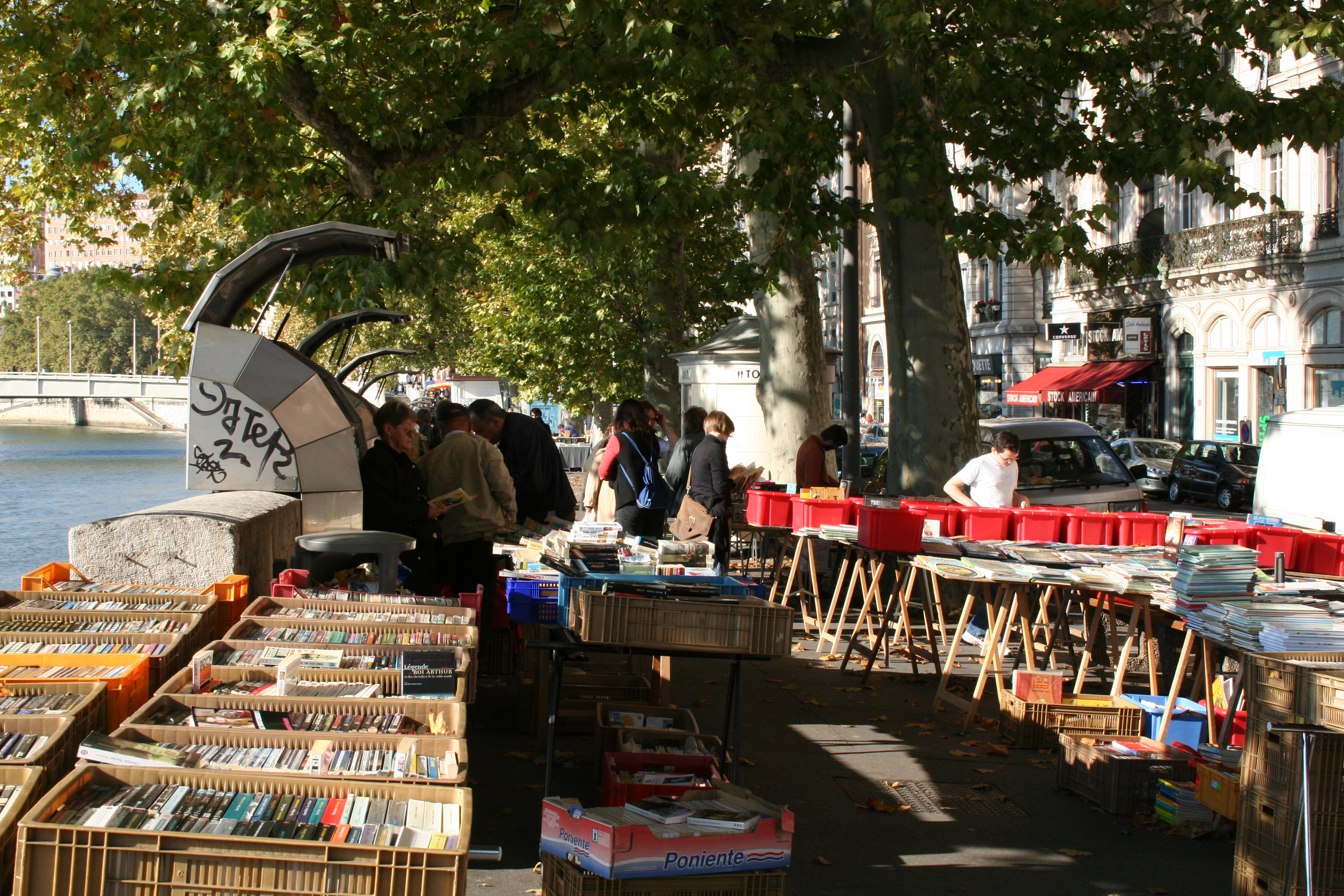
Outdoor bookselling in Lyon, 2008

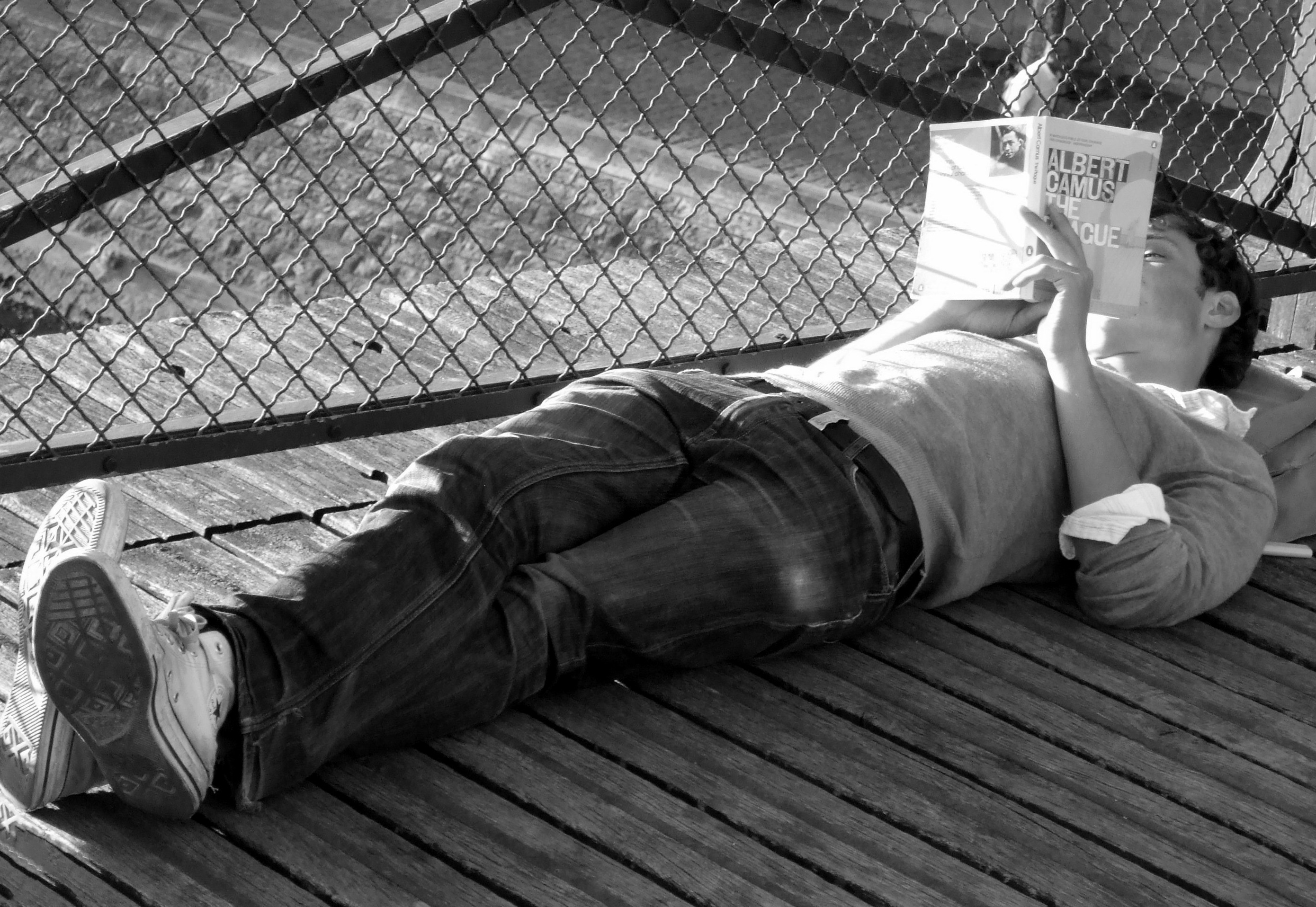
Reader on the Pont des Arts, Paris, 2009

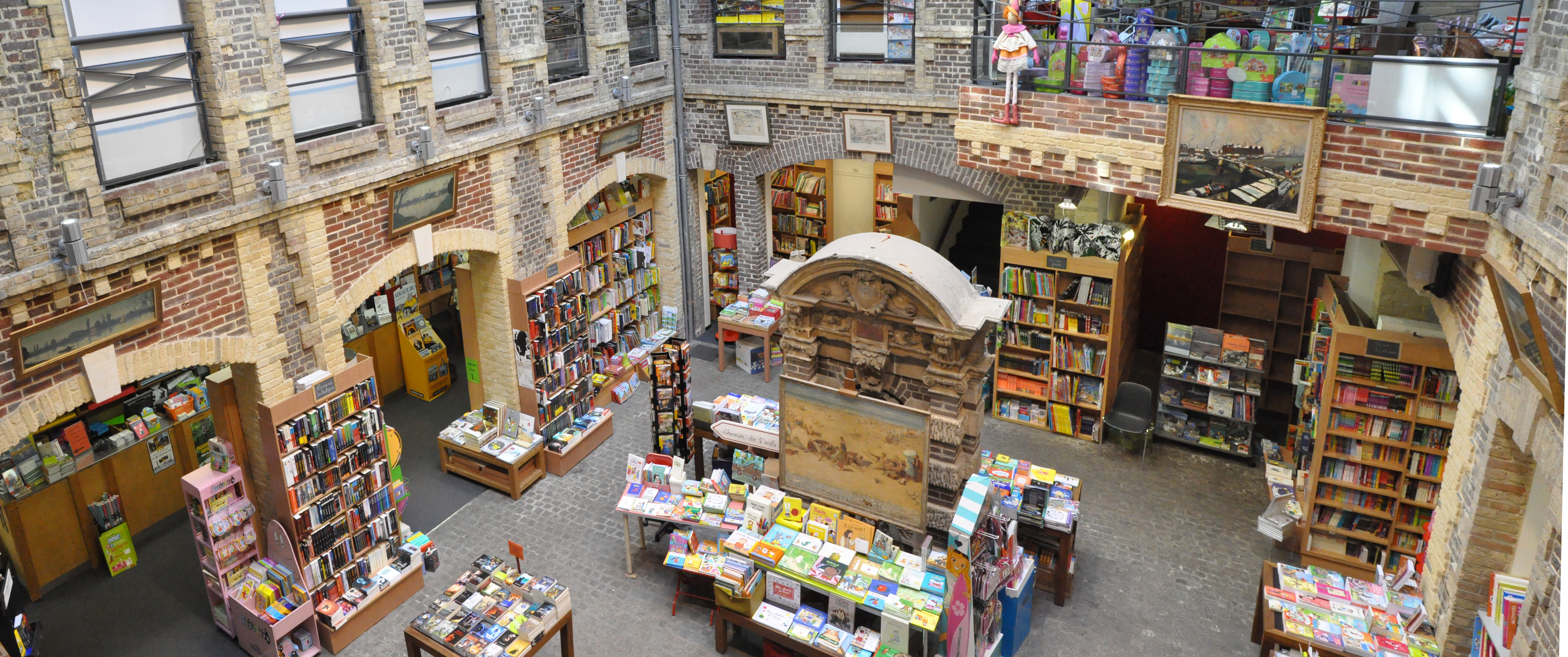
L'Armitière bookshop in Rouen, est. 1963 (photo 2013)

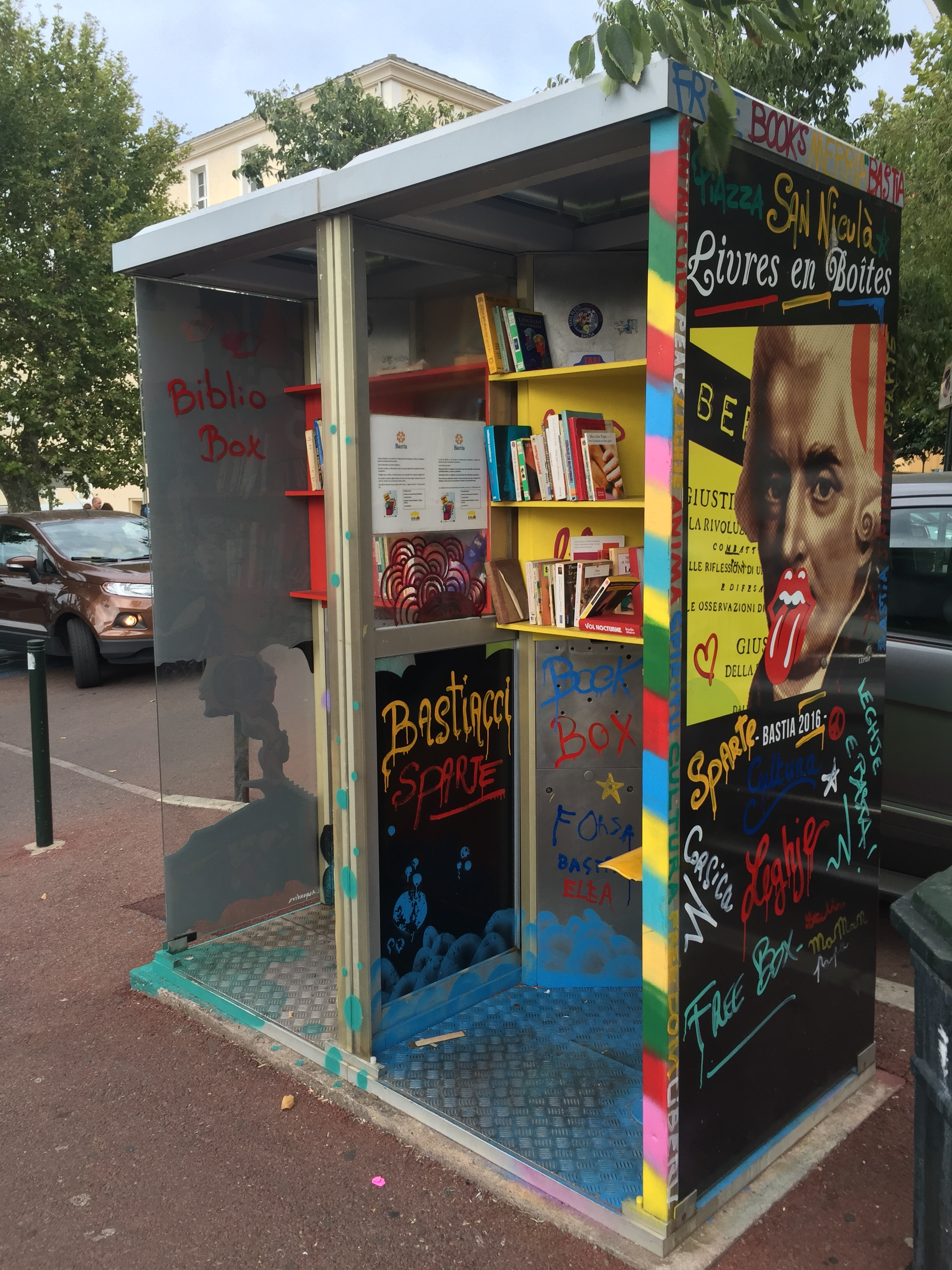
Public bookcase in Bastia, 2016

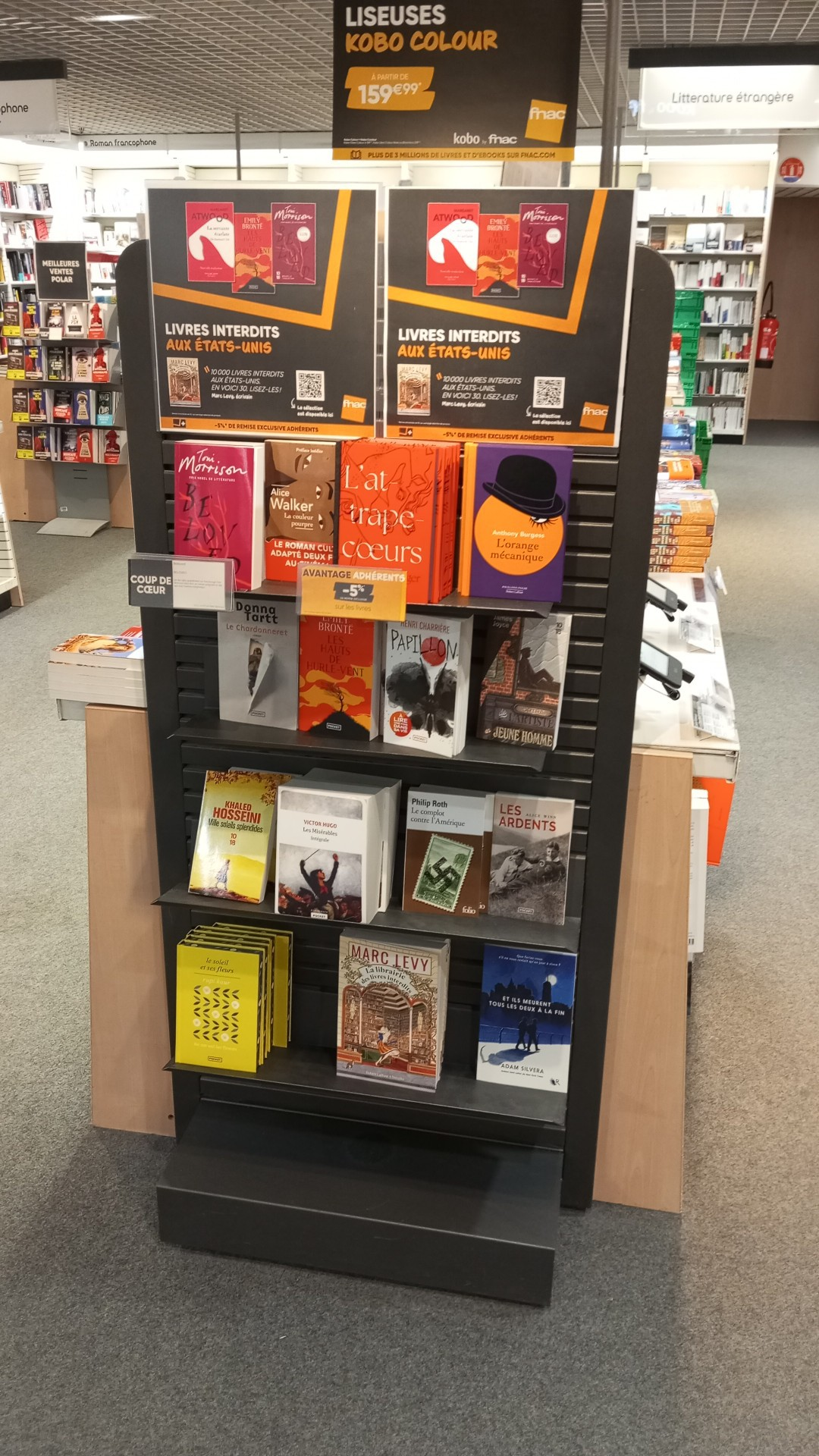
Selection of books at Fnac in Dijon: "Banned books" from the United States in May 2025
