= Idlebrain.com =

Indian website about Telugu cinema

- Website logo
- Website type: Film news and reviews
- Available in: English
- Owner: G.V Ramana (Jeevi)
- Industry: Internet services
- Website: Idlebrain.com
- Commercial: Yes
- Registration: Free/subscription
- Launched: December 1999
- Current status: Active

Idlebrain.com is an Indian entertainment website dedicated to Telugu cinema. Established in 1999 by G. V. Ramana, popularly known as Jeevi, a graduate of BITS Pilani, the site is among the oldest websites on the Internet focused on Telugu films.

The site features film reviews, news, box office updates, trailers, interviews, photo galleries, and movie schedules. Jeevi's film reviews, starting with Iddaru Mitrulu (1999), have made the site particularly popular, with an archive of over 1,000 reviews as of April 2023. It is regarded as a prominent online resource for Telugu cinema.

== History ==
G. V. Ramana (born c. 1974), popularly known by his nom de plume Jeevi, is a graduate of BITS Pilani who had short stints in software and finance firms. While he was working in a private firm in Mumbai, his only connection with Telugu cinema was stray magazines. At that time, for a cinephile like him staying outside Andhra Pradesh, latest information related to Telugu films was scarce and hard to find and so he decided to launch a website.

In December 1999 he launched Idlebrain.com, a website covering Telugu cinema, with the help of his friend Sunil Krishna who was based in Sunnyvale, California. Initially, Sunil hosted the site on his home computer. Jeevi used to contribute to the fledgling site personally while also keeping his dayjob.

Armed with a digital camera, Jeevi used to stop on roads and click at wayside billboards with eye-catching posters and upload them on his site. In the summer of 2001, he resigned from his job and started working on the website fulltime. In about a year, Jeevi started interacting with producers for getting the latest information from official sources. Producers like Shyam Prasad Reddy, K. S. Rama Rao, Chalasani Ramesh, and Sravanthi Ravi Kishore evinced interest regarding the information on the website.

Jeevi also started writing reviews of films on the site. As of October 2008, he reviewed over 500 Telugu films and 100 Hindi films. His reviews quickly became popular in the industry and among movie buffs. His review format covers assessment of a film's plot, actors' performance, music, cinematography, and other technical aspects.

In October 2008 Jeevi claimed that Idlebrain had about one lakh daily visitors, with about 40% of them from the US and 50% from metros in India.

== Reception ==
In August 2002, Geetanath V. of The Hindu opined that the website was "not only colourful, but also has several attractive features contrary to its name". It added that Idlebrain.com was the most happening among the various film websites.

In April 2006, Y. Sunita Chowdhary of The Hindu called Idlebrain.com "a leading player in its segment."

In its October 2008 issue, lifestyle magazine Hyderabad Josh noted that Idlebrain is popular among the NRI community especially in the US. It further mentioned that Idlebrain had a sizeable following among movie buffs in metropolitan cities of India like Hyderabad, Mumbai, Delhi, Chennai, Pune, and Bangalore.

In August 2009, CNBC TV18 wrote, "Idlebrain is an online Telugu movie ready reckoner for film buffs who find themselves working in a distant land." It also noted, "While most film websites run on industry gossip, what strikes you about Idlebrain.com is information about overseas screenings for Telugu expats starved of their regular dose of popular movie stars. Jeevi's reviews are particularly popular among the Telugu NRI community, so much so that DVD rental prices are decided based on his ratings."

The website won the Andhra Pradesh Cinegoers' Association award for the Best Telugu Film website in 2008. It has been noted by distributors that Jeevi's reviews affect the box office performance of films in the overseas market and the DVD rental prices are decided based on his ratings.

In Revisiting Star Studies: Cultures, Themes and Methods (2017), Kiranmayi Indraganti remarked that Idlebrain.com was a pioneer of a major shift in Telugu cinema in which the public consumption of film information widened from print media to internet and digital media.
