= William Katz =

William Katz may refer to:

- William Loren Katz (1927–2019), American teacher, historian, and author
- William Katz (librarian) (1924–2004), American librarian, author, and editor
