= Centre national du livre =

French administrative public body

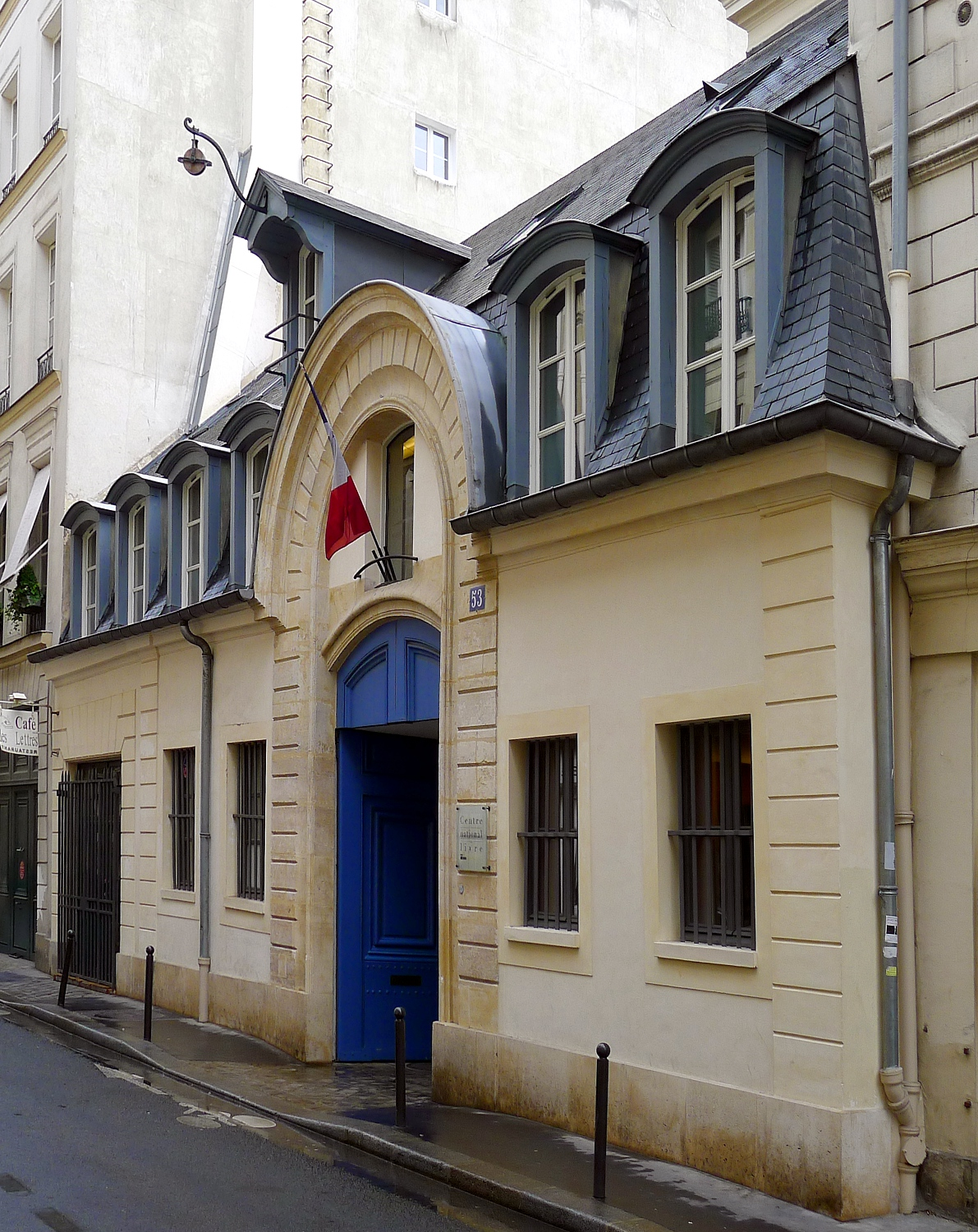
The Centre national du livre at 53 rue de Verneuil, 7th arrondissement of Paris.

The Centre national du livre (CNL) is a French établissement public à caractère administratif.

The CNL is placed under the administrative supervision of the French Ministry of Culture and Communication (Direction générale des Médias et des Industries culturelles, Service du Livre et de la Lecture). Its vocation and mission is to support the entire book chain (authors, publishers, booksellers, libraries, promoters of books and reading), and in particular the creation and dissemination of the most ambitious literary works. It grants loans and scholarships on the advice of specialised committees.

== Organisation and missions ==
More than 300 professionals (writers, academics, journalists, researchers, translators, critics, publishers, booksellers, etc.) sit on 25 thematic committees. These committees meet one to three times a year to consider applications and give their opinion on the allocation of grants.

The work of these commissions is also supported by an extensive network of external collaborators and readers, whose experience and expertise contribute to the quality of the CNL's work.

These interventions take the form either of direct aid to those who create books (authors or publishers) or of indirect aid by subsidising those who distribute books (booksellers, libraries). For example, the CNL grants aid for the opening or development of certain public libraries or to encourage the creation of specific collections. It also helps university libraries to acquire high-quality scientific documents published in French.

Until 2010, the CNL was chaired ex officio by the Director of Books and Reading and then by the Director General of Media and Cultural Industries. However, a decree of 27 April 2010 provided for the appointment of a president to substitute the ex officio president. Jean-François Colosimo was therefore appointed President on 12 May 2010. He was succeeded in 2013 by Vincent Monadé. Régine Hatchondo, appointed on 18 November 2020, is the current president of the CNL.

Since 2021, thanks to the year of reading as a "great national cause", the National Book Centre (CNL) has undertaken an ambitious programme of national actions to promote books and reading among all French people.

The CNL's actions, which are now permanent, focus on three areas: increasing the number of encounters between authors and different audiences; putting reading at the heart of the lives of the French citizens who are furthest from it; and sharing the pleasure of reading through reading aloud. The CNL's actions, which are now permanent, focus on three areas: increasing the number of encounters between authors and different audiences, placing reading at the heart of the lives of the most excluded French citizens, and sharing the pleasure of reading through reading aloud. By 2022, the CNL will have organised 200 residencies in schools, 500 author masterclasses in secondary schools, supported 1,000 events organised by civil society throughout France and launched new programmes such as the Prix Goncourt des détenus ("Inmate's Goncourt Prize") in some thirty prisons, or the "Quart d'heure national de lecture" (National Quarter-Hour of Reading) on 10 March.

== Directors of the CNL ==
- 1975–1980: Jean-Claude Groshens
- 1980–1981: Pierre Vandevoorde
- 1981–1989: Jean Gattégno
- 1989–1993: Évelyne Pisier
- 1993–2003: Jean-Sébastien Dupuit
- 2003–2005: Éric Gross
- 2005–2009: Benoît Yvert
- 2010–2013: Jean-François Colosimo.
- 2013–2020: Vincent Monadé
- Since 2020: Régine Hatchondo

== See also ==
- Books in France
