= Dunkin Van Rensselaer Johnston =

American librarian and library school instructor (1862 – 1919)

- Born: January 7, 1862; Richmond, Virginia, United States
- Died: December 22, 1919 (aged 57)
- Alma mater: Hobart and William Smith Colleges
- Occupation: Librarian

Dunkin Van Rensselaer Johnston (January 7, 1862 – December 22, 1919) was a reference librarian and instructor of reference service and book binding at the New York State Library School in Albany. In 1890, he taught the first formal course in reference service ever offered.

== Life ==
Dunkin Van Rensselaer Johnston was born on January 7, 1862 in Richmond, Virginia. He attended Hobart College where he earned his B.A. in 1883 and his M.A. in 1886. He was a member of Phi Beta Kappa and Sigma Phi. He joined the New York State Library in 1883 as acting assistant librarian, was an assistant librarian from 1884 to 1890, and was promoted to reference librarian in 1890.

In 1890, Johnston became an instructor at the New York State Library School. That year, he taught the first course ever offered on reference service. Johnston is known as the first person to systematize early efforts by Samuel Swett Green, Justin Winsor, and Melvil Dewey to provide informational assistance to library users. Within the first few years of his teaching, reference work was established in the profession as a formal topic of study. He continued teaching courses in reference service and bookbinding at the library school until 1905.

A list of reference books used in Johnston's course was published, first in 1899 and then revised in 1903, in the State Library Bulletin.

In 1909, he earned a Doctor of Humane Letters from Hobart College. He taught many of the profession's pioneer figures, including Isadore Gilbert Mudge and Josaphine Adams Rathbone.

== Selected publications ==
- "Binding and Binderies." Library Journal 16: 9-16. December 1891.
- "Elements in Library Binding" In U.S. Office of Education Annual Report, 1892-1893, 907-16.
- "Notes on Binding" Library Journal 17: 13-15. July-August 1892.
- "Selected Reference Works". State Library Bulletin: Library School. 4: 149-218. October 1899.
- "Material for Course in Reference Study". State Library Bulletin 83: Library School. 16: 297. 1903.
