= Ready reckoner =

Table containing pre-calculated values

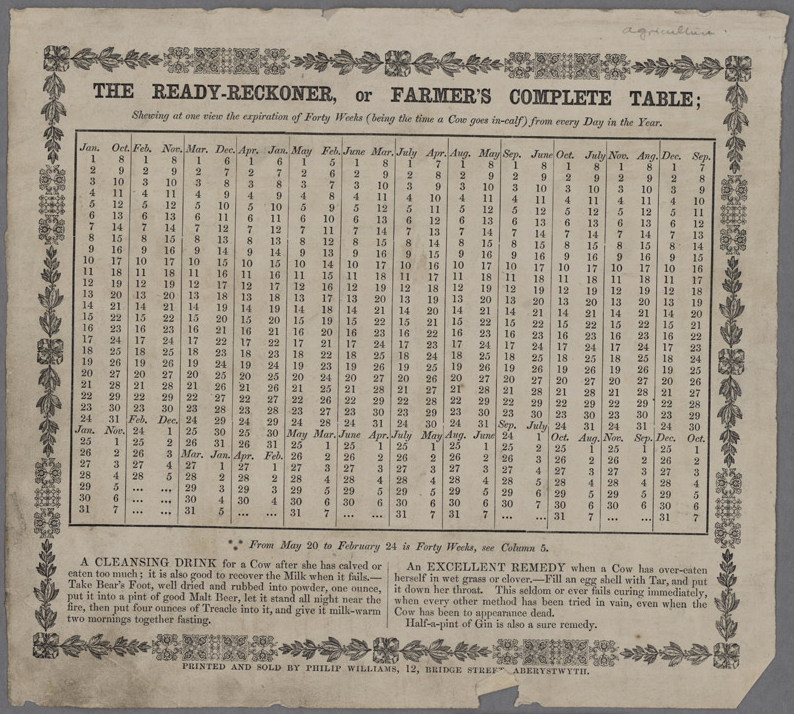
The Ready-Reckoner, or Farmer’s Complete Table; Aberystwyth, 19th century

A ready reckoner is a reference book or page that presents commonly used calculations alongside their corresponding results, enabling rapid retrieval of answers. They were extensively employed in retail and by tradespeople prior to the widespread availability of inexpensive electronic calculators, the adoption of metric weights and measures and the introduction of decimalized currencies in the 1970s.

== Background ==
Before the 1960s and the widespread introduction of calculators, multiplication was a laborious chore, often prone to error. This was especially so when calculations involved non-decimal currencies or weights and measures. Various devices were invented to aid this process, such as the abacus, log tables, slide rule, stepped reckoner, or the comptometer, but the most commonly used device for everyday commerce was the ready reckoner. These could be either general-purpose – aimed to meet the needs of a variety of trades – or designed specifically for one trade or group of trades.

== History ==
The earliest surviving ready reckoner in English dates from the 1570s; other sources attribute the invention to the Dutch mathematician Simon Stevin, who calculated and published decimal tables in the 1580s. William Webster published A plaine and most necessarie booke of tables, for simple and compound interest, in 1625. There are several other seventeenth-century publications giving 'reckonings ready done' or 'accounts ready cast up' or tables of simple and compound interest. The most popular of these was William Leybourn's, Panarithmologia, being a mirror breviate treasure mate for merchants, bankers, tradesmen, mechanicks, and a sure guide for purchasers, sellers, or mortgagers of land, leases, annuities, rents, pensions, &c. in present possession or reversion. (1693). Other works were published in France such as François Barrême's Le Livre des Comptes Faits. Paris: Thierry, which appeared in 1673, and was still being published in 1862.

The term 'ready reckoner' was coined by the schoolmaster Daniel Fenning with the publication of The ready reckoner; or trader's most useful assistant in 1757. This was a modernised and extended version of Leybourn's work, which was reprinted in Boston, Massachusetts, about 1770, and translated into German in Germantown, Philadelphia, 1774. Fenning's work continued to be reprinted in England until the early 1820s when several of the tables were superseded by the advent Imperial Weights and Measures under the Weights and Measures Act 1824 (5 Geo. 4. c. 74).

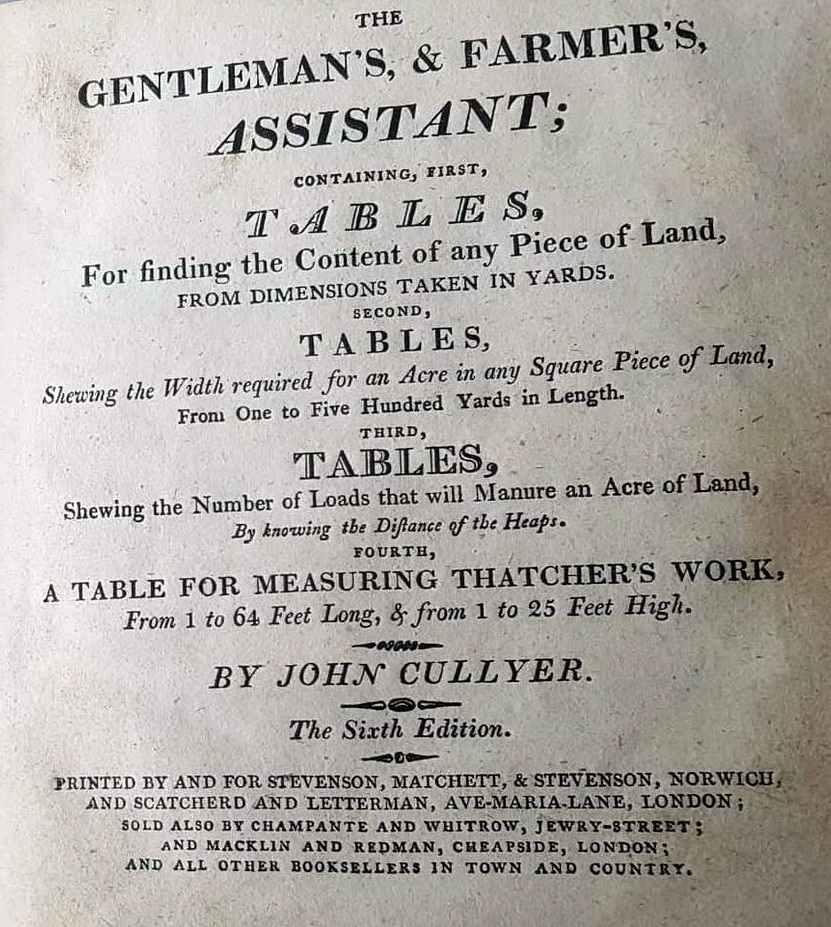
The Gentleman's & Farmer's Assistant, by John Cullyer (1808)

By the end of the eighteenth century, ready reckoners designed for the needs of particular trades or types of business began to appear. Thus The gentleman and farmers' assistant, by John Cullyer (1795) or The farmer's, grazier's, and butcher's ready reckoner (1796).

Hundreds of ready reckoners appeared, principally in the UK and US throughout the nineteenth century and the first half of the twentieth century, as they proved to be cheaper to produce and easier to use than alternative means of calculation. According to Williams and Johnson, 'Ready Reckoners were the dominant aid used for multiplication in trade from 1800 to 1950. Throughout this period their sales far exceeded any other calculating aid used in trade to assist in making routine calculations.' It was only with the gradual introduction of mechanical and later electronic calculators that they began to be superseded.
