= Reference and User Services Quarterly =

- Discipline: Library science
- Language: English
- Edited by: Kathleen Kern

Publication details
- Former name: Reference Quarterly
- History: 1961–present
- Publisher: American Library Association (United States)
- Frequency: Quarterly

Standard abbreviations
- ISO 4: Ref. User Serv. Q.

Indexing
- CODEN: RUSQFU
- ISSN: 1094-9054
- LCCN: 98643583
- OCLC no.: 37395409

Links
- Journal homepage

Reference and User Services Quarterly is a quarterly peer-reviewed academic journal covering library science. It is the official journal of the Reference and User Services Association and is published by the American Library Association. The journal was established as the Reference Quarterly in 1961 under the editorship of William Katz. A silver anniversary series appeared in 1986. The journal was retitled and obtained its current name in 1997.

In 1985 the journal appeared twice in the set design for the movie, Back to the Future, next to the bed of Marty McFly.

The journal is available electronically via EBSCO, Academic OneFile, and WilsonWeb, as well as its own website.
