= Eugene P. Sheehy =

Eugene P. Sheehy

Eugene P. Sheehy (October 10, 1922 - February 26, 2013) was an American academic librarian, professional researcher, author and editor.

== Career ==
As a librarian he served as the head of the reference department at Columbia University in New York City from 1967-86. He was editor-in-chief for the Guide to Reference, an exhaustive meta-reference book published by the American Library Association that reviewed periodicals and journals of all disciplines. His version of GRB was widely used in the 1970s and 1980s as an educational tool for library students, as a tool for reference librarians to assist them with difficult searches and as a tool for purchasers for libraries to assist them in choosing which materials to obtain for their library.

== Early life ==
Born in Elbow Lake, Minnesota, Sheehy was the son of a farmer. He served in the United States Marine Corps from 1942–46, where he became a sergeant. After finishing his military service Sheehy earned a B.A. from Saint John's University in Collegeville, MN in 1950; an M.A. from the University of Minnesota in 1951; and a B.S. in Library Science from the University of Minnesota in 1952. Sheehy then started his career as a librarian. In 1952 Sheehy became an academic librarian at Georgetown University in Washington, D.C. After one year, he left there to take a similar position at Columbia University. It was there under the tutelage of Constance Mabel Winchell that he began writing and editing reviews and indexes for reference materials. In 1967 Winchell retired and Sheehy took over as head of the reference department as well as head editor for the Guide to Reference Books.

== Sources ==
- Cheatham, Bertha M. "Reviews the Book 'Guide to Reference Books' edited by Eugene P. Sheehy." School Library Journal. 33.7. (March, 1987): 88.
- Galvin, Tom. "Review of The Guide to Reference Books by Eugene P. Sheehy." Library Journal. (September 15, 1968): 89.
- Harris, Robert R. "Guide to Reference Books (Book Review)." Library Journal. 101.22. (December 15, 1976): 2560.
- Plotnik, Art. "From Winchell's 8th to Sheehy's 9th." American Libraries. 8.3. (March, 1977): 129-133.
- Kieft, Robert. "When Reference Works Are Not Books: The New Edition of the Guide to Reference Books." Reference and User Services Quarterly. 41.4. (July, 2002): 330-335.
- Rubin, Richard E. Foundations of Library and Information Science. 2nd ed. New York City: Neal-Schuman Publishers, Inc, 2004.
- Sheehy, Eugene P. "Preface." Guide to Reference Books. 10th ed. Ed. Eugene P. Sheehy. Chicago: American Library Association, 1986. ix-xi.
- Washburn, Anne. "Guide to Reference Books (Book Review)." Library Journal. 105.13. (July 1, 1980): 1502.
