= Guide to Reference =

Daniel Ayobami Obasa

Guide to Reference, published in 2008 as the online successor to Guide to Reference Books, was a selective guide to the best print and online reference sources. An editorial team of reference librarians and subject experts selected and annotated some 16,000 entries, which were organized by subject. It was a subscription database, published by the American Library Association, and was updated on an ongoing basis. It was intended as a resource for libraries when answering reference questions, planning library instruction, identifying items to purchase, and training staff.

The print edition was published regularly since 1902 by the American Library Association, and had been a staple of academic reference libraries throughout the United States. However, its popularity of use had dropped in recent years with the continued rise of electronic databases.

The online product was closed down on March 31, 2016.

== History ==
The Guide was written in the first decade of the twentieth century by Alice Bertha Kroeger, head of the Library School at Drexel University in Philadelphia, Pennsylvania. She developed a 104-page volume meant to educate students and professionals within the library community. Filled with short articles and indexes to other publications for further reading, Kroeger used her book to “codify both the principles of education for reference librarianship and reference librarianship’s province of expertise” (Kieft, 331). It also included a series of indexes describing and evaluating reference publications on a variety of topics and was meant to help the aspiring librarian learn about the most useful and reliable reference sources available on the market. The American Library Association published her book as Guide to the Study and Use of Reference Books: A Manual for Librarians, Teachers and Students. Kroeger produced two editions, one in 1902 and a second in 1907.

After Kroeger's death in 1909 the American Library Association asked Isadore Gilbert Mudge, head of the reference department for the library at Columbia University, to take over the project. Mudge started a trend at Columbia that would last for several decades, pushing their reference staff to essentially “lead four lives-as editors, administrators, collection builders, and front-line reference specialists” (Plotnik, 130). Much of the work for the Guide was accomplished alongside the normal reference work duties of collection development and assisting students and professors with their research requests. During this time the indexes on reference materials expanded and the book went through two title changes: New Guide to Reference Books in 1923 and Guide to Reference Books in 1929.

After taking the volume through three decades and four new editions, Mudge retired and passed the responsibility on to her successor at Columbia University, Constance Mabel Winchell. Winchell reorganized the book, classifying the indexes into different disciplines similar to the academic departments of a university. The indexes were greatly expanded under Winchell; when the eighth edition was published in 1967 it was quite a tome, including entries on some 7500 individual publications.

When Eugene P. Sheehy took over as head of reference at Columbia in 1967 he took on the Guide. Having worked as Winchell's assistant for several years Sheehy adopted her style, process of selection and organization as his own. He began issuing supplements to the Guide, with versions in 1968, 1970, and 1972. The supplements expanded on the entries of Winchell's eighth edition, adding indexes of material newly published or newly discovered. A new ninth edition, which required Sheehy and his two assistants to update and correct entries from Winchell's edition and add in material from their three supplements, was finally published in 1976. This ninth edition was the first version to include listings of early electronic databases. Sheehy continued editing and publishing supplements until he retired in 1986.

The editorship passed for the 10th edition supplement and the 11th edition to Robert Balay of the Association of College and Research Libraries' Choice magazine. No longer the vision of a lone individual, the Guide became an increasingly cooperative project as reference literature grew and as contributors were drawn from libraries around the country.

== Current developments ==
Use of the Guide became less and less frequent as research had turned more towards electronic databases such as EBSCOhost and JSTOR. The project to develop a 12th edition of the Guide as an online database was announced in 2000 under the editorship of Robert H. Kieft, then librarian at Haverford College (now college librarian at Occidental College). This online edition was published in 2009 and continually updated. It was the first to include listings of websites and was the first to be issued in electronic form. The online Guide's last general editor was Denise Beaubien Bennett, engineering librarian at the University of Florida's Marston Science Library.

ALA Publishing, in collaboration with the Guide to Reference Editorial Review Board, announced that, due to the "current business climate", the Guide to Reference online product had ceased taking further subscriptions and would be closed down on March 31, 2016.
