= François Barrême =

French mathematician

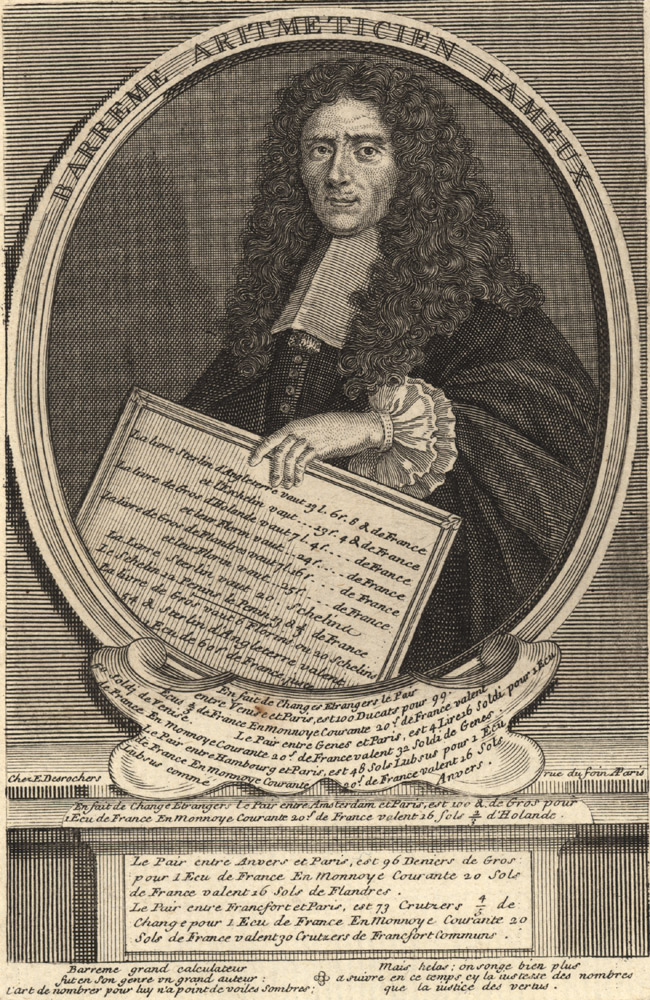
Engraving of François Barrême by Étienne-Jehandier Desrochers.

François of François-Bertrand Barrême (July 7, 1638 or 1640 - 1703) was a French mathematician and considered as one of the pioneers of modern accounting.

== Works ==
Works by François Barrême include:

- Les Comptes faits : ou Le Tarif général de toutes les monnoyes (1669)
- Le Livre facile pour apprendre l’arithmétique de soy-même & sans maître (1672)
- La géométrie servant au mesurage et à l'arpentage: ouvrage si facile & si commode, que par la seule addition on peut mesurer toutes sortes de terres, bois & bâtimens, et généralement toutes figures & superficies pour irregulieres qu'elles puissent estre (1673)
- Le Grand Banquier : ou le Livre des monnoyes étrangères réduites en monnoyes de France (1685)
- Le Lire nécessaire pour les comptables, avocats, notaires, procureurs, négociants, et généralement à toute sorte de conditions (1694)
