= William Katz (librarian) =

American librarian, author, and editor (1924 – 2004)

William Armstrong Katz
- Born: July 6, 1924; Seattle, Washington, United States
- Died: September 12, 2004 (aged 80)
- Education: M.A., University of Washington, 1956; PhD, University of Chicago, 1965
- Occupations: Librarian; author; editor
- Spouse: Linda Sternberg Katz
- Children: 2

William Armstrong "Bill" Katz (July 6, 1924 – September 12, 2004) was an American librarian, author, and editor. He was a professor of Library Science at the State University of New York at Albany. An internationally recognized authority on reference service, he is best known for his two-volume textbook, Introduction to Reference Work, first published in 1969, as well as his editorship of various scholarly publications.

== Early life and education ==
William Armstrong Katz was born on July 6, 1924 in Seattle, Washington. He received his B.A. in Journalism from the University of Washington in 1947. He received his M.A. in Library Science from the same school in 1956. He received his PhD from the University of Chicago Graduate Library School in 1965.

=== Military service ===
Katz served in the U.S. Army from 1942-1945 during World War II and received a Bronze Star.

== Career ==
After graduating with his B.A., Katz worked as a reporter for several newspapers on the West Coast, including the Vancouver Columbian, the Oakland Post Enquirer, and the San Francisco News from 1948 to 1950. He was an editor for the Daly City Record from 1950 to 1954 and a reporter for the Seattle Times from 1954 to 1957.

Katz's library career began at the Kings County Library in Washington where he worked as a reference librarian from 1975 to 1960. He then worked for the American Library Association's Editorial Department in Chicago until 1964. Katz' first academic position was associate professor of library science at the University of Kentucky which he held until 1966. The same year, he because a professor at the School of Information Science and Policy (SISP) at the State University of New York at Albany where he would remain for the rest of his academic career.

=== Author and editor ===
Katz was editor of the journal Reference Quarterly for 10 years, during which time he oversaw its transition from a short newsletter to a leading scholarly journal. He served as the editor for the Journal of Education for Librarianship from 1964 to 1972. He was editor of The Reference Librarian in 1981 and The Acquisitions Librarian in 1987.

Katz wrote more than 50 books and articles during his career. In 1969, Katz published his two-volume Introduction to Reference Work which quickly became a standard textbook in reference education. The 8th edition was published in 2002. It has been translated into Chinese and Japanese. He also created and edited the reference text Magazines for Libraries, first published in 1969, which is in its 29th print edition as of 2021.

Katz also served as editor and compiler of over 40 works on various topics in library science, poetry, and the history of books. In 1991, he and his wife, Linda Sternberg Katz, published The Columbia Granger's Guide to Poetry Anthologies. Katz also published on bibliographic history, including Cuneiform to Computer: A History of Reference Sources (1998) and A History of Book Illustrations: 29 Points of View (1994).

== Death and legacy ==
Katz died on September 12, 2004. According to close friends and family members, he requested there be no memorial services or obituaries. An announcement of his death was posted on the School of Information Science and Policy's website on October 11, followed by an obituary in the November 15 issue of Library Journal.

By the time of his death, Katz was an internationally known authority on reference service. In 2004, the then editors of Reference Quarterly wrote of his Introduction to Reference Work: "It is a rare student of reference and information service who has not developed substantial familiarity with Katz's two-volume work; many graduates keep a copy of 'Katz' at their sides far into their professional careers."

Stephanie Maatta published a comprehensive bibliography of Katz's writings in 2007.

== Awards and honors ==
- Seattle Hist. Award of Merit, 1965
- Isadore Gilbert Mudge Citation for Reference Librarianship, ALA, 1973
- Distinguished Alumni Award, University of Washington, 1977
- Louis Shores-Oryx Press Award, 1993
