= Alice B. Kroeger =

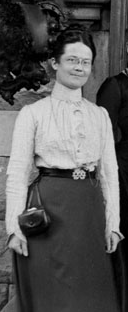
- Born: May 2, 1864; St. Louis
- Died: October 31, 1909 (aged 45); Philadelphia
- Occupation: Librarian

Alice Bertha Kroeger (May 2, 1864 – October 31, 1909) was an American librarian, educator, and author. A student of Melvil Dewey, she founded the third library school in the United States at Drexel University in 1892 and served as its director until her death in 1909. She published the Guide to the Study and Use of Reference Books in 1902 which, over the course of its eleven print editions, was the foremost guide to reference sources in the United States throughout the 20th century.

== Early life and education ==
Alice Bertha Kroeger was born on May 2, 1864 in St. Louis, Missouri to Adolph Ernst Kroeger and Eliza Bertha Curren. After graduating from St. Louis public schools in 1881 she took a job as a clerk in the St. Louis Public Library. She worked for the St. Louis Public Library from 1882 to 1889 under Frederick M. Crunden. At the 1889 meeting of the American Library Association in St. Louis, Kroeger was recognized by noted librarian Charles Ammi Cutter who conveyed her suggestions about the relationship between cataloging and public service. That year, she enrolled in the New York State Library School at Albany, where she studied under Melvil Dewey. She left school briefly in 1890 to accept a cataloging position at the St. Louis Public Library, but she returned to school the next year. She graduated in July 1891 and received her diploma "with honor".

== Career ==
In 1891, James MacAlister, president of the newly established Drexel Institute of Art, Science and Industry, asked Melvil Dewey to recommend a librarian for the institute. Dewey named Kroeger as his first choice. In the fall of 1892, Kroeger founded a library school at Drexel, the third in the United States. The school's curriculum was modeled after Dewey's and included rigorous entrance examinations. Kroeger served as the school's director and as an instructor for the next 17 years until her death.

In 1902, Kroeger published the Guide to the Study and Use of Reference Books: A Manual for Librarians, Teachers and Students (American Library Association) which quickly became the definitive list of reference titles in the field. A second edition was published in 1908, increasing the number of included titles from 800 to 1200.

Kroeger was an active and early member of the American Library Association (ALA). In 1889, she became member number 728. She served on the Executive Committee of the Pennsylvania Library Club and was elected vice-president from 1895 to 1896. She lectured at the University of Pennsylvania on the subject of bibliography. She served on the ALA Committee on Library Training along with four other library school directors trained by Dewey. In 1907, she was elected a fellow of the American Library Institute. In 1908, she was elected chairman of the Catalog Section of the ALA and also served on the ALA Council as recorder.

In 1908, with Sarah W Cottell, Kroeger published Aids to Book Selection for the ALA Library Handbook series, an updated and expanded version of a pamphlet originally published by the Pennsylvania Free Library Commission in 1903.

== Death and legacy ==
Cheney was long suspected of neglecting her health for her professional obligations. She died on October 31, 1909, at the age of 45, due to "neruasthenia or pernicious anemia." Her death came as a surprise to the greater library community.

In 1925, the library school at the Drexel Institute established the Alice B. Kroeger Memorial Scholarship.

Kroeger's genre-defining Guide to the Study and Use of Reference Books would continue under the editorship of Isadore Mudge in 1917 as the Guide to Reference Books. The Guide would see eleven print editions and five chief editors over the next seventy-five years, becoming known as "the premier compendium of reference materials for North American libraries."

== Publications ==
- Study and Use of Reference Books (1908)
