= Constance Mabel Winchell =

American librarian (1896–1983)

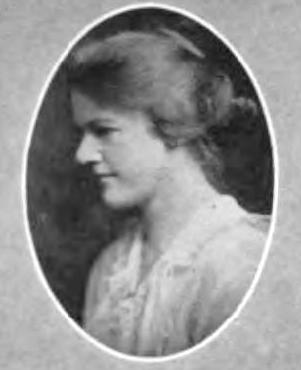
- Born: November 2, 1896; Northampton
- Died: May 23, 1983 (aged 86)
- Alma mater: University of Michigan; Columbia University School of Library Service
- Occupation: Librarian
- Employer: Columbia University

Constance Mabel Winchell (November 2, 1896 – May 23, 1983) was an American librarian. Winchell worked at Columbia University for thirty-eight years before retiring in 1962. She is best remembered for producing the seventh and eighth editions of the Guide to Reference Books. In 1999, American Libraries included Constance Winchell in a list of 100 most influential individuals in the field of library and information science.

== Early life ==
Constance Winchell was born on November 2, 1896. Her family lived in Northampton, Massachusetts. Tragically, Winchell's father died early, when Constance was only seven years old. This left her mother as the sole provider for Winchell and her three brothers. Despite these difficulties, Winchell's education was never jeopardized.

Winchell's family valued learning and education. Many of her relatives were college graduates and scholars, despite the relative rarity of obtaining an advanced degree in the early twentieth century. Winchell's future career was further influenced by her aunt Mabel Winchell who was a librarian in New Hampshire. Additionally, her mother occasionally rented rooms to lecturers from a local college to support the family. The presence of these educated borders further encouraged the Winchell children to explore the world of ideas and academic pursuits.

== Education ==
Winchell attended a private high school called the Capen School. Later that year, her family moved to Ann Arbor, Michigan. In Ann Arbor, Winchell enrolled in classes at the University of Michigan. During the summers of her junior and senior years at Michigan, she attended library science lectures, which were conducted by Michigan's library director William Warner Bishop. Winchell earned her Bachelor of Arts degree in 1918. With Bishop's encouragement, Winchell enrolled in the library school program offered at the New York Public Library the following year. Although the program was two years, the second year was optional. Due to monetary concerns Winchell opted to complete only the first year of the program. She received a certificate in 1920.

In 1928, after Winchell had accepted a position at Columbia University, she enrolled in Columbia University School of Library Service. Her thesis was called “Locating Books for Interlibrary Loan.” The essay encompassed much of the knowledge that her employer and professor Isadore Gilbert Mudge had acquired while supplying interlibrary loans over the course of her career. Winchell's essay was well received upon its publication in 1930, and was recognized by many librarians to be one of the definitive books on interlibrary loans for many years. Winchell received a master's degree in Library Service in 1930.

== Early career ==
Winchell knew early in life that she wanted to become a librarian. Her first library job was obtained in the University of Michigan library during her undergraduate years. She helped to improve the library catalog and provided reference services at some of the departmental libraries. Her first professional job was as the librarian of Duluth Minnesota's Central High School. She also taught ancient history classes while she was employed at Central High. Winchell only held this position for a year, before moving to New York to attend library school.

After receiving her Library Science certificate, Winchell took at job with the United States Merchant Marine. This position required Winchell to travel extensively on the coast of the Eastern United States, where she was responsible for creating- and acquiring books for- lighthouse libraries. This position lasted for five months, at which time Winchell moved back to Ann Arbor to join the University of Michigan library staff. During the three years that Winchell was employed by Michigan she worked in the cataloging department, and later as a reference assistant. Winchell next accepted a job at the American Library in Paris, France. Here, she spent a year and a half working as the head catalogue librarian.

== Columbia and later career ==
In the autumn of 1925, Winchell returned to the United States to accept a job at the Columbia University Library. Upon the publication of her master's thesis “Locating Books for Interlibrary Loan” in 1930, Winchell was made responsible for Columbia's interlibrary loans. Three years later, in 1933, Winchell became the assistant reference librarian. In 1941, Winchell was promoted to the head of reference. Winchell continued to serve as Columbia's head reference librarian until her retirement on June 30, 1962.

In 1960 Winchell was the second person to receive the Isadore Gilbert Mudge Citation for Distinguished Contributions to Reference Librarianship. The award was presented by the American Library Association Reference Service Division. This accolade was bestowed upon Winchell as a result of her work developing Columbia's reference collection and for her 1930 thesis book “Locating Books for Interlibrary Loan.”

Winchell contributed to the library profession in other ways. She taught library science classes while working at Columbia. She was an active member of the American Library Association for many years, eventually obtaining membership on the organization's council; and she wrote semi-annual articles for College & Research Libraries, the first of which appeared in 1951.

== The Guide to Reference Books ==
Winchell is best remembered for publishing the seventh and eighth editions of the Guide to Reference Books. The Guide to Reference Books was a bibliography of more than 8,000 books that was an important resource for developing the reference collections of many libraries. The books included in the Guide were about many different subjects, and they were in a variety of languages. The first edition of the Guide was published by Alice Bertha Kroeger in 1902. After publishing a second edition, Kroeger bequeathed the project to Isadore Gilbert Mudge. Mudge was responsible for producing the third through the sixth editions of the Guide to Reference Books. She also produced five supplements to each edition, which were published in Library Journal. Mudge was Constance Winchell's boss, professor, and colleague at Columbia University. Beginning with one of the supplements to the fifth edition, Winchell helped Mudge to edit the Guide. When Mudge retired in 1941, her position as Columbia's head reference librarian was vacated. Winchell was promoted to this position, and she assumed editorship of the Guide to Reference Books at the same time.

Winchell edited and published the seventh edition of the Guide in 1951. This edition expanded the book in many subjects, but most apparently in “psychology, fine arts, and history.” She produced four supplements to the seventh edition, which appeared in 1954, 1956, 1960, and 1963. The eighth edition was published in 1967, five years after Winchell's official retirement from Columbia University. The eighth edition further expanded the contents of the Guide; it included 2,000 new books. Winchell also reorganized the structure of the Guide to include five general subject areas, as opposed to the thirteen areas included in earlier editions.

The importance of Winchell's contributions to the Guide to Reference Books cannot be overstated. In the 1960s Winchell's name became synonymous with the Guide, and librarians frequently referred to the book as “Winchell.” Furthermore, the changes that Winchell made to the guide would impact “two generations of reference [librarians].”

== Later life ==
As early as 1924, when she accepted the cataloging position in the American library in Paris, Winchell recognized a desire to travel. But she was not able to indulge in this passion until late in her career, and after her retirement from Columbia. Not long before retiring, she took a four-month leave from Columbia to travel extensively through Asia. She also visited such disparate foreign lands as Central and South America, the Middle East, and India.

In 1969 Winchell moved to New Paltz, New York. Winchell continued to reside in New Paltz until her death on May 23, 1983 at the age of 86.
