= Isadore Gilbert Mudge =

American librarian

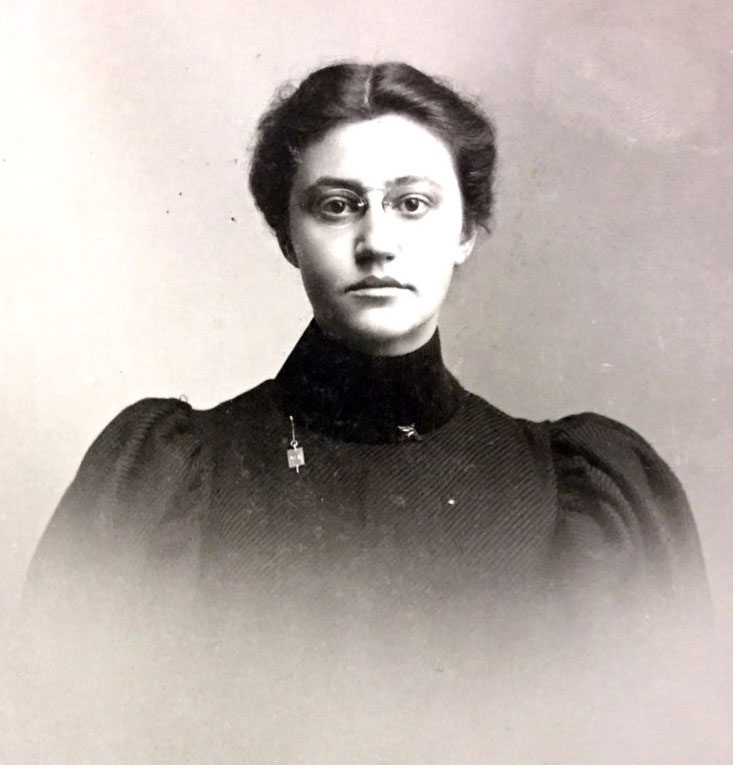
- Born: March 14, 1875; Brooklyn
- Died: May 16, 1957; Lutherville
- Education: Cornell University
- Occupation: Librarian
- Employers: Columbia University; University of Illinois Urbana-Champaign

Isadore Gilbert Mudge (March 14, 1875 – May 16, 1957) was ranked by the magazine American Libraries as one of the top 100 important leaders that libraries have had in the 20th century. Mudge was a defining influence on what a contemporary reference librarian is and was essential for helping organize and promote reference books for use in helping patrons find information and answers to questions.

The only biography that exists of Isadore Gilbert Mudge is a dissertation written by Columbia student, John N. Waddell, in 1973. In one portion he sums up what were her ideals, “Mudge’s professional concerns were not confined to the Columbia reference department….She was constantly concerned with the problems and tools bibliographical control in the widest possible area….but herself preached the gospel of cooperative bibliographic at home and abroad, by pen and by tongue.”

== Biography ==
Isadore Gilbert Mudge was raised in Brooklyn, New York, as the oldest child in her family. Her father was an attorney and her mother was the daughter of a University of Michigan librarian. She attended Brooklyn’s Adelphi Academy and then went to Cornell University for philosophy. She was elected to be a member of Phi Beta Kappa for being an outstanding student in her junior year. She was also a member of Kappa Alpha Theta, the first Greek fraternity for women. During her undergraduate studies she was motivated by Professor and Librarian George Lincoln Burr to pursue her own library degree. Mudge then went to Albany, New York, to attend the New York State Library School, where she received her “Bachelor of Library Science degree with distinction in 1900”, having studied under Dunkin Van Rensselaer Johnston. She never married or had children.

== Librarian ==
From her first job as a librarian, Mudge wanted library patrons to be able to access reference books and learn on an independent basis. Mudge’s first job was twofold; she “was the head reference librarian at the University of Illinois: Urbana and an associate professor at the University of Illinois Library School. For three years she maintained both positions. Mudge left the University of Illinois to become the head librarian at Bryn Mawr College. She considered herself an easterner and that may have been why she changed positions. She worked there for five years and spent the following three years working on writing, traveling to Europe, and from 1910 to 1911, Mudge also worked part-time as an instructor at Simmons College.

=== Columbia University ===
In 1911 Mudge was hired at Columbia University. The President of Columbia, Nicholas Murray Butler, became one of her earliest supporters. Butler found her “incredibly resourceful in meeting his varied reference and bibliographic needs.” She began to push for all libraries to have a reference section that would include at least “the possession of certain basic works, a dictionary, an encyclopedia, an atlas, a biographical dictionary” but hopefully would also include “a book of quotations, handbook of statistics, a state or government manual”.

Around 1927 she began working as an associate professor at Columbia’s new School of Library Services, teaching Bibliography and Bibliographic Methods. It was teaching this class she coined her phrase “material, mind and method”. She believed reference librarians should know the materials they dealt with, be intelligent with a high quality memory and be able to answer questions in a clear way including the source of material they were using. One of her students published an article in a 1937 Library Journal sharing these ideas. “Reviewing Mudge’s career at Columbia, Constance Mabel Winchell, Mudge’s protégée, said: ‘Probably no other one person has contributed so much to the raising the standards of reference collections and reference services in the libraries of this and other countries.’"

== Writing ==
Around the time Mudge came to Columbia, the American Library Association asked her to update Guide to Reference Books, which was desperately needing a supplement to go along with the original edition. She edited the guide through four editions over 20 years. This was an important book at that time to show new librarians what resources were available. This is what she is best known for. She also wrote articles for the Library Journal, worked on editing and creating bibliographies, dictionaries and other reference materials. Quite often her writings were assisted by Minnie Earl Sears, a colleague and companion. Some of Mudge's writings are still found at Columbia University.

== Legacy ==
Every year since 1958, the Reference and User Services Association, a division of the American Library Association, and EBSCO sponsor the Isadore Gilbert Mudge Award. The recipient is someone who has made a difference in reference librarianship that year. The chosen winner receives $5,000 and a citation.
