= Ralph Remington =

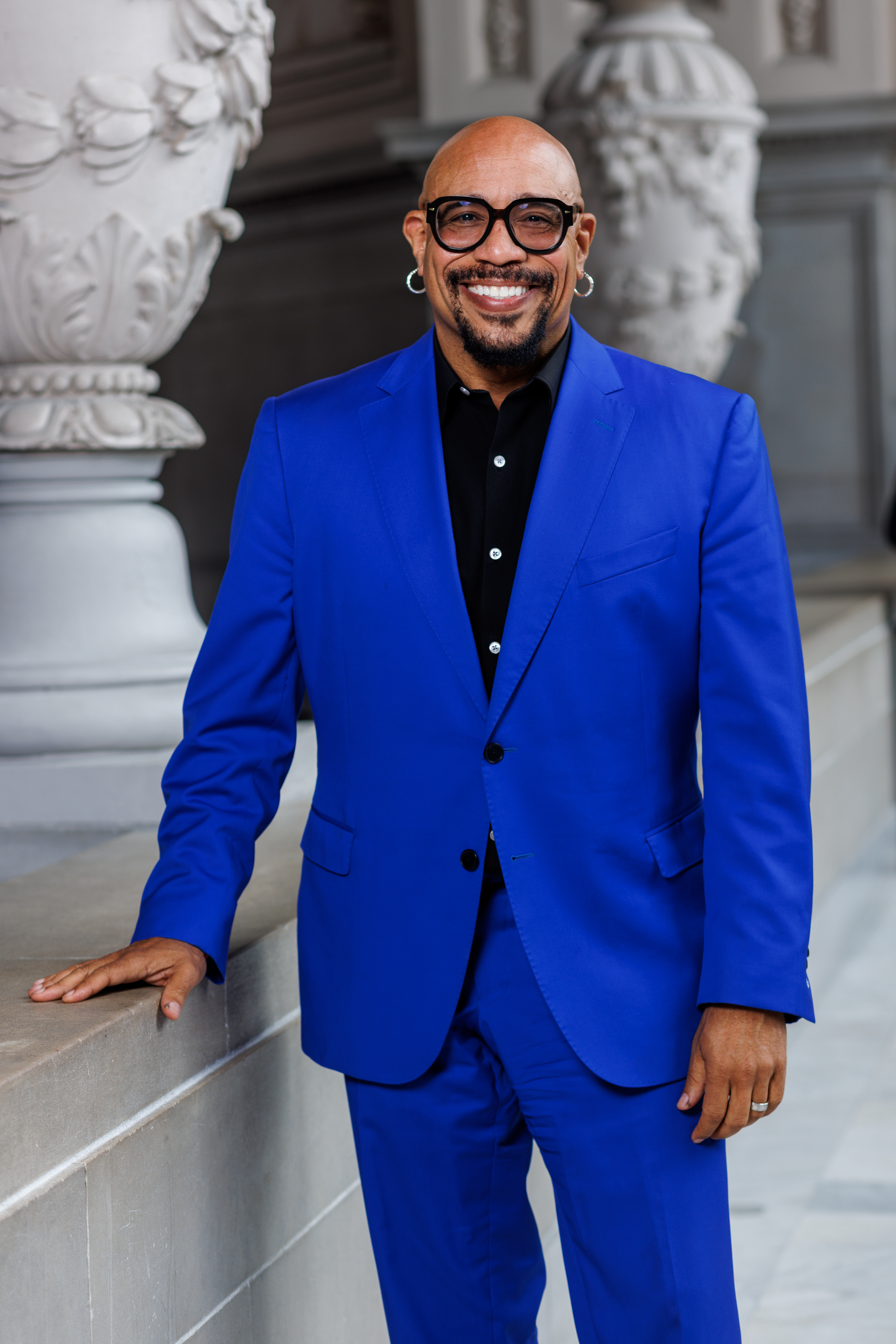

Member of the Minneapolis City Council from the 10th ward
- In office January 2, 2006 – January 4, 2010
- Preceded by: Dan Niziolek
- Succeeded by: Meg Tuthill

Director of Cultural Affairs for the San Francisco Arts Commission
- Incumbent
- Assumed office January 2021
- Preceded by: Tom DeCaigny

Personal details
- Born: January 2, 1963 (age 63) Philadelphia, Pennsylvania, US
- Education: Howard University

Ralph Remington (born January 2, 1963) is an American former politician, artist, theater director and writer. He was appointed by Mayor London Breed as Director of Cultural Affairs for the San Francisco Arts Commission and the City and County of San Francisco in January 2021 and retired in 2026 amidst public scrutiny. Remington is the former Deputy Director for Arts and Culture for the City of Tempe, Arizona. He also had artistic responsibility for the Tempe Center for the Arts. Remington is the former Western Regional Director/Assistant Executive Director of Actors' Equity Association. In 2010 he became the Director of Theater and Musical Theater for the National Endowment for the Arts. He currently resides in San Francisco, California. Remington has written seven feature screenplays and two plays.

He is founding producing artistic director of Pillsbury House Theatre, in Minneapolis Minnesota where he was also an elected member of the Minneapolis City Council. He served one term from 2006 through 2010.

== Early life ==
Ralph Remington grew up in West Philadelphia. His parents are Ralph and Sadie Satterthwaite. He has two younger siblings. He attended Anderson Elementary School, Julia R. Masterman School and Turner Middle School. He was also a student at Central High School (Philadelphia) before leaving in his second year for The Philadelphia High School for the Creative and Performing Arts. Remington is a member of the first graduating class of The Philadelphia High School for the Creative and Performing Arts, in 1980. While in high school, he was a TV moderator/host for the series Perspective Youth on the ABC-TV affiliate WPVI-TV in Philadelphia. He changed his name professionally from Satterthwaite to Remington upon joining the acting unions in the 1980s. His first acting gig under an Equity contract was Soulful Scream of a Chosen Son at The Philadelphia Festival Theater for New Plays. While living in New York City, he was a member of the company Thunder in the Light.

After receiving his Bachelor of Fine Arts degree from Howard University, Remington enlisted in the US Army. He completed Basic Training at Fort Jackson. He was then sent to Communications School at Fort Gordon, in Augusta, Georgia. After graduation from Fort Gordon he received orders to report to McNair Kaserne 32nd Signal Battalion in Frankfurt, Germany in 1985. He was stationed in V Corps under the command of General Colin Powell. He lived in Frankfurt, Germany for two and a half years. He received an Honorable Discharge in 1988.

== Career ==
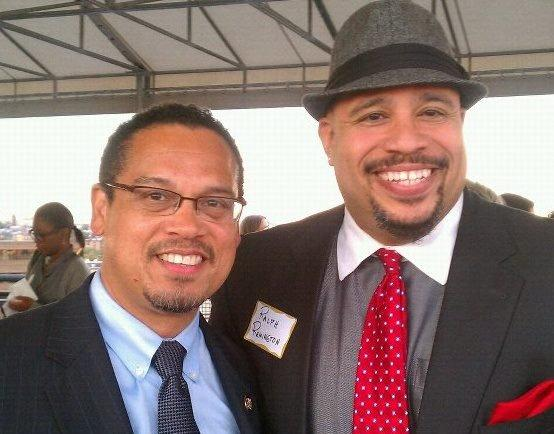
Remington with Representative Keith Ellison (DFL-MN)

Remington founded Pillsbury House Theatre out of the settlement house tradition of community collaboration. He served as Pillsbury's producing artistic director, managing a $500,000 budget. He also selected and oversaw a four-to-six play annual series; founded Breaking Ice, a touring multiracial, socio-political improv company for youth and adults; and created the Chicago Avenue Project where children write and perform original plays with professional actors. The program received a Coming Up Taller award in 2005. Presented by the First Lady Laura Bush on behalf of the President's Committee on the Arts and Humanities, Coming Up Taller awards recognize outstanding community arts and humanities programs that celebrate the creativity of America's young people. In addition, Remington has directed at Intermedia Arts, Painted Bride Art Center, The Southern Theater and Walker Art Center.

Remington is also a former member of the Guthrie Theater acting company, in Minneapolis, Minnesota with Rainn Wilson in The Venetian Twins.

In the spring of 2002, Remington directed a production of Amiri Baraka's Dutchman at the Source Theater in Washington.

He was the executive director of the Media Artists Resource Center in St. Paul where he was responsible for fundraising and strategic planning and engineered a successful merger with the Independent Filmmaker Project.

Remington ran to represent Minneapolis's Ward 10 on the Minneapolis City Council, defeating Scott Persons 55%–45% in the 2005 election to replace retiring incumbent Dan Niziolek. Remington's term began January 2, 2006. He did not run for reelection in 2009 and was succeeded by Meg Tuthill at the end of his term on January 4, 2010.

Remington has directed, produced and acted in over 50 plays. He served as artistic associate and director of community engagement with Arena Stage, overseeing all of the company's outreach and education programs and a staff of 19, managing a $750,000 budget. While at Arena, he led the Living Stage Theater Company, created and toured a devised work piece called America: Work in Progress, and directed Dael Orlandersmith's critically acclaimed The Gimmick and Talking With by Jane Martin.

In January 2014, Remington become the western regional director for Actors' Equity Association, the union of professional actors.

Remington served as the Director for Theater and Musical Theater at the National Endowment for the Arts. He was responsible for the grantmaking processes for theater and musical theater, developing partnerships to advance the theater field as a whole, and leading large-scale theater projects such as the NEA's New Play Development Program. He was appointed by NEA chairman and Broadway theatre producer, Rocco Landesman.

Remington was Director of Cultural Affairs for the San Francisco Arts Commission from January 2021 until February 2, 2026, when he made a surprise announcement at a public Commission meeting that he was stepping back from his role as Director of Cultural Affairs. He is the former Deputy Director of Arts and Culture for the City of Tempe, AZ. In that capacity he functioned as Artistic Director for the Tempe Center for the Arts. Remington served as the Western Regional Director/Assistant Executive Director of Actors' Equity Association (AEA).

In 2026, the San Francisco Chronicle reported on criticism surrounding Remington’s leadership of the San Francisco Arts Commission during a period of agency restructuring and staff departures. Former staff members and arts advocates alleged that Remington was frequently absent from the office, constituent meetings, and grant recipient programming despite the city’s in-office work requirements.

== Pillsbury House Theatre ==
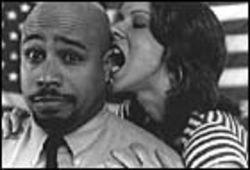
Ralph Remington & Jennifer Blagen in Dutchman, by LeRoi Jones director Brian Goranson (1998)

- Yacub: Mad Scientist or Genius? by Homer Jackson director Ralph Remington (1992)
- Statements After an Arrest Under the Immorality Act by Athol Fugard director Ralph Remington (1992)
- Gerry Girouard Dancers in The Shadows of the Diamond Realm (1992)
- Danny and the Deep Blue Sea by John Patrick Shanley director Ralph Remington (1993)
- Slow Dance on the Killing Ground by William Hanley director Ralph Remington (1993)
- Power Tools by Xavier Leonard director Ralph Remington (1993)
- The Taking of Miss Janie by Ed Bullins director Ralph Remington (1993)
- Azande in Les Mannequins by Azande director Azande (1993)
- The Colors of Desire by Alexs Pate and David Mura director Ralph Remington (1994)
- Savage in Limbo by John Patrick Shanley director Ralph Remington (1994)
- Thoughts from a Cultural Revolutionary by Ralph Remington director Ralph Remington (1994)
- Combination Skin by Lisa Jones director Dawn Renee Jones (1994)
- MultiCultiBoho Sideshow by Alexs Pate director Ralph Remington (1994)
- This City of Dreams by Walter Allen Bennett, Jr. director Ralph Remington (1995)
- The Hittite Empire in Undersiege Stories by the Hittite Empire (1995)
- The Punic Wars by Sirius B (1995)
- Extremities by William Mastrosimone director Ralph Remington (1996)
- Sexual Perversity in Chicago by David Mamet director Dwight Callaway (1996)
- Bring the Children Home by Marci Rendon directors Noel Raymond & Heidi Hunter Batz (1996)
- Streamers by David Rabe director Noel Raymond (1997)
- Women of Manhattan by John Patrick Shanley director Ralph Remington (1997)
- The Brunette Breck Girl by Heidi Arnesan director Heidi Arnesan (1997)
- Burn This by Lanford Wilson director Ralph Remington (1997)
- The Sign in Sidney Brustein's Window by Lorraine Hansberry directors Dwight Callaway & Ralph Remington (1998)
- Where I'm At conceived, developed and directed by Heidi Hunter Batz (1998)
- Dutchman by LeRoi Jones director Brian Goranson (1998)
- A Streetcar Named Desire by Tennessee Williams director Leah C. Gardiner (1999)
- Shelter (staged reading) by Dwight Hobbes director Ralph Remington (1999)

== Personal life ==
Remington was married to German designer Andrea Moseler in 1988. They divorced in 1991. He has been with current spouse Mary Remington since 2000. He has two step-daughters. Remington has also lived in New York City, Santa Monica, California, and Culver City, California, as an actor and screenwriter.
