= E. J. Josey =

African-American librarian (1924–2009)

- Josey c. 1960

President of the American Library Association
- In office 1984–1985
- Preceded by: Brooke E. Sheldon
- Succeeded by: Beverly P. Lynch

Personal details
- Born: Elonnie Junius Josey; January 20, 1924 Norfolk, Virginia, US
- Died: July 3, 2009 (aged 85) Washington, North Carolina, US
- Education: Howard University; Columbia University; University at Albany, SUNY
- Occupation: Librarian and a&2-ctivist

Elonnie J. Josey (January 20, 1924 – July 3, 2009) was an African-American activist and librarian. Josey was the first chair of the Black Caucus of the American Library Association, having been instrumental in its formation in 1970; served as president of the American Library Association from 1984 to 1985; and was the author of over 400 books and other publications.

== Early life ==
Josey was born Elonnie Junius Josey in Norfolk, Virginia, to Willie and Frances Bailey Josey. His mother completed teacher-training school and taught for one year before marrying Josey's father, a WWI veteran who worked as a laborer at the Norfolk Naval Shipyard in Portsmouth. Josey credits his mother for encouraging him to pursue reading and creativity. The Josey family moved to the Mount Hermon section of Portsmouth, Virginia, shortly after Josey's birth, where he was raised with four siblings. The family attended the Celestial Baptist Church, where Josey "found his love of God and music". Josey attended the segregated Mount Hermon Elementary School and I. C. Norcom High School, where he excelled academically.

Josey's father died when he was a sophomore in high school, and Josey graduated early to earn money as a dishwasher, porter, and stock clerk as well as by playing the piano and organ at neighborhood churches. He was drafted into the U.S. Army on May 18, 1943, and served in an all-Black squadron in the South as an assistant to chaplains and as an organist. Josey was able to use a non-segregated library in the army and he noted, "The opportunity to read a wide variety of materials in the Army caused me to continue my quest for knowledge and revived my desire for a college education". His army service ended in 1946.

Josey enrolled in Howard University in 1947 and graduated in 1949, majoring in history. He received his master's in History from Columbia University in 1950 and a master's in librarianship from the University at Albany, SUNY in 1953 being the second African American to do so. While at Columbia, Josey worked as a desk assistant in the Journalism Library and in several other jobs in departmental libraries, and was "encouraged to pursue librarianship as a career by his supervisor, Basil Miller". Josey joined the American Library Association in 1952 but like other African American librarians, his application to join the Georgia Library Association was rejected. In 1965, he would become the first African American librarian of the Georgia Library Association after he led a protest against the Southern state library associations.

== Career ==
Immediately after graduating from library school in 1953, Josey was recruited into a position in a branch library at the Free Library of Philadelphia by Emerson Greenaway. With support from his minister, Reverend Leon Sullivan, Josey successfully advocated to be transferred to a position that could make use of his master's degree in history as part of the social science section. Unfortunately, Josey experienced racism from existing staff with lesser credentials who resented his advanced degree and the ability to answer questions from patrons that his colleagues could not answer, and he was assigned clerical tasks beneath his abilities. As a result, Josey stayed just one year at the Free Library before deciding to leave the profession, accepting a position as a history instructor in social sciences at Savannah State College in Savannah, Georgia, where he remained for one year.

Josey was recruited into the position of assistant professor and Director of the Library at Delaware State College in Dover, Delaware in September, 1955 as part of a re-accreditation effort, and was able to obtain certification for the library two years later. A major initiative was the "Library Culture Program", which featured authors such as Langston Hughes, Kay Boyle, and Elizabeth Vroman. He remained at Delaware State until 1959. In this position Josey also began his career as an author, writing a series of articles while in the position about library management, library accreditation, and library use. He also began his first position as editor, of the Delaware Library Association Bulletin—the first African American in the role. In recognition of Josey's many accomplishments in the state, he was appointed to a statewide school librarian certification revision committee by the Delaware State Department of Public Instruction. While at Delaware, Josey also met and married Dorothy Johnson and became a father to Elaine Jacqueline Josey, his only child.

In 1959, Josey was invited to return to Savannah State College by the president to oversee the building of a new library facility, and he served as chief librarian and associate professor there until 1996. During Josey's tenure, he implemented two programs that "attracted large numbers of whites into the Savannah State College campus for the first time"; as a result, the library was recognized in 1962 and 1964 by the American Library Association's John Cotton Dana Library Public Relations award. Josey was also able to increase library circulation from 20 to 39 percent as the result of a multi-year summer reading program to improve incoming students' independent reading. Josey was the faculty advisor for the debate team and Alpha Phi Omega fraternity, and supported students' founding of a local chapter of the NAACP.

In 1966, Josey joined the New York State Education Department in its Division of Library Development as an Associate in the Bureau of Academic and Research Libraries. In this position he "developed and improved services for the 216 academic and research libraries in New York. In 1968 he was promoted to Chief of the Bureau of Academic and Research Libraries and held that position until 1976 when he was appointed Chief, Bureau of Specialist Library Services, New York State Library. While in these roles, Josey implemented the New York State interlibrary loan system, providing access to 72,000 libraries around the world.

=== Educator for Library and Information Science ===
The next phase of Josey's career involved education for librarianship. From 1970 until his retirement in 1995, Josey served on the North Carolina Central University's library school advisory council, supporting student recruitment and faculty research; mentoring students; and enhancing collections. In 1986, he was recruited to the University of Pittsburgh School of Library and Information Science as a senior professor, where he continued his civil rights activities and became even more well known for mentorship, teaching, scholarship, and recruitment. During Josey's first five years, the number of minority students increased from three to twenty-seven. He went on to receive emeritus status at the University of Pittsburgh.

=== Research and scholarship ===
Josey authored more than 400 articles in library, educational, and history journals, and authored or edited thirteen books in the fields of education, history, and library science. Several works collected together and amplified the experiences of African American Librarians. The Black Librarian in America, published in 1970, is often noted as his seminal work. The book collects twenty-five autobiographical essays, including pioneers such as Virginia Lacy Jones, Augusta Baker, Binnie Tate Wilkin, A. P. Marshall, Miles Jackson, and Robert Wedgeworth. The book addressed "the widespread existence of racism in the profession and incorporated stories of segregation, bias, discrimination, and ignorance about Black librarianship." In The Black Librarian in America Revisited, published almost 25 years later, Josey collected thirty biographical and topical essays, including some authors from the original collection. The Handbook of Black Librarianship, co-edited with Ann Allen Shockley, was said by Josey to be his most prized work. The second edition, published in 2000, was co-edited with Marva L. DeLoach. Both editions provide insight into the critical issues confronted by African American Librarians. The chapter "Discrimination and Affirmative Action: Concerns for Black Librarians and Library Workers," included commentaries from twenty-three prominent librarians who "described frustration with being overlooked for promotions and director positions".

Josey served as editor of The Bookmark from 1976 to 1986, and as contributing editor to "Afro-Americans in New York Life and History." He also served on Multicultural Review's educational advisory committee.

== Activities in professional associations ==
Active in the field of human rights, he was a life member of the National Association for the Advancement of Colored People (NAACP). He was elected vice president of the Albany, New York Branch in 1980 and 1981, and served as president from 1982 to 1986. He also served as President of the Albany Branch of the Association for the Study of Afro-American Life and History. Active in community affairs, he also served as a member of the Board of Directors of the Albany County Opportunity, Inc., the local anti-poverty agency for four years.

Josey became a member of the American Library Association in 1952 after entering library school, and attended his first conference in 1957. At the 1964 annual conference, he authored the resolution forbidding Association officers and staff from participating in state associations "which are unable to meet fully the requirements of chapter status in ALA." This action led to the integration of the library association of several Southern states, and in 1965, he became the first Black librarian to be accepted as a member of the Georgia Library Association. In The Black Librarian in America (1970) Josey recalled the 1964 annual conference:

Much to my chagrin, the Mississippi Library Association was honored there for its National Library Week Activities. I exploded! I was seething with anger, for I remembered that three civil rights workers-Andrew Goodman, James Chaney, and Michael Schwerner had been murdered and lay dead and buried somewhere in Mississippi, their bodies not yet discovered. I also remembered that the Mississippi Library Association had withdrawn from ALA rather than give membership to Negro Librarians.

Josey was a key leader along with Effie Lee Morris and others in the formation of the Black Caucus of the American Library Association, which formed in 1970; Josey was elected as the first chairman. He is now honored by having scholarships awarded in his name to African American library school students.

As an ALA member, Josey partnered with Clara Stanton Jones during her ALA presidency to object vigorously to the ALA film The Speaker due to its racist subject matter, and with cataloger and activist Sanford Berman to protest negative terminology in the Library of Congress Subject Headings. Josey and Berman continued this work for 20 years. Josey was also known for helping other librarians advance in professional associations; for example, he encouraged future ALA President Patricia G. Schuman to give her first speech and nominated her to run for ALA Council.

Josey was first elected to the ALA Council, the policy making body of the Association in 1970 and served until the summer of 2000, a period of 29 years. In 1979, he was elected to a four-year term on the ALA Executive Board. From 1980 to 1982, he served as Chair of the Cultural Minorities Task Force of the National Commission on Libraries and Information Science. Having served on numerous ALA Committees, he chaired the ALA Committee on Pay Equity, the ALA Committee on Legislation, and the ALA International Relations Committee several times. Josey was nominated to the position of vice president and president elect in 1983.

Josey was the President of ALA in 1984–85. In his inaugural address on June 27, 1984, Josey articulated his presidential vision:

The public good, in an even broader sense of the general welfare, is closely related to progress for libraries. In a time of attack on the basic freedoms and economic well-being of the most vulnerable sections of populations, professional groups must recognize their stake in the outcome of that attack and their responsibilities to support the freedoms and welfare of these people. Librarians therefore need to integrate their goals with the goals of greatest importance of the American people, e.g., the preservation of basic democratic liberties, the enlargement of equal opportunity for women and minorities, and the continuance of earlier national planning to raise the level of the educational and economic wellbeing of greater numbers of the population.

In the same address, Josey went on to add: "The information industry has the technology to control information, but its price tag on information distribution and its profit goal create a bias in what information is made available and how it is dispensed. Only the nonprofit organization, the library, dedicated to a total community service goal with trained experts, librarians, running the operation can provide the full scope of information for the total population in a fair and objective manner."

As president, Josey was noted for building coalitions and partnerships and created innovative conference programs on the topic of coalition building. He also appointed key committees on pay equity, government information, and library services to minorities. Another highlight of his presidency was the joint meeting of BCALA and the Kenya Library Association for a weeklong seminar

Josey was also a member of the Association for Library and Information Science Education and in 1990 presented a report at the Board of Directors meeting on behalf of a committee he led at the request of president Miles J. Jackson "to explore the state of affairs in ethnic, multicultural, and humanistic concerns in LIS." This report led to the establishment of the Multicultural, Ethnic, and Humanistic Concerns Special Interest Group of ALISE, which continues to this day in the form of the Equity and Social Justice special interest Group.

=== International librarianship ===
Josey was a staunch advocate of international librarianship and in 1977, ALA President Eric Moon appointed Josey as chair of the ALA International Relations Committee, where he "directed a series of hearings that led to the adoption of ALA's first formal policy on international relations. In the spring of 1987, he was elected to a 4-year term on the board of directors of the Freedom to Read Foundation and again chaired the ALA International Relations Committee from 1987 to 1990. In this tenure he revised ALA's policies to encourage donation of materials to libraries in developing countries and protested against apartheid in South Africa, advocating that IFLA exclude South African apartheid associations and institutions as members. From 1990 to 1994 he served as the Chair of the ALA Legislation Committee. He returned to chair the ALA International Relations Committee for the next two years.

In May and June, 1987, Professor Josey lectured in three African countries, Ethiopia, Zimbabwe, and Zambia under the auspices of the United States Information Agency.

== Civil Rights activities ==
During the early 1960s, he participated in the Civil Rights struggle in Savannah (see The Black Librarian in America, pp. 308–11). While at Savannah State University, Josey supported students' founding of a local chapter of the NAACP, which participated in sit-ins. Josey also served on the executive board of the Savannah Branch of the NAACP under the leadership of W. W. Law and met Martin Luther King Jr. at a dinner in support of the NAACP.

In 1964 he carried the Civil Rights struggle into the American Library Association. In spite of the 1954 United States Supreme Court decision, which encouraged desegregation of libraries and ALA chapters, the ALA was slow in implementing integration of all of its southern chapters until Josey offered his resolution at the 1964 Conference, which prevented ALA officers and staff members from attending segregated state chapter meetings. The four remaining segregated chapters that denied membership to African-American librarians at that time were Alabama, Georgia, Louisiana, and Mississippi; and they integrated immediately. He is well known for his uncompromising opposition to any form of discrimination whether it is racial, gender, age or sexual orientation.

In 1965, Josey became the first African American librarian in the Georgia Library Association after, protesting the southern state library association he was finally allowed membership.

In 1981, Josey was elected vice president of the Albany, New York branch of the NAACP. and in 1986 received the NAACP President's Award from the Albany Board for "significant contributions to special populations in New York State".

Josey was one of the founders of the Equal Opportunity Authority in Savannah, Georgia, and contributed his leadership in the development of the Ralph Mark Gilbert Civil Rights Museum.

== Death ==
Josey died from natural causes in Washington, North Carolina at the age of 85, on July 3, 2009, and was survived by his daughter, Amina Josey Turner (née Elaine Jacqueline Josey) and her husband, Lawrence Richard Turner, III; his ex-wife, Rev. Dorothy J. Josey; six grandchildren, and ten great-grandchildren.

== Awards ==
Josey was recipient of numerous prestigious awards and was extensively commended with the following accolades:

- The American Library Association History Round Table presented him with its Journal of Library History Award for research on Edward Christopher Williams, the first African American to graduate from library school in 1900.
- Under his leadership, the Savannah State University Library received the 1962 and 1964 John Cotton Dana Award.
- In 1967, he returned to Savannah State University to be honored with the Savannah State University Award.
- In 1980, he received the American Library Association's most coveted award, the Joseph W. Lippincott Award. The citation of the award read in part:

His fervent advocacy was a major factor in eradicating racial discrimination from many library facilities and services, and from a number of professional associations. As founder of the Black Caucus in ALA, and as its leader throughout the group's formative years, he gave a new strength, unity, purpose and hope to many minority members of our profession.

- He has received a number of awards from the NAACP. In 1965, he received the NAACP National Office Award for Work with Youth. In 1966, he received the Georgia NAACP Conference Award. In 1983 and in 1986, he was honored by an award from the Albany Board of the NAACP.
- On May 1, 1981, he received the first annual Award for Distinguished Service in Librarianship from the School of Library and Information Science, State University of New York at Albany.
- On November 10, 1982, he received the Library Association of the City University of New York Award for his outstanding contribution to American Librarianship and for his support of Libraries and Librarians of the City University of New York.
- In 1984, he received the following awards: Martin Luther King Jr. Award for Distinguished Community Leadership, SUNY, Albany; District of Columbia Association of School Librarians Award for Contributions to Librarianship; Award from the New Jersey Black Librarians Network; African Library Award from the Kenya Library Association; Award for Contribution to International Librarianship from the Afro-Caribbean Library Association, England, and in 1985 Honorary Membership in the Virgin Islands Library Association was bestowed upon him.
- In 1985, for his contribution to the Profession and his leadership as ALA President, a Capital Tribute was presented in Washington, D.C., by Congressman Major Owens and the Congressional Black Caucus Brain Trust; New York State Legislative Resolution; Ohio House of Representatives Resolution; and a U.S. Congressional Resolution.
- In 1986 he received the New York Library Association Award for significant contributions to special populations in New York State.
- In 1991, the American Library Association bestowed upon him the American Library Association Equality Award
- In 1996, the American Library Association honored him at its 50th anniversary of the ALA Washington Office for his contribution to the Legislative Program. The Pennsylvania Library Association honored him with its Distinguished Service Award.
- In 1998, Forest Press and OCLC bestowed upon him the John Ames Humphrey Award, "in recognition of significant contributions to international librarianship."
- In 2002, the American Library Association bestowed upon him its highest award, American Library Association Honorary Membership.

== Scholarships and honors ==
The Black Caucus of the American Library Association established its first independent scholarship fund in his honor. The E. J. Josey Scholarship Award is given annually to African-American citizen of the United States or Canada pursuing a degree in an ALA accredited Library and Information Science program in the U.S. or Canada.

Upon his retirement from the University of Pittsburgh's School of Information Science in 1995, he was named Professor Emeritus and a scholarship was named in his behalf: E. J. Josey Endowment Scholarship for Minorities. This scholarship is awarded annually to an enrolled African-American graduate student in the Department of Library & Information Science who demonstrates potential for academic excellence and leadership in the profession.

The Association of College and Research Libraries named the Dr. E. J. Josey Mentoring Program for Spectrum Scholars in his honor.

== Publications ==
The author of more than 400 articles in library, educational, and history journals, Josey also authored or edited thirteen books in the fields of education, history, and library science, which include:

- The Black Librarian in America, Scarecrow Press, 1970. ISBN 0810803623 (This was the first book published that dealt exclusively with issues related to Black librarians in the United States.)
- What Black Librarians are Saying, Scarecrow Press, 1972. ISBN 0810805308
- New Dimensions for Academic Library Service, Scarecrow Press, 1975. ISBN 0810807866
- A Century of Service: Librarianship in the United States and Canada, co-editor with Sidney Jackson and Elinor Herling, ALA, 1976. ISBN 0838902200
- Opportunities for Minorities in Librarianship, co-editor with Kenneth Peeples, Jr., Scarecrow Press, 1977. ISBN 0810810220
- Handbook of Black Librarianship, co-editor with Ann Allen Shockley, Fisk University Library, Libraries Unlimited, 1977. ISBN 0872871797
- The Information Society: Issues and Answers, Oryx Press, 1978. ISBN 0912700165
- Libraries in the Political Process, Oryx Press, 1980. ISBN 0912700254
- Ethnic Collections in Libraries, with Marva L. DeLoach, Neal-Schuman Press, 1983. ISBN 0918212634
- Libraries, Coalitions and the Public Good, Neal-Schuman Press, 1987. ISBN 1555700179
- Politics and the Support of Libraries with Dr. Kenneth Shearer, November, 1990. ISBN 155570073X
- The Black Librarian in America Revisited, Scarecrow Press in January 1994. ISBN 0810828308
- Handbook of Black Librarianship. 2nd edn. E. J. Josey and Marva L. DeLoach, eds. Lanham, Md., Scarecrow Press, 2000 (see item 6). ISBN 081083720X

Josey served as Editor of:

- the Delaware Library Association Bulletin during his tenure at Delaware State College, 1955–1959.
- The Bookmark from 1976 to 1986. In the fall of 1986 he relinquished the editorship of The Bookmark and served as its co-editor for the next five years.

Notable articles and book chapters with historical acclaim include:

- "The Absent Professors." January 15, 1962. Library Journal, 87(181).
- "The Role of the College Library Staff in the Instruction in the Use of the Library", College and Research Libraries, 1962
- "The Future of the Black College Library" Library Journal 94(16) (September 1969): 3019–22.
- "The Civil Rights Movement and American Librarianship: The Opening Round" in Activism in American Libraries 1962–1973, 1987

== Honors and degrees ==
- Josey held earned degrees from Howard University, Columbia University, and the State University of New York at Albany.
- In 1973, Shaw University conferred on him an honorary Doctor of Humane Letters degree. The University of Wisconsin–Milwaukee conferred the Doctor of Public Services (D.P.L.) Honoris Causa on May 16, 1987, North Carolina Central University honored him with the Doctor of Humanities, Honoris Causa on September 29, 1989, and Clark Atlanta University bestowed upon him the Doctor of Letters Degree (D.Litt.) on May 22, 1995. Clarion University of Pennsylvania honored him with the Doctor of Humane Letters on December 15, 2001.
- In September 1992, a festschrift, E. J. Josey: An Activist Librarian, Scarecrow Press, edited by Ismail Abdullahi, was published in his honor.
- In 1999, Josey was honored for his contribution to intellectual freedom at the ALA Midwinter Meeting on the occasion of the celebration of the thirtieth anniversary of the Office of Intellectual Freedom.
- After Josey died in 2009, the E. J. Josey Foundation for Justice and Peace was established as a 501(c)(3) tax-exempt organization in Washington, North Carolina.

== See also ==
- American Library Association
- Civil rights

== Bibliography ==
- E. J. Josey : an activist librarian / ed. by Ismail Abdullahi. Metuchen, NJ. [etc.] : Scarecrow Press, 1992. ISBN 0-8108-2584-8
- Chancellor, Renate L. (2020). E. J. Josey: Transformational Leader of the Modern Library Profession. Lanham, MD: Rowman & Littlefield. ISBN 9781538121764.
- Goedeken, Edward A. (1998). "Civil Rights, Libraries, & African-American Librarianship: A Bibliographic Essay". In John Mark Tucker (ed.). Untold Stories: Civil Rights, Libraries and Black Librarianship. Champaign, IL: University of Illinois. pp. 188–199. ISBN 0-87845-104-8.

Non-profit organization positions
Preceded by Brooke E. Sheldon	President of the American Library Association; 1984–1985	Succeeded by Beverly P. Lynch
