= West of Rehoboth =

2001 novel by Alexs D. Pate

- Hardcover edition
- Author: Alexs D. Pate
- Language: English
- Genre: Bildungsroman, Historical fiction, Mystery
- Publisher: William Morrow, Harper Perennial
- Publication date: 2001, 2002
- Publication place: United States
- Media type: Print (hardcover and paperback)
- Pages: 256
- Awards: Fiction Honor Book
- ISBN: 0-380-80042-X

West of Rehoboth is a novel by Alexs D. Pate, first published in 2001 as a hardcover by William Morrow and later republished in 2002 as a paperback by Harper Perennial. The story takes place in summer 1962, in the midst of the Jim Crow era of the United States; it follows a twelve-year-old African American boy named Edward Massey, who attempts to understand his "Uncle" Rufus, a scorned and bitter man. In 2002, the Black Caucus of the American Library Association, Inc. (BCALA) noted West of Rehoboth as one of three Fiction Honor Books.

== Plot summary ==
Edward "Eddie" Massey is a twelve-year-old living in a predominantly black neighborhood of Northern Philadelphia in the 1960s. At a large Fourth of July picnic, he reads Hercule Poirot detective novels instead of playing. Gang violence disrupts the event, and gang leader MommaButch bombs his family's home. Eddie's father drives them to Rehoboth Beach, Delaware for summer vacation. There, Eddie, his sister, and his mother stay with Eddie's Aunt Edna Hull, an influential figure in the segregated black section of town. Edna's house doubles as an entertainment center with a restaurant and dance floor; her only rival is the Do Drop Inn, which permits gambling and drinking.

While Eddie's mother waits tables in town, Eddie becomes fascinated by his "Uncle" Rufus Brown, who once killed Eddie's pet turtle. A local boy tells him that Rufus is an alcoholic who once killed someone, and that he can make himself "disappear." Eddie delivers laundry to Rufus, who knocks him down but also reveals a more vulnerable side when discussing love. From his mother, Eddie learns that Rufus killed a man named T Hall, though she refuses to explain the details. When Rufus reappears, he shares with Eddie his passion for Edna, and describes losing a fight in her defense; the memory makes him break down crying. Eddie's mother forbids any further contact between them, but Eddie sneaks out and finds him by the forest. Rufus is talking, but not to anyone Eddie can see. Rufus claims it was with a teacher of sorts that makes him live his life backwards. He invites Eddie on a trip to the junkyard. They drive recklessly and crash into a ravine. Desperate to save Eddie, Rufus brings Eddie with him into his memories and way of living life backwards, initiating a series of flashbacks.

A thirteen-year-old Edna tends to her father, who has had several strokes and lost much bodily function. With difficulty, he whispers "happy" to her before dying, which she mentally agonizes over. At nineteen, Edna moves to Philadelphia, excited by her cousin's stories of city life and flirtatious adventures. Her first romance, with a musician, turns sour when he attempts to rape her. She enters a relationship of convenience with a Pullman porter, who brings her to West Rehoboth. Meanwhile, Rufus lost his mother when he was ten, and turned to troublemaking to feed a desire for power and attention. He gains the nickname "Blackjack" for his homemade weapon. At twelve, he attempts a robbery, but is caught and beaten by a white crowd, crushing his self-esteem. Edna and Rufus meet in Rehoboth in the 1940s, and the two fall in love. Before long, Rufus loses his job, takes to drinking, and begins proposing to Edna every day unsuccessfully. After a year, Edna's mother dies, and she uses her inheritance to build her restaurant. Their romance cools. T Hall, a fellow drunk at the Do Drop Inn, initiates a fight with Rufus and insults Edna; Rufus stabs him, and flees Edna's attempt to cover for him. He rejoins the Merchant Marines and saves up money to try to make things right again with Edna. He confides in a new friend, Otis Jessup, but Otis robs and blackmails Rufus, who spirals out of control. After five years, he returns to Rehoboth, where he spends all his remaining money on alcohol at the Do Drop Inn. Edna refuses him entry into her home, but allows him to live in a shack on her property, where he resolves to "serve his time."

In the present, Rufus claims his innocence to Eddie despite his past. He claims that all colored men are seen as guilty from birth in their world; Eddie firmly disagrees. Soon, the police arrive. To protect Rufus, Eddie claims that the accident was his own fault and introduces Rufus as a mute and deaf veteran named Otis Jessup. Edna appears, and Rufus apologizes for everything, but she says it is too late for them and that he needs to become a different man. As an ambulance takes them away, Eddie lies satisfied in his bond with Rufus, excited to share Rufus's story with his friends and potentially the world.

== Chronology ==
- 1900: Edna is born to Lula and Spencer Grand.
- 1908: Edna is baptized at age eight, solidifying her belief in Christianity.
- When Rufus was ten: Rufus's mother, Louise, dies of Tuberculosis.
- When Rufus was eleven: Rufus earns the nickname “Blackjack.”
- A Saturday when Rufus was twelve: Rufus tries to rob a little white boy, but he is beaten and humiliated.
- 1913: Spencer dies from stroke-related complications, uttering “happy” on his deathbed to Edna.
- 1917: Edna meets her cousin Felicia, who encourages her to move to Philadelphia.
- Late 1919-Mid 1920: Edna moves to Philadelphia.
- Early 1920-Late 1920: Edna's first lover, Richard, attempts to rape her, resulting in their breakup.
- Late 1920-Mid 1921: Edna is introduced to West Rehoboth by a Pullman porter. She leaves Philadelphia and moves there.
- 1947-1949: Edna meets Rufus at the Supper Bell Inn and they hit it off. Rufus proposes every night, but she sidesteps each time. They comfortably remain a couple.
- 1949 or 1950: Edward, or “Eddie,” is born to Angela and Earl Massey.
- 1950: Edna's mother, Lula, dies. Edna uses her inheritance money to build a large home that doubles as a restaurant, earning her huge influence in West Rehoboth.
- A Saturday in 1952: Rufus kills T Hall in a fit of mania and flees the police, leaving Edna behind and ending up in Norfolk, Virginia.
- 1952-1955: Rufus rejoins the Merchant Marines and manages to save up almost $2000.
- 1954: Rufus's case is closed, leading Edna to believe he has died. She begins caring for one of her young cousins, Christine.
- 1955: Otis Jessup, Rufus's shipmate, steals over $1500 from him and blackmails him into silence. Rufus spirals, losing the rest of his money and his job.
- A Wednesday in 1957: Rufus returns to West Rehoboth, arriving at Edna's place drunk and empty-handed. She bans him from entering her home. Rufus moves into her adjacent shack.
- Summer 1961: Rufus kills and cooks Eddie's pet turtle, Mr. Peabody.
- July 4, 1962: An Independence Day picnic in Northern Philadelphia is interrupted by gang violence. The Masseys’ and Styokos’ houses are bombed by gang leader MommaButch.
- July 6, 1962: The Masseys leave on their annual trip to Rehoboth Beach, Delaware.
- July 7, 1962: Earl Massey returns home to Philadelphia.
- July 19, 1962 or July 26, 1962: Eddie learns about Rufus's drunkenness and “disappearances.”
- The following Saturday (Two days later): Eddie meets Rufus for the first time while on an errand for Edna.
- The following Sunday (One day later): The Masseys go to the beach. Eddie learns that Rufus had killed a man named T Hall.
- The following Tuesday (Two days later): Eddie meets Rufus a second time.
- The following Wednesday (One day later): Eddie is banned from seeing Rufus, but he sneaks out and they drive to the junkyard, crashing on the way there. They enter Rufus's past. An ambulance arrives at the crash. Rufus apologizes to Edna.

== Reception ==
Sanford Pinkser of The Washington Post credited Pate for his effective exploration of love, racism, and capturing the charm of "the vitality that an all-black atmosphere can provide". Publishers Weekly stated that Pate's characters in West of Rehoboth were "fully imagined, breaking from stereotype," and that the setting was skillfully depicted. However, they added that the story's prose and structure could tend to feel garbled or disjointed. Kirkus Reviews described West of Rehoboth as "profoundly affecting" and credited Pate for vividly depicting "the way endemic, inescapable racism suffocates and ruins". In 2002, the novel was credited as one of three Fiction Honor Books by the Black Caucus of the American Library Association, Inc. (BCALA).
