= Wanda Kay Brown =

American librarian

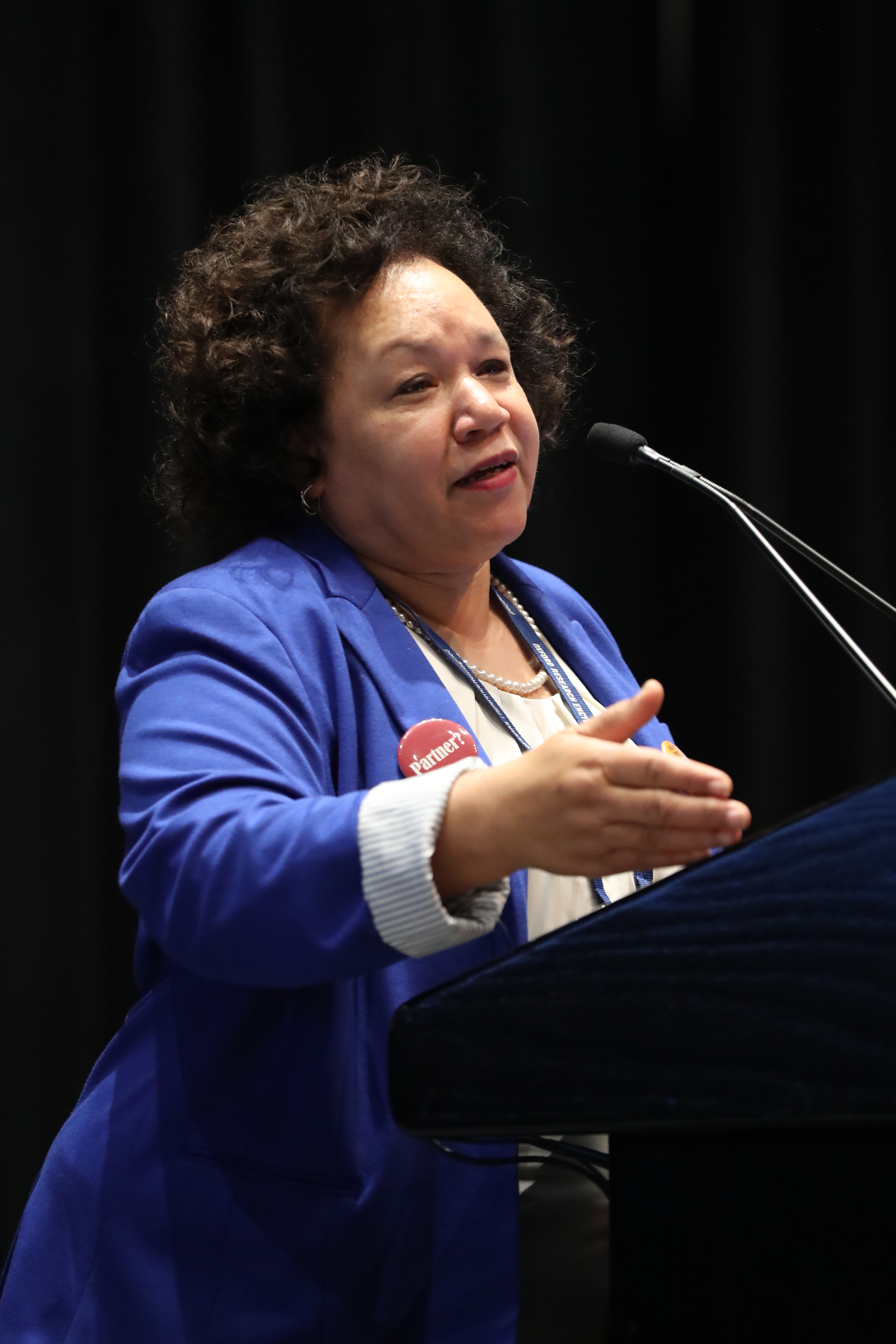

President of the American Library Association
- In office 2019–2020
- Preceded by: Loida Garcia-Febo
- Succeeded by: Julius C. Jefferson Jr.

Personal details
- Education: Winston-Salem State University; University of North Carolina at Greensboro
- Occupation: Librarian

Wanda Kay Brown is an American librarian, who was the president of the American Library Association for the 2019–2020 term. She is the director of the C. G. O'Kelly Library at Winston-Salem State University and a leader in state and national library associations. She is the first American Library Association president who is a library director at one of the nation's historically black colleges and universities. She is twice president of the Black Caucus of the American Library Association in 2006–2008 and 2024–2026.

== Background and education ==
Brown, a native North Carolinian, received a Bachelor of Arts in English at Winston-Salem State University in May 1977 and a master's degree in Library Science at the University of North Carolina at Greensboro in 1983. Her personal story as a chosen child and an example of a rise from adversity aired on WXII-12-Winston-Salem.

== Career ==
Brown began working at Wake Forest University in 1977 as a library technician, eventually working her way up to associate director of the Z. Smith Reynolds Library in 2007. Since 2016, she has served as Director of Library Services for the C. G. O'Kelly Library at Winston-Salem State University.

Brown has been a member of the American Library Association for more than 30 years. She has held multiple positions within the Black Caucus of the American Library Association (BCALA), including time spent as treasurer (1992–1996, 2016–2018), executive board member (2001–2003, 2014–2016), and president (2006–2008). From 2011 to 2013 she was the president of the North Carolina Library Association, with which she has also held the positions of treasurer (1991–1998) and chair of the finance committee (2005–2009).

== American Library Association Presidency ==
=== Campaign ===
In early 2018, Brown received endorsement from Black Caucus of the American Library Association, supported by a petition signed by 34 members in support of her running. Brown was elected president of the American Library Association for 2019–2020. Brown received 6,066 votes; her opponent, Peter Hepburn, head librarian at the College of the Canyons, Santa Clarita, CA, received 4,066 Votes. The 11,037 ballots cast, representing approximately 22.1 percent of ALA membership, were up from the previous year's total of 9,748. Brown is the first librarian from a historically black college or university to serve as ALA president.

=== Presidential statements and publications ===
As President of the American Library Association Brown wrote a column for its magazine, American Libraries, and addressed the role of librarians promoting Association values, the redesign of libraries. and how libraries can help immigrants and refugees thrive with inclusive programs and services.

In 2020, Brown wrote "Forward Together: Charting a Path to a More Vibrant and Effective Organization", and presented recommendations to enable sustainable, long-term change for the American Library Association. On February 14, 2020, Brown and the Executive Board issued a statement regarding the Association's financial shortfall in the operating budget.

On January 15, 2020, Brown announced the appointment of Tracie D. Hall as Executive Director of the American Library Association.

The role of librarians' intersection with the 2020 census was the topic of President Brown's March/April American Libraries column. She noted, "It's important to view this civic duty through the lens of social justice. Hard-to-count groups include recent immigrants, people of color, young children, and renters."

Libraries' response to the COVID-19 pandemic was the topic of Wanda Kay Brown's presidential column in May, 2020, "Libraries Adapt amid Crisis: Finding inspiration from library workers across the country." She highlighted homework help at the Charleston County Public Library in South Carolina, the My Librarian 30-minute appointments to assist patrons with navigating small business loans at the Public Library of Cincinnati and Hamilton County in Ohio, and the housing of homeless people at the Spokane Public Library in Washington. Brown concluded, "May these challenging and uncertain times find us working even closer together so that our libraries, our communities, our association, and our families will all thrive. "

In her final American Libraries essay as American Library Association president in June, 2020 President Brown reviewed her 2019-2020 year as one of change, loss, and hope.

On June 1, 2020 Wanda Kay Brown announced the endorsement the Black Caucus of the American Library Association, "Statement Condemning Increased Violence and Racism Towards Black Americans and People of Color" by the American Library Association Executive Board.

=== #eBooksForAll ===
Under Brown's leadership the American Library Association launched the campaign #eBooksForAll denouncing Macmillan Publishers' planned embargo on eBook sales to libraries. The background on Macmillan's decision has been explained by Jessamyn West in a CNN opinion essay, "Libraries are fighting to preserve your right to borrow e-books".

=== 2020 Annual Conference and COVID-19 ===
Wanda Kay Brown was the first president in 75 years under whom the live Annual Conference, scheduled for Chicago in June 2020, was cancelled. The reason was the Coronavirus disease 2019 (COVID-19). "ALA's priority is the health and safety of the library community, including our members, staff, supporters, vendors and volunteers," Brown stated in a press release. "As the COVID-19 pandemic unfolds, it's become clear that in the face of an unprecedented situation, we need to make tough choices." The 2020 conference was reconfigured as a virtual event, Community Through Connection, on June 24–25, 2020. The opening session featured Misty Copeland and closing session featured Natalie Portman.

In an interview with Information Today Brown's presidency was characterized as "bound to be remembered as one of the most tumultuous in the 144-year history of ALA."

== Black Caucus of the American Library Association ==
Wanda Kay Brown was elected president of the Black Caucus of the American Library Association (BCALA) for 2024–2026. She had previously served as treasurer (1992–1996, 2016–2018), executive board member (2001–2003, 2014–2016), and president (2006–2008).

== Selected publications ==
- "Find Your Place within ALA: Together Let’s Promote the Value of Libraries and the Association".
- "Inclusive by Design: Reevaluating Physical and Virtual Spaces to Address Inequity".
- "Welcoming New Americans: Helping Immigrants and Refugees Thrive with Inclusive Programs and Services".
- "Forward Together: Charting a Path to a More Vibrant and Effective Organization".
- "Don't Be Counted Out: Libraries, ALA Mobilize for the 2020 Census".
- "Libraries Adapt amid Crisis: Finding Inspiration in Library Workers across the Country".
- "A Year of Change, Loss, Hope: Bidding Many Farewells as I Close My Presidential Term".
- Sylvia Sprinkle-Hamlin. American Library Association, ALAIR.

== Awards ==
- 2015. BCALA DEMCO/ALA Black Caucus Award for Excellence
- 2013. University of North Carolina at Greensboro School of Education Outstanding Alumni Achievement Award.
- 2013. BCALA Leadership Award
- 2012. BCALA Distinguished Service Award.
- 2009. University of North Carolina at Greensboro. UNCG Kovacs Award for Outstanding Alumni Achievement
