= A. P. Marshall =

African American librarian, educator, and historian

- Born: September 5, 1914; Texarkana, Texas, United States
- Died: March 9, 2001 (aged 86)
- Education: Lincoln University; University of Illinois at Urbana–Champaign
- Occupations: Librarian, educator

Albert Prince Marshall (September 5, 1914 – March 9, 2001) was an American librarian and educator. He was the director of multiple academic libraries, including the libraries of Lincoln University and Eastern Michigan University. Marshall was an active participant in the civil rights movement, serving in a leadership role in a Missouri chapter of the NAACP. He worked to fight discrimination against African-Americans in librarianship and held several leadership roles in the profession, including as vice president of the American Library Association. Later in his life Marshall focused on documenting the history of Ypsilanti, Michigan's black community members, earning him the nickname "Mr. Ypsilanti".

== Early life and education ==
Albert Prince Marshall was born September 5, 1914, in Texarkana, Texas. Marshall's father was a carpenter and railroad worker who died when A. P. was young, and his family moved to Kansas City, Missouri.

He received a bachelor's degree from Lincoln University in 1938, and went on to earn a second bachelor's degree in library science from the University of Illinois at Urbana–Champaign in 1939. In 1950 he earned a master's degree in intellectual history, and in 1953 he earned another master's degree in history from the University of Illinois.

== Career as librarian ==
Marshall created A Guide to Negro Periodical Literature by using three-by-five index cards to index scholarly and popular publications, as well as serial publications from fraternal organizations, professional societies, and colleges and universities. He began working on the project while working as a library assistant at Lincoln University in 1939, and it was published in four volumes from 1941 through 1946, pausing during the year and a half he served in the U.S. Coast Guard during World War II. The guide gives a "unique snapshot of African American culture and politics before World War II" and is now known as The Marshall Index.

Marshall took a job at Winston-Salem Teacher's College, working as the director of the school's library from 1941 to 1948. In 1950 he returned to his alma mater, Lincoln University, to serve as the director of libraries. While at Lincoln, Marshall worked to increase the size of the library's collection (nearly tripling in size in less than two decades) and to providing more training opportunities for the library's staff. In 1966 he wrote a book about the university's history, Soldiers' Dream: A Centennial History of Lincoln University in Missouri.

In 1969 Marshall moved to Ypsilanti, Michigan to take a job as director of libraries at Eastern Michigan University. He went on to serve as EMU's dean of academic services from 1972 to 1978, and taught as a professor until his retirement in 1980.

== Service to librarianship ==
Marshall helped found the North Carolina Negro Library Association, the first black library association in the United States, and served as its vice president. He served as the first African-American president of the Missouri Library Association in the early 1960s, as well as serving as the editor of the association's journal.

Marshall was an active participant in librarianship through the American Library Association, working to fight discrimination and segregation within the organization. At the first ALA conference he attended in 1940 in Cincinnati, the handful of black attendees were not allowed to stay in the conference hotel or attend meal events; Marshall was asked to use the freight elevator but rode the passenger elevator even after being accosted by another attendee. He served as an councilor on the ALA Council from 1963 to 1976, and in 1965 became the first African-American to serve as chair of the Nominating Committee for ALA president. In 1970 was nominated to serve as the organization's president but lost the election by a slim margin.

He also served as one of the eight appointed members of the U.S. Office of Education's National Advisory Council on Library Resources.

== NAACP leadership ==
In the early 1950s Marshall served as the president of the Jefferson City, Missouri NAACP branch and was the vice president while that branch brought a lawsuit against the Jefferson City school board for forcing black junior high school students to attend the elementary school.

== Work as historian ==
After his retirement from Eastern Michigan University in 1980, Marshall devoted his energy to historical research, especially the black history of Ypsilanti. The Ypsilanti Library describes his work as "pioneering," saying his research "helped transform Ypsilanti's sense of itself"; Marshall was referred to as "Mr. Ypsilanti" and "the caretaker of black history for the city". Marshall wrote about Ypsilanti engineer and inventor Elijah McCoy in his 1989 book The "real McCoy" of Ypsilanti. Marshall's other books included:

- Unconquered Souls: The History of the African American in Ypsilanti (1993)
- Helen Walker McAndrew, Ypsilanti's Lady Frontier Doctor (1996), and
- The Legendary 4 Horsemen of the African Methodist Episcopal Church (1996).

He also wrote a regular column in the Ypsilanti Courier.

== Personal life ==
Marshall married Ruthe Langley in 1941. They had one daughter, Satia Marshall Orange, who went on to become director of the American Library Association Office for Literacy and Outreach Services.

== Legacy ==
Marshall died March 9, 2001. Throughout his career, Marshall worked to preserve the histories of the African-American experience, beginning with indexing black periodicals and culminating in folk histories and interviews sharing the lives of black people who lived through tumultuous times. The interviews he recorded in the 1980s now make up the A.P. Marshall African American Oral History Archive.

He received a wide variety of awards and recognition in his lifetime, including:

- Distinguished Service to Librarianship award from the Black Caucus of the American Library Association (1978)
- Dr. Martin Luther King Jr. Award from the Ann Arbor Public Schools (1985)
- Distinguished Career Citation from the Association of College and Research Libraries (1989)

In 2018, Marshall was listed as one of the four most prominent librarians who stood to oppose racial segregation in the library profession in an ALA Council "Resolution to Honor Those Who Fought Segregation".
