= Julius C. Jefferson Jr. =

American librarian

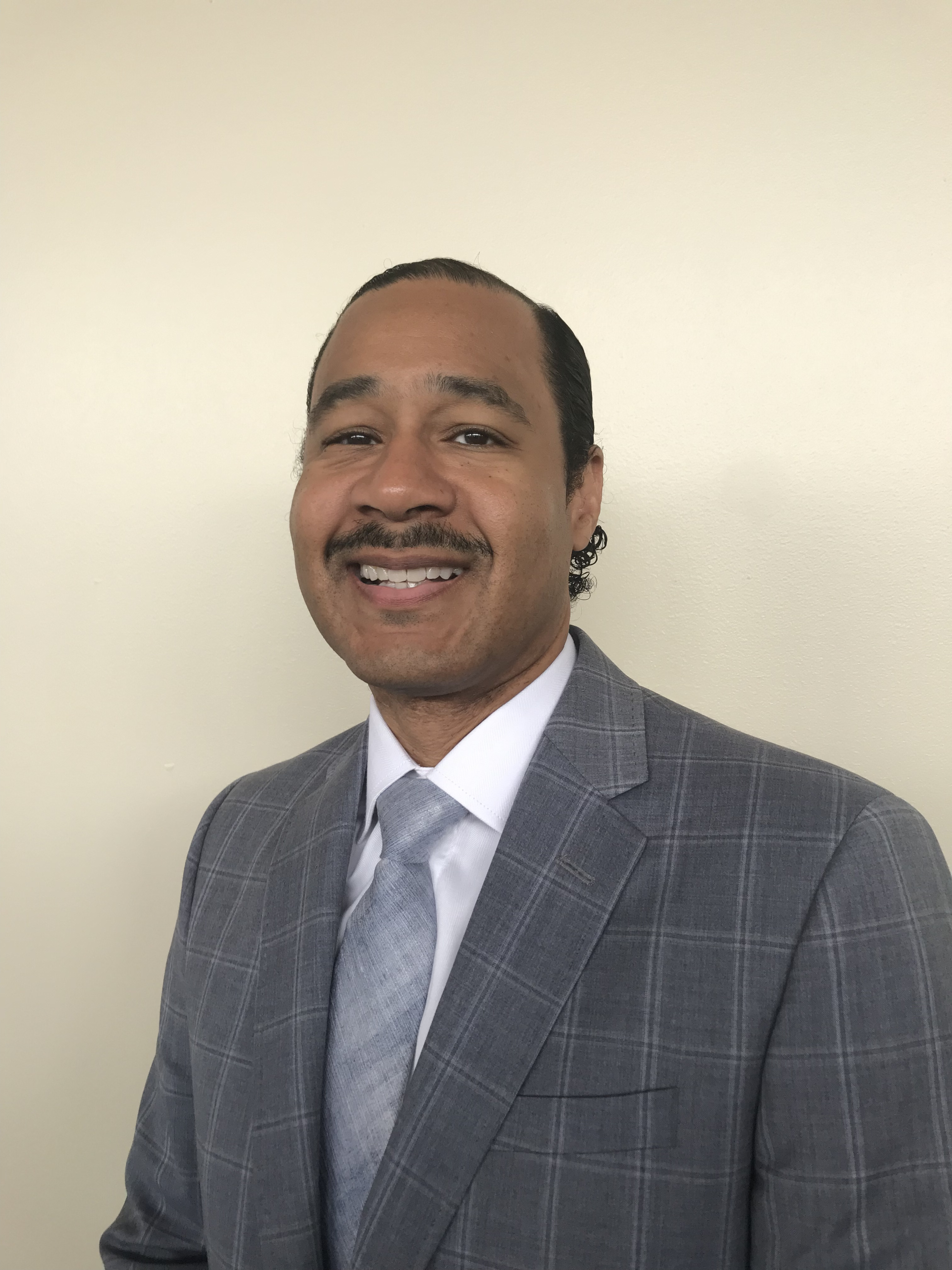

President of the American Library Association
- In office 2020–2021
- Preceded by: Wanda Kay Brown
- Succeeded by: Patty Wong

President of the Freedom to Read Foundation
- In office 2013–2016
- Preceded by: Candace D. Morgan
- Succeeded by: Martin Garnar

Personal details
- Born: July 22, 1968 (age 57) United States
- Education: Howard University, University of Maryland
- Occupation: Librarian

Julius C. Jefferson Jr. (born July 22, 1968) is an American librarian who was president of the American Library Association for the 2020–2021 term. In 2022 President Joe Biden appointed him to the National Museum and Library Services Board which advises the agency on general policies with respect to the duties, powers, and authority of the Institute of Museum and Library Services relating to museum, library, and information services, as well as the annual selection of the recipients of the National Medal for Museum and Library Service. Jefferson is additionally a section head of the Congressional Research Service at the Library of Congress, and served as the president of the Freedom to Read Foundation from 2013 to 2016.

Jefferson was born in Washington, D.C. as the 4th generation in a family. His father worked as an archivist at the National Archives and Records Administration, and his mother was a technical specialist at the ALA. He originally dreamed of being a drummer for Earth, Wind & Fire, but credits his inspiration of working in libraries to Arturo Alfonso Schomburg, and claimed to become a bibliophile.

Jefferson received a B.A. in history from Howard University and an MLS from the University of Maryland.

He has served on the executive board of the Black Caucus of the American Library Association (2007–2009) and is a member. He served as president of the Freedom to Read Foundation and president of the District of Columbia Library Association.

== American Library Association ==
Jefferson was the first American Library Association president whose presidency was virtual due to COVID-19. During his presidency as part of his broader work to build relationships and strengthen connections Jefferson established "Holding Space: A national conversation series with libraries" – a nationwide virtual tour to highlight the innovation and impact of a diverse range of libraries and engage stakeholders to advocate for libraries and the communities they serve.

Prior to his election as president Jefferson held many positions within the Association. He has served on the executive board and council. As chair of the Intellectual Freedom Committee of the American Library Association Jefferson initiated Intellectual Freedom Summer School.

== International Federation of Library Associations ==
Jefferson is Chair of the International Federation of Library Associations (IFLA) North America Regional Division. In this capacity he advocates and identifies priorities for the region and defines and delivers action plans that respond to these.The IFLA North America Regional Division covers Canada and the United States of America.

== Awards and Honors ==
In 2023 Jefferson received the Joseph W. Lippincott Award for his lifelong mentoring of librarians and library workers; commitment to equity, diversity and inclusion (EDI); and for leadership in the profession in a variety of roles, most notably during the pandemic.

In 2022 he was lecturer at the Elizabeth W. Stone Lecture series speaking on “The First Amendment, Race and the Truth."

In 2021 Jefferson was honored with the Distinguished Terrapin Award by the University of Maryland iSchool for excelling in his field of expertise and providing value to the communities in which he serves.

Jefferson received the Ainsworth Rand Spofford President's Award from the District of Columbia Library Association in 2019.

In 2019 Jeferson was honored with the American Library Association Equality Award for his commitment to diversity and inclusion with a focus on the rights of underrepresented library workers.

He has been honored with the BCALA Outstanding Contribution to Publishing Award (2013) and the BCALA Appreciation Award.(2010)

== Publications ==
Jefferson is co-editor of the 2012 volume, The 21st-Century Black Librarian in America: Issues and Challenges, and has worked to get more Black men into the library profession.
