= Mollie Huston Lee =

American librarian

- Lee in 1968
- Born: January 18, 1907; Columbus, Ohio, US
- Died: January 26, 1982 (aged 75); Durham, North Carolina, US
- Education: Howard University, Columbia University
- Occupation: Librarian
- Employer: Richard B. Harrison Public Library
- Spouse: Dr. James S. Lee

Mollie Huston Lee (January 18, 1907 – January 26, 1982) was the first African American librarian in Raleigh, North Carolina, and the founder of Raleigh's Richard B. Harrison Public Library, the first library in Raleigh to serve African Americans. Her greatest achievement was developing, maintaining, and increasing public library service to the African American people of Raleigh and Wake County, while striving to achieve equal library service for the entire community. She retired June 1972 after over 42 years in librarianship.

== Personal life and early career ==
Born as Mollie Huston, Lee was born in Columbus, Ohio, on January 18, 1907, to Corrina Smith Huston and Rolla Solomon Huston, a private business owner and politician. As the only child of "learned parents," there were always books around the family home and growing up, Lee developed an interest in public affairs. She married her husband, Dr. James S. Lee, Biology chairman at North Carolina Central University, in 1935 and had one son, James S. Lee Jr.

While attending Howard University, Lee worked as a student library assistant under the direction of Edward Christopher Williams, the first African-American to receive a library degree in the United States. Lee acknowledged Williams as the inspiration for her future efforts as a pioneering librarian.

After earning an A.B. from Howard University, Lee became the first African-American to receive a scholarship to attend the Columbia University School of Library Service. Upon earning a Bachelor of Library Science from Columbia, Lee returned to North Carolina in 1930 and began working as a librarian at Shaw University. During her five-year employment at the Shaw University Library, Lee recognized the need among Black people in the surrounding community for a special African-American literature collection. She recognized that this need could be met through the services of a public library.

== Librarian of the Richard B. Harrison Library ==
Despite making up a third of Wake County's population, African Americans did not have a library they could legally patronize before 1935. Mollie Huston Lee is credited as the founder and "literal builder" of Raleigh's first public library for African Americans. Lee organized a group of community members consisting of, among local leadership, representatives of the North Carolina Library Commission and North Carolina Department of Public Instruction. Together, they met with Raleigh's mayor, George A. Iseley, at Christ Church in 1935 to discuss the need for an additional public library. The meeting ultimately resulted in the formation of a biracial library committee, the first in the American South.

For the new library, city commissioners appropriated $2,500, while county commissioners appropriated $750. Local fundraising, using the slogan, "A dollar and a book," provided an additional $466.86. Altogether, the Richard B. Harrison Public Library opened on November 12, 1935 with Lee serving as librarian. It was named after Richard Berry Harrison, a renowned Black Broadway performer and lecturer at A&T College.

Lee valued community outreach and frequently brought the library to patrons when they were unable to visit the library themselves. Her actions encouraged community members to use the library and its resources. Despite trying economic conditions, the library's resources continued to expand due to Lee's efforts.

Lee also assisted in the training of future librarians. Library science students from Atlanta University, North Carolina Central University, and the University of North Carolina at Chapel Hill learned from firsthand experiences at the Richard B. Harrison Library under the direction of Mollie Huston Lee. She served as the supervisor of Negro School Libraries in North Carolina from 1946 to 1953. Lee was known as a "librarian's librarian."

Reflecting on her career as a librarian, Lee expressed, "I don't know of anything else that can help anyone grow more than working in a library." Mollie Huston Lee told a radio audience in 1951, "a public library is the recorded memory of mankind, serving the community. Its function is to make available to all, information and thought in all fields of human knowledge and experience and to help each person, whatever his interest may be, to find and use the books and other library facilities and material which best serve his needs."

During her 37-year career at the Harrison Library, she saw the library evolve from a tiny, one-room storefront library on Hargett Street to a $300,000 structure on New Bern Avenue. She retired from a 42-year library career on June 30, 1972, to "have fun and do some of the things [she had] not had time for."

== Mollie Huston Lee Collection of Black Literature ==
Lee's dedication to the African American populations from Raleigh, Wake County, to the whole of North Carolina are best evident in the extensive collection of books and other resources by and about African Americans she established. In an interview, Lee stated, "I felt there was a need to emphasize black books. Black collections were not popular then like they are today. I felt more people should know about black history, black authors, and the contributions of black people."

Commonly, publications about African Americans were only in print for two years. As a result, Lee attentively monitored publishers and vendors of African American books. She would even visit the University Place Book Shop in New York City to select and purchase rare items for the collection.

This collection of over 5,000 volumes ranging from adult and children's fiction and nonfiction, serials, pamphlets, and vertical file materials grew gradually but slowly during the thirty-eight years Lee served as librarian at the Richard B. Harrison Library. An annual appropriate from the State Library of North Carolina over the period of twelve years provided the greatest financial assistance for the collection. The collection would become accessible to the public libraries of North Carolina through the State Library's interlibrary loan, lending it additional value and recognition.

In 1972 the "Negro Collection" was renamed the Mollie Huston Lee Collection of Black Literature.

== Emphasis on community outreach and programming ==
Mollie Huston Lee viewed the civic education of community members as essential, and she created a well-defined philosophy of community affairs that is evident throughout her career. Lee stated: "If you're a public librarian, you have to be with the people to find out their wants and needs and supply them with the materials to give them the insight to a more wholesome life through reading materials. You can't just sit behind a desk and issue books." Programming at the Harrison Library included lectures featuring both Black and white speakers, children's authors, and an expanded story time. An emphasis was placed on adult education, "[teaching] them how to live better, longer, fuller and more enjoyable lives." Educational programs directed to residents of the rural Raleigh area provided instruction in the development of reading and writing skills. Discussion groups on relevant topics were also created for patrons of all ages with the idea of keeping community members informed and aware of current news issues. The Richard B. Harrison Library was well known regionally and nationally for providing services and programs for the aged, blind, disadvantaged, and illiterate.

== Membership and honors ==
Mollie Huston Lee was selected as a United Nations Educational, Scientific and Cultural Organization (UNESCO) library delegate, as well as a trustee of the State Library of North Carolina. Additionally, Lee was instrumental in the foundation of the North Carolina Negro Library Association (NCNLA) which dissolved once the American Library Association (ALA) and the North Carolina Library Association opened membership to African Americans. She was the second African American elected at-large to the ALA council, serving from 1950 to 1954, and in 1971, Lee represented ALA at the White House Conference on Aging. In 1971, Lee was the first African American woman elected "Tar Heel of the Week" as a result of her numerous professional and civic contributions to the state of North Carolina.

== Publications ==
Mollie Huston Lee's contributions to the field of library science include the following:

- Lee, Mollie Huston. 1944. Development of Negro Libraries in North Carolina. North Carolina Libraries. 3(2):4.
- Lee, Mollie Huston. 1955. North Carolina Negro Library Association, 1935-54. Library Service Review. 2(1):10-32.
