= San Francisco Arts Commission =

American local government agency

Agency overview
- Formed: 1932; 94 years ago
- Jurisdiction: City and County of San Francisco
- Headquarters: 401 Van Ness Avenue, Suite 325, San Francisco, CA 94102
- Agency executives: Ralph Remington, Director of Cultural Affairs; Roberto Ordeñana, President
- Website: sfartscommission.org

The San Francisco Arts Commission (SFAC) is the City agency that champions the arts as essential to daily life by investing in a vibrant arts community, enlivening the urban environment and shaping innovative cultural policy in San Francisco, California. The commission oversees Civic Design Review, Community Investments, Public Art, SFAC Galleries, The Civic Art Collection, and the Art Vendor Program.

== History ==
The commission was established in 1932 as "The San Francisco Art Commission". It was primarily founded to keep the musicians of the San Francisco Symphony employed during Great Depression in the United States by funding low-cost concerts. This has led to a popular run of low-cost San Francisco Pops concerts by Arthur Fiedler.

They created the Visual Arts commission in 1948. The Commission ran the San Francisco Arts Festival from 1946 to 1986. The festival was usually held in the Civic Center.

The Commission created the Neighborhood Arts Program in 1967. They were early funders for local programs like the San Francisco Blues Festival and Precita Eyes Mural Center. They later became the Community Arts and Education Program. The program expanded under Commissioner Stephen Goldstine, who tapped into the federal funding during the 1970s to fund local artists. Intern John Kreidler, who would later head the philanthropic San Francisco Foundation, suggested using federal grants from the Comprehensive Employment and Training Act, or CETA. With federal funding, the program was able to provide monthly stipends for artists such as the Pickle Family Circus. Inspired by the Works Progress Administration's employment of artists in the service to the community in the 1930s, this program was so successful that it became a model for similar programs throughout the US.

They started the San Francisco International Airport art program in 1977. As of July 2019, the San Francisco International Airport is the only airport with a program accredited by the American Association of Museums. Its public art program is provided by the commission, with pieces of varying styles and mediums and is mostly funded with a portion of the construction costs for its terminals.

A joint program between the National Endowment for the Arts and AmeriCorps brought the pilot WritersCorp program to San Francisco in 1994, where it continues to run under the commission.

The Commission removed the "Early Days" sculpture that was a part of the Pioneer Monument in Civic Center, San Francisco in 2018 and the Statue of Christopher Columbus in Pioneer Park in 2020 due to their controversial nature in relation to the country's colonial history. After protestors toppled several statues in the Golden Gate Park, including the Bust of Ulysses S. Grant and Statue of Junípero Serra, Mayor London Breed ordered the Arts Commission to evaluate which of the city's almost one hundred public memorials and monuments should be removed.

The SFAC partnered with Yerba Buena Center for the Arts, San Francisco Grants for the Arts, and the San Francisco Human Rights Commission to launch a guaranteed income program in March 2021. The pilot program would give $1,000 a month to 130 artists below certain income levels for six months, beginning in May 2021. It is paid through the Arts Impact Endowment established by Proposition E in 2018, which allocates 1.5% of the city's hotel tax to arts and cultural services. This follows similar programs in Stockton, Oakland, and Marin County to support artists during the COVID-19 pandemic in the United States.

== Administration ==
The commission is composed of fifteen commissioners, all of whom are appointed by the Mayor of San Francisco. While they operate independently from the San Francisco Board of Supervisors, the Board has authority over the commission's budget and proposals.

== Location ==
The commission was originally located at 165 Grove Street, but the building burned down in 1980 and was later demolished. It has moved its headquarters numerous times over the years, including for brief period at 25 Van Ness Avenue, and has since moved to its present location within the Veterans Building at the San Francisco War Memorial and Performing Arts Center.

=== San Francisco Arts Commission Main Gallery ===
The San Francisco Arts Commission Main Gallery, located at 401 Van Ness Avenue, is the contemporary art exhibitions program of the commission. The Gallery commissions new works, collaborates with arts and community organizations and supports artist's projects. Admission to the gallery is free and is open Wednesdays-Sundays, from 12 p.m. to 5 p.m.

The main gallery, entitled "Capricorn Asunder", was founded in 1970 by visual arts director Elio Benvenuto at 155 Grove Street. It was renamed "S.F. Art Commission Gallery" in 1981. The gallery was relocated to its current location in the War Memorial Veterans Building in 2017.

== Programs and functions ==
The Commission gave out about $4.5 million in funding in 2008, most of which came from the city's hotel tax. Their Community Arts and Education Program funds arts activities, such as programming for at-risk communities, and street festivals, such as the Filipino Parol Lantern Festival, in different neighborhoods.

The Commission oversees the city-owned cultural centers — such as the Mission Cultural Center for Latino Arts, the Bayview Opera House, and the African American Art and Culture Complex.

The WritersCorps brings poets to the city's public schools. They used to service the city's Juvenile Probation Department's Log Cabin Ranch, which closed in 2018.

=== Visual Arts Committee ===
The commission has approval authority over designs for any proposed civic structures. The Arts Enrichment Ordinance allocates two percent of those construction costs towards the acquisition of graphics, murals, and sculpture for public buildings and spaces. The Visual Arts Committee is the governing body responsible for approving new commissions of public art for San Francisco.

San Francisco has been recognized with multiple awards by the Americans for the Arts Public Arts Network, the only national award for public art, which every year recognizes the best public artworks created in the country.

==== Portrait of a Phenomenal Woman ====
The Board of Supervisors approved an ordinance requiring 30% of public artwork in the city depicting historical figures be women in October 2018, with a work honoring poet and civil rights activist Maya Angelou planned to be erected outside the San Francisco Public Library's main branch by the end of 2020. The commission began looking for proposals in November 2018 with a budget of $180,000. Out of the hundreds of applications, the Public Art Selection Panel of the Visual Arts Committee selected three—Kenyatta Hinkle, Lava Thomas, and Jules Arthur—as the finalists and called for public comments on their proposals in July 2019. The panel recommended Thomas' Portrait of a Phenomenal Woman with Arthur's The Gift of Literature as the alternative to the Visual Arts Committee, however the committee tabled both proposals in August.

In October 2019, Supervisor Catherine Stefani, one of the project sponsors, called for the commission to restart the selection process with clearer criteria for a monument that aligned with her legislative intent, which preferred a more figurative representation. In describing her justification for this decision, Stefani said, according to the San Francisco Examiner: “As I carried the legislation across the finish line to elevate women in monuments, I wanted to do it in the same way that men have been historically elevated in this city.”

Thomas contested Stefani's statement, claiming that a more figurative, traditional design did not align with the design brief applicants were given, in which the word "statue is crossed out and artwork is replaced." She furthered critiqued the assertion for a "conservative, traditional statue in the manner of European figurative traditional monuments that confederate and colonial monuments are based on" in "San Francisco, that’s known for its progressive politics.” She has also criticized the commission's transparency when they failed to answer her questions and information requests via the city's freedom of information laws.

The commission began their second search in January 2020 with a different set of criteria and a new budget of $250,000. Thomas declined to participate. In August 2020, the Commission apologized to Thomas in August 2020 for system failures. The commissioners then voted to pause the second call for proposals prior to the announcement of the new finalists to engage "stakeholders in a meaningful way". The selection process officially ended on November 2, 2020, when the commissioners awarded Thomas $250,000 for her proposal. Thomas' Portrait of a Phenomenal Woman, a 9-foot bronze book with Angelou's image and quote etched onto it, will be the first monument dedicated to a woman of color on city property and the fourth public monument in the city dedicated to a woman.
