= North Carolina Negro Library Association =

Professional association for black librarians in North Carolina from 1934-1954

- Formation: April 20, 1934; 92 years ago
- Founded at: Raleigh, North Carolina
- Dissolved: November 5, 1954; 71 years ago
- Parent organization: American Library Association

The North Carolina Negro Library Association (NCNLA) was a professional organization for North Carolina's black librarians and library workers. It was the first black library association in the United States and the first black chapter in the American Library Association. It was headquartered in Durham, North Carolina at the North Carolina College for Negroes beginning in 1942.

It was founded on April 20–21, 1934, at Shaw University in Raleigh, North Carolina, with Mollie Huston Lee and A. P. Marshall, two of the original founders. At the time, black librarians could not join the North Carolina Library Association (NCLA) because of racial segregation, however white librarians could join NCNLA and some did. NCNLA joined the American Library Association as a chapter on February 1, 1943.

NCNLA published a mimeographed newsletter, The LIBRARIAN, beginning on November 17, 1937. It also published an organizational handbook in 1940 and began publication of LIBRARY SERVICE REVIEW in 1948.

== Merge with NCLA ==
NCNLA began talks of merging with the North Carolina Library Association in 1948 and the first meeting of a joint committee of the NCLA and NCNLA on the merger of the two organizations was held March 11, 1950. The membership of NCNLA were invited guests to an NCLA annual meeting on April 26–27, 1951 and over 85 black librarians attended.

The American Library Association made a decision to only allow one library association chapter per state, and required that any state chapter be integrated. As a result, NCLA agreed to admit black members in 1954—voting 255 yeses to 107 nos. The two associations merged in 1955 after the NCNLA voted in the recommendations of the Committee on Redesignation at their annual meeting on November 5–6, 1954 under the guidance of Constance Hill Marteena.

NCNLA had their last official meeting as an independent group on November 4–5, 1955 in Charlotte, North Carolina. The NCLA elected their first black president, Dr. Annette Phinazee, in 1975. Dr. Phinazee commented on her presidency,

In other states... the orderly process of integration involved a merger of associations like these. The incumbent president of the larger white associations almost invariably became president of the newly-formed group, with the black president succeeding in the next year. My presidency is 20 years late. The office should have gone first to one of those people who worked so hard, against obstacles the white members of the NCLA have never known.

== Conferences ==
Date	Location	Notable Speakers
April 20–21, 1934	Shaw University	
April 5–6, 1935	St. Augustine's	
April 3–4, 1936	Winston-Salem Teacher's College	Arthur Schomburg
April 2–3, 1937	Fayetteville State Normal School	Alain LeRoy Locke
April 1–2, 1938	North Carolina College for Negroes	James E. Shepard
March 31-April 1, 1939	Livingstone College	Rufus Early Clement
April 5–6, 1940	Rocky Mount, NC	
October 24–25, 1941	Johnson C. Smith University	
February 4–5, 1944	Shaw University	
October 27–28, 1944		Arna Bontemps, Charlotte Hawkins Brown
November 1–2, 1946	Winston-Salem Teacher's College	Rayford Logan
November 1, 1947	Williston Industrial School	Shirley Graham
November 5–6, 1948	William Penn High School	Marion Vera Cuthbert
November 4–5, 1949	West Charlotte High School	Robert Prentiss Daniel
November 3–4, 1950	Booker T. Washington High School	Rufus Early Clement
November 2–3, 1951	North Carolina College for Negroes	Rose Browne
November 7, 1952	Lincoln Junior High School	
November 6–7, 1953	Elizabeth City State Teachers College	
November 5–6, 1954	Elvie Street School	John Hope Franklin
November 4–5, 1955	West Charlotte High School	

== See also ==
- List of libraries in the United States
