= Elizabeth W. Stone Lecture series =

The Elizabeth W. Stone Lecture series at the Catholic University of America honors the contributions of the former dean of the School of Library and Information Science. Elizabeth W. Stone joined the faculty at Catholic University of America in 1961,was named chair of the Department of Library Science in 1972, and Dean in 1981.

The first lecturer in 1990 was Timothy S. Healy, S.J. who was former president of Georgetown University and president of the New York Public Library. Lecturers have included scholars, administrators from the Library of Congress, national library association officers, academic library officers, and alumni.

Year	Lecturer	Title
Richard Huffine	2025	"The Convergence of Data, Information and Knowledge in Practice Today”
Martin R. Kalfatovic	2024	"Finding the Nature of Illumination in Libraries and Museums: Cultural Heritage and the Technology of Culture"
Nicholas Alexander Brown	2023	“Community Engagement & Advocacy in Libraries: How to Thrive in Volatile Times”
Julius C. Jefferson Jr.	2022	“The First Amendment, Race and the Truth: Librarians and Social Justice”
Trevor Owens	2021	“Caring for Digital Collections in the Anthropocene”
No lecture	2020	
Kate Zwaard	2019	“Innovation and Digital Strategy at the Library of Congress”
Dave Shumaker	2018	How to Predict the Future"
Melanie Townsend Diggs	2017	“Being a ‘beacon of light’ in the face of adversity”
Don Collins	2016	"An Oceanographer's Voyage Into Librarianship"
Linda Ueki Absher	2015	
Barbara Stripling	2014	
Blane Dessy	2013	"The Federal Government's Information Sphere & The Myth of Federal Information Policy"
Deanna Marcum	2012	"Leadership for the Digital Age"
Elizabeth Aversa	2011	"A Passion for Libraries - or - Why We Do What We Do"
Clifford Lynch	2010	“Scholarship, Cultural Memory and Libraries in the 21st Century”
Camila Alire	2009	"Issues and Trends in American Libraries"
Andrew K. Pace	2008	"From SLIS to OCLC: An Alumnus Reflects on His Career and the Evolving Profession"
Deanna Marcum	2007	"Culture Shock: The Changing Nature of Library Science Education"
No lecture	2006	
Richard Baker	2005	"History on the Hill: From Gunpowder Paste to the Nuclear Option"
Siva Vaidhyanathan	2004	"The Anarchist in the Library"
Sanford Berman	2003	"Not in My Library: Issues of Workplace Speech and Governance"
Duane Webster	2002	"Reflections on the Future of Scholarly Communications"
Nancy Kranich	2001	"Why Do We Still Need Libraries?"
John Cole	2000	"Bicentennial of the Library of Congress"
Carla Hayden	1999	"Institutional Change in a Traditional Library"
Kurt Cylke	1998	"That All May Read" - National Library Service for the Blind and Physically Handicapped
Henriette Avram	1997	"On the Fourth Decade of the MARC Format"
Mathilde V. Rovelstad	1996	"Temples of Wisdom and Faith: The Picture World of Monastic Libraries of the Baroque Period"
Jeanne Hurley Simon	1995	"The Role of the National Commission on Libraries and Information Science in American Library Development"
Eileen D. Cook	1994	"Lobbying for Libraries: Thirty Years on Capitol Hill"
Hardy R. Franklin	1993	"Customer Service and the Library: The Crucial Link"
William J. Byron, S.J.	1992	"Library Support for Community Service"
Sheilah Kast	1991	"The Public's Right to Know in the Information Age"
Timothy S. Healy, S.J.	1990	"The Role of the Public Library in a Democratic Society"
