= Losing Absalom =

1994 novel by Alexs Pate

- First edition
- Author: Alexs Pate
- Language: English
- Published: 1994, Coffee House Press
- Publication place: United States
- Media type: Print
- Pages: 220 pages
- Awards: Minnesota Book Award, Best First Novel by the Black Caucus of the American Library Association
- ISBN: 1566890179

Losing Absalom is the 1994 debut novel by Alexs Pate. The book was first published on April 1, 1994 through Coffee House Press and follows an African-American family's life and daily struggles in a North Philadelphia inner city.

== Plot ==
In the novel, Absalom Goodman is dying from brain cancer in the hospital where his thoughts drift in and out of the past and present and to his two grown children's lives. Absalom's difficult relationship with his father led him to strive for his children to know gentleness, hard work, and respect but he worries that they have lost sight of these values. His son, Sonny, has moved far away from home and works in white corporate America while his daughter, Rainy, still lives in the family's first home with her boyfriend, aspiring to become a singer and helping her boyfriend deal drugs meanwhile. The novel is the story of this family and their hope in the midst of struggles.

== Reception ==
Critical reception for Losing Absalom has been predominantly positive and MELUS issued a positive review that called it an "appealing representation of the African-American family." Publishers Weekly praised the novel and wrote that "Pate's restrained writing steers clear of the maudlin while gracefully illuminating both the contemporary and timeless aspects to his tale." Philly.com also gave a positive review and stated that "its value transcends racial or cultural boundaries." In contrast, the Library Journal criticized the book as being a "heavy, overwritten" novel.

=== Awards ===
- Minnesota Book Award
- Best First Novel by the Black Caucus of the American Library Association
