= Richard Berry Harrison =

Canadian actor (1864–1935)

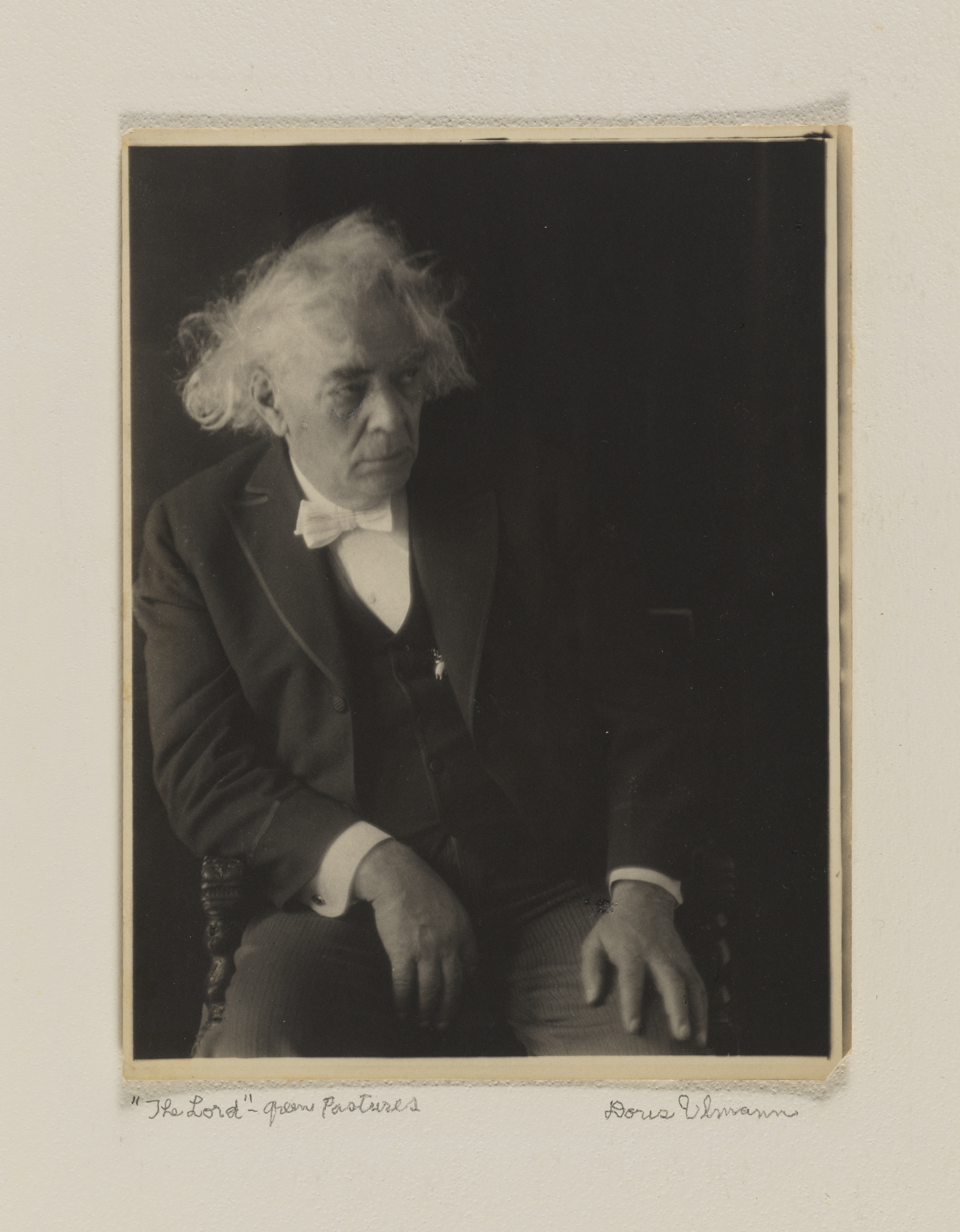
- Berry in 1932
- Born: September 28, 1864
- Died: March 14, 1935

Richard Berry Harrison (September 28, 1864 – March 14, 1935) was an actor, teacher, dramatic reader and lecturer. His parents escaped slavery and settled in Canada. He performed from a young age, studied acting in Detroit, Michigan, and became a dramatic reader and actor in the United States. He was featured on the cover of TIME magazine on March 4, 1935.

== Biography ==
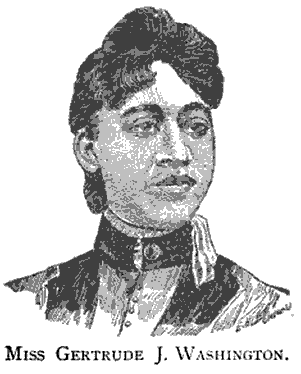

Harrison's parents escaped slavery through the Underground Railroad. Harrison was born in London, Canada West, on September 28, 1864, the eldest of five siblings. His mother named him Richard after seeing a performance of Shakespeare's Richard III. Her interest in theatre placed Harrison on the way to becoming an actor. In his youth, he worked selling newspapers, and managed to work near a local theatre where he would try to get to know the actors. Whenever he saved enough money he would attend the plays. His talents were recognized early in recitations that he would give at school and in church.

After moving to Detroit, he began his dramatic studies at the Detroit Training School of Dramatic Art, and privately with British drama coach Edward Weitzel, drama editor for the Detroit Free Press. From 1892 to 1896, Harrison traveled the U.S., performing as a dramatic reader. Harrison's repertoire included works from Shakespeare and poetry from his friend Paul Laurence Dunbar, including promotional tours for Dunbar's book Oak and Ivy.

He married Gertrude Janet Washington in 1895. She was the first Black person to graduate from the Chicago Conservatory of Music. They had two children, Lawrence Gilbert and Marian Ysobel. He has descendent family members in Kansas City, Missouri and throughout the Kansas City metro area.

Harrison was booked by the New York Federation of Churches, a lyceum that included 1,600 churches.

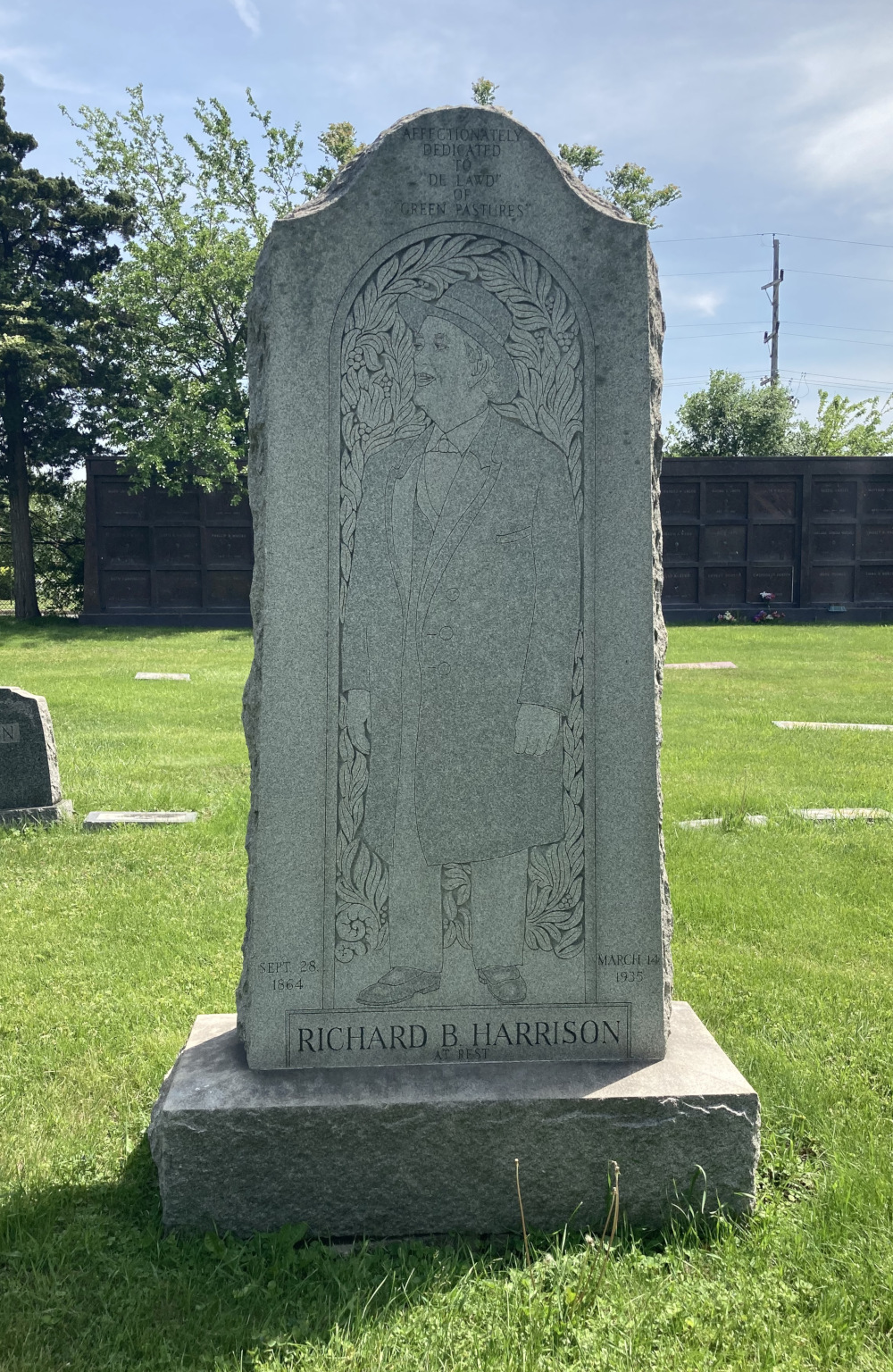
Harrison's grave at Lincoln Cemetery

Harrison became extremely well known after playing "de Lawd" in more than 1,650 performances of Marc Connelly's play, The Green Pastures, which opened on Broadway on February 26, 1930. The show ran for 16 months, then went on tour, appearing in more than 203 cities and towns (including his hometown of London, Ontario, at the Grand Theatre), and later won a Pulitzer Prize for Drama for playwright Connelly in 1931.

He taught elocution and dramatics courses at North Carolina Agricultural and Technical College, Branch Normal College (University of Arkansas at Pine Bluff Arkansas), and Flipper-Key College in Oklahoma.

Harrison died of heart failure in New York City, on March 14, 1935, ten days after he was featured on the cover of TIME magazine. He was buried at Lincoln Cemetery in Blue Island, Illinois.

== Accolades ==
- Received the NAACP's 1931 Spingarn Medal for Distinguished Achievement.
- On his 70th birthday in 1934, he was awarded an honorary Master of Arts degree from Howard University and honorary doctorate degrees in Dramatic Literature from North Carolina Agriculture and Technical College and Lincoln University, and he became the first actor ever to be awarded the Sigma Society Key from Boston University. He had shaken the hands of mayors and received congratulatory telegrams from 14 university presidents and seven governors, was praised by many religious leaders for his performance and was awarded an inscribed Bible from the Clergy Club of New York City.
- A public library in Raleigh, North Carolina, founded by Mollie Huston Lee, was named after Harrison in 1935. In today's Richard B. Harrison Library is also the Richard B. Harrison Community Auditorium.
- Richard B. Harrison High School is named after Harrison, located at Elm, Noble and McHaney Streets in (Selma NC), Blytheville, Arkansas.
- Richard B. Harrison Gymnasium on Noble Street in Selma, North Carolina, North Carolina, former site of Richard B. Harrison High School. Richared B. harrison Alumni Association purchased former Agriculture building as community facility.
- Harrison has also received honorary degrees from many U.S. colleges and universities.
- Due largely to the efforts of documentary filmmaker/ historian Chris Doty, in 2003 an interpretive historical plaque was erected in a London, Ontario, park named in Harrison's honour at the foot of Clarence Street, near where Harrison's childhood home was before it was torched in a race-related incident, hours after the Harrison family moved to Detroit, Michigan, circa 1880. (Harrison's childhood home was located on Wellington Street (west side) immediately north of the Thames River.)
- In 2006, the Richard B. Harrison Auditorium was completed at the North Carolina Agricultural & Technical State University (NC A&T).
- The North Carolina Agriculture and Technical State University's theater company is named after him.
- In 2015 the Harrison Park Square Senior Residence was dedicated to him in Newark, NJ.
