= Annie Florence Petty =

Pioneer North Carolina librarian

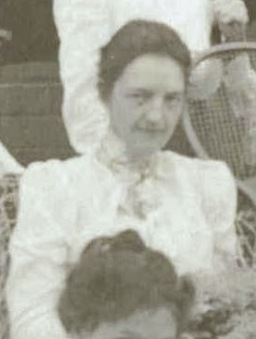
- Annie Petty in 1900
- Born: August 27, 1871; Bush Hill community, Randolph County, North Carolina, U.S.
- Died: 1962
- Education: Library School of the Drexel Institute of Art, Science and Industry
- Occupation: Librarian
- Employer: North Carolina State Normal and Industrial School
- Known for: First professionally educated and trained librarian to work in North Carolina
- Parent(s): William Clinton Petty and Mary Victoria Petty

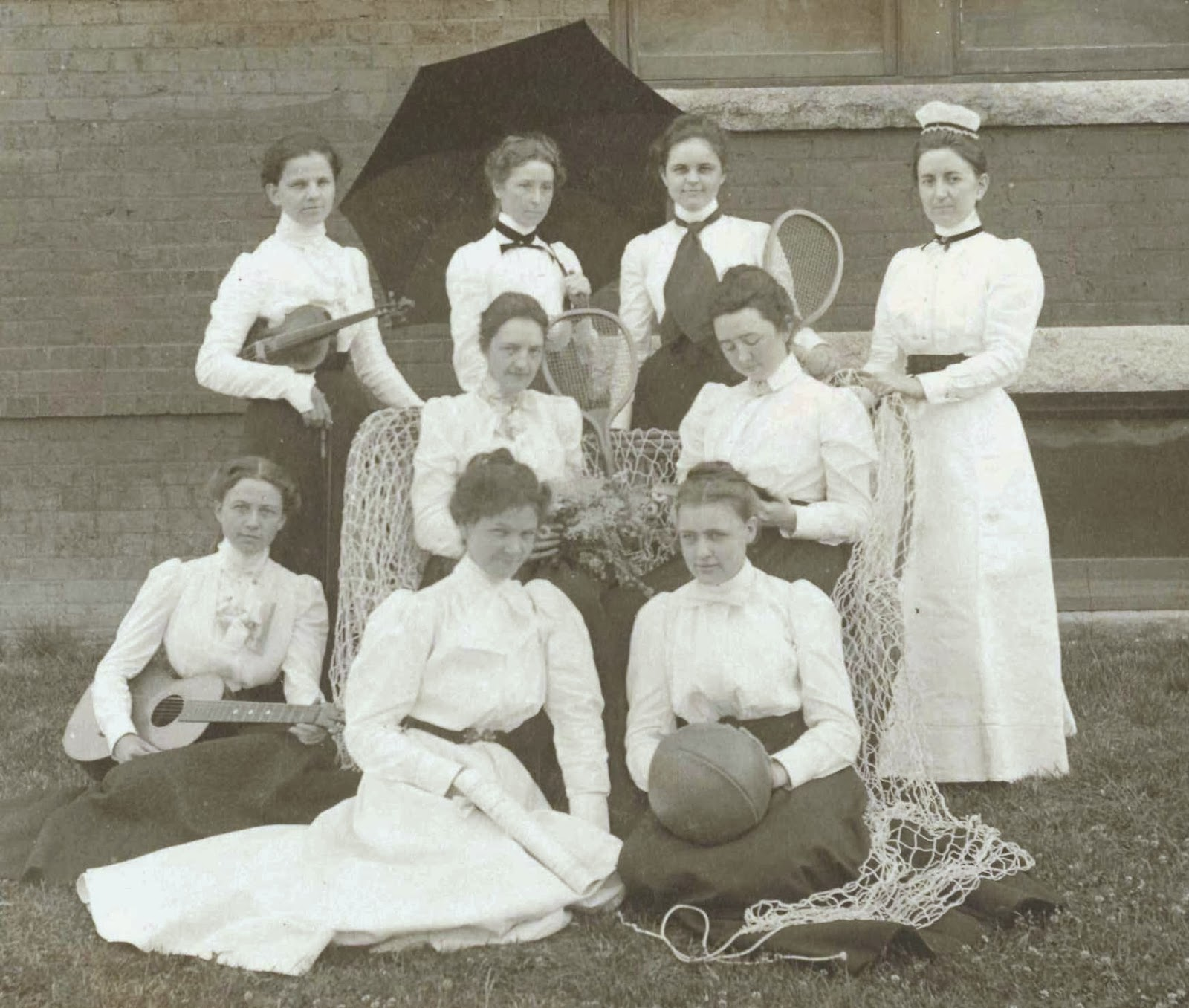
Annie Petty is pictured in the second row, seated in front of tennis racket, in this photograph taken in 1900.

Annie Florence Petty (1871 – 1962) was the first professionally educated and trained librarian to work in the state of North Carolina. She served as the first librarian at the North Carolina State Normal and Industrial School (now the University of North Carolina at Greensboro) and was one of the founding members of the North Carolina Library Association (a state affiliate of the American Library Association).

== Biography ==
Annie Petty was born in the Quaker Bush Hill community of Randolph County, North Carolina on August 27, 1871 to William Clinton and Mary Victoria Petty. She attended the Library School of the Drexel Institute of Art, Science and Industry (now Drexel University) in Philadelphia in 1898, where she received her formal training in the emerging field of librarianship.
