= Deanna B. Marcum =

American librarian, executive (1946–2022)

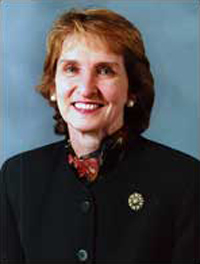
- Born: Deanna Bowling; August 5, 1946; Salem, Indiana, US
- Died: August 16, 2022 (aged 76)
- Education: University of Illinois Chicago (BA); University of Kentucky (MLS); University of Maryland (PhD)
- Occupations: Librarian, nonprofit executive
- Known for: Leadership at the Library of Congress, CLIR, Ithaka S+R

Deanna Bowling Marcum (August 5, 1946 – August 16, 2022) was an American librarian and nonprofit leader who served as president of the Council on Library and Information Resources from 1995 to 2003, Associate Librarian for Library Services at the Library of Congress from 2003 to 2011, and managing director of Ithaka S+R from 2012 to 2016.

== Education and awards ==
Born in Salem, Indiana, Marcum received her Bachelor of Arts degree in English from the University of Illinois at Chicago in 1967 and went on to receive a master's degree in English from the Southern Illinois University in 1969. She taught English and received a master's degree in library science from the University of Kentucky in 1971. Marcum graduated from the University of Maryland in 1991 with a doctor of philosophy degree in American studies. She was awarded a doctorate in humane letters by the North Carolina State University in 2010.

In 2011, the American Library Association awarded her the Melvil Dewey Medal the association's highest honor. In 2016, Marcum received the Miles Conrad Award in recognition of her digital library leadership from the National Federation of Advanced Information Services, which merged with the National Information Standards Organization in 2019.

She was twice selected as speaker at the Elizabeth W. Stone Lecture series in 2007 and 2012.

== Library and nonprofit career ==
Marcum began her career teaching English at the University of Kentucky, where she switched careers to librarianship and worked for three years on a Ford Foundation program at Vanderbilt University. She then worked with the management training program at the Association of Research Libraries from 1977 to 1981.

From 1980 to 1989, she worked for the Council on Library Resources. She served as Dean of the Catholic University of America School of Library and Information Science from 1989 to 1992. She served as director of public service and collection management at the Library of Congress from 1993 to 1995.

In 1995, she was appointed president of the Council on Library Resources and oversaw its merger with the Commission on Preservation and Access to create the Council on Library and Information Resources. She served as president of CLIR until August 2003.

From 2003 to 2011, she returned to the Library of Congress as Associate Librarian for Library Services, directing fifty-three divisions and offices with sixteen hundred employees and guiding the library toward a more digital future. Her areas of expertise included cataloging and preservation.

On January 1, 2012, shortly after her retirement from the Library of Congress, Marcum joined Ithaka S+R, a division of Ithaka Harbors, as its first managing director. She received grants from the Gates Foundation, Lumina Foundation, and Mellon Foundation. She retired in 2016, succeeded by former Vassar College president Catharine Bond Hill, but continued to work for Ithaka S+R as a senior advisor for educational transformation and libraries and scholarly communication until her death in August 2022.

In 2013, she was appointed to the Japan-US Friendship Commission, which facilitates cultural and educational exchanges between the United States and Japan. She also served on steering committees for the Coalition for Networked Information (2008–2012) and the Scholarly Publishing and Academic Resources Coalition (2008–2011).

== Publications ==
- Marcum, Deanna B.; Schonfeld, Roger C. (2021). Along Came Google: A History of Library Digitization. Princeton, N.J.: Princeton University Press. ISBN 978-0-691-17271-2. OCLC 1240575661.
- "Educating the Research Librarian: Are We Falling Short?" (Ithaka S+R Issue Brief, 2015)
- Marcum, Deanna B.; George, Gerald, eds. (2010). The Data Deluge: Can Libraries Cope with E-science?. Kanazawa Institute of Technology International Roundtable on Library and Information Science. Santa Barbara, Calif.: Libraries Unlimited. ISBN 978-0-313-39117-0. OCLC 630057598.
- Marcum, Deanna B., ed. (2001). Development of Digital Libraries: An American Perspective. Kanazawa Institute of Technology International Roundtable on Library and Information Science. Westport, Conn.: Greenwood Press. ISBN 978-0-313-07510-0. OCLC 70765948.
- Marcum, Deanna B. (1994). Good Books in a Country Home: The Public Library as Cultural Force in Hagerstown, Maryland, 1878–1920. Westport, Conn.: Greenwood Press. ISBN 0-313-28626-4. OCLC 28334707.
