= Marva L. DeLoach =

American librarian

Marva LaVerne DeLoach is an African-American librarian and educator whose work in advancing diversity in library science education helped form the current structure for many academic libraries in the U.S. state of California. She was inducted into the California Library Hall of Fame in 2026.

== Career ==
DeLoach got her Bachelors of Science at Savannah State College, her Masters in Library Science from Atlanta University and her Doctorate of Philosophy from the University of Pittsburgh.

DeLoach served as the President of the Black Caucus of the American Library Association from 1986 to 1988. In 2026, she was honored by the California Library Association with induction into the California Library Hall of Fame, as a person whose career has improved the quality of libraries in the state.

As a library science educator at San Jose State University and Diablo Valley College, she supported students and connected local professionals to the ALA. At her institutions, she also aided in the shift of library services from analog to digital at throughout the 1990s and 2000s.

DeLoach has written and educated throughout her career about librarians and library workers of color, as well as the benefits of diversity and inclusion in the field. Much of her written work involves the history of Black librarianship in the United States.

In 2025, she co-published a third edition of the Handbook of Black Librarianship, an updated version that was expanded to include the stories of Black librarians in the 21st century. The original version, which was written by noted writers and activists E. J. Josey and Ann Allen Shockley in 1977, was republished in 2000, having been edited by E. J. Josey and DeLoach. All three editions have been praised for their examinations of the issues confronting Black librarians, both in the US and internationally. The third edition won the BCALA 2025 Literary Award for Outstanding Contribution to Publishing.

== Works ==
- The Higher Education Act of 1965, Title II-B : the fellowships/ traineeships for training in library and information science program : its impact on minority recruitment in library and information science education, by Marva LaVerne DeLoach. Thesis (Ph.D.) - University of Pittsburgh, 1980
- Ethnic Collections in Libraries, (1983) by E. J. Josey and Marva L. DeLoach. ISBN 0918212634
- Handbook of Black Librarianship, 2nd edition (2000) by E.J. Josey and Marva L. DeLoach. ISBN 081083720X
- Handbook of Black Librarianship, 3rd edition (2025) by Andrew P. Jackson, Marva L. DeLoach, and Michele T. Fenton. ISBN 9781538181102
