= 2005 Minneapolis City Council election =

Minneapolis City Council election, 2005
- November 8, 2005

All 13 seats on the Minneapolis City Council 7 seats needed for a majority
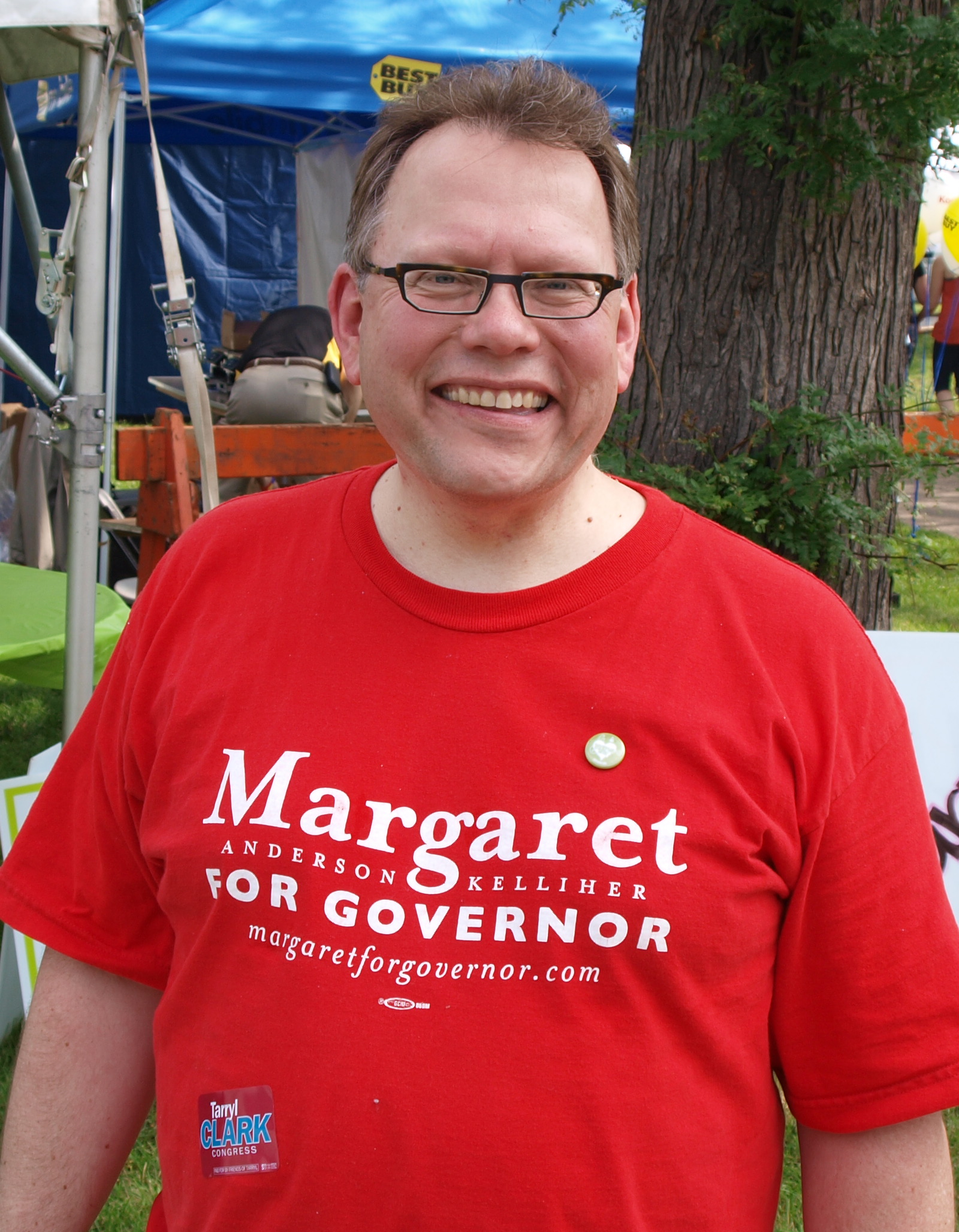

	Majority party	Minority party
Leader	Scott Benson	Natalie Lee
Party	Democratic (DFL)	Green
Leader's seat	Ward 11	Ward 5 (lost re-election)
Last election	10 seats	2 seats
Seats won	12	1
Seat change	▲2	▼1
- Results by ward. The map shows the winning candidate's party affiliations, even though members officially run as nonpartisans.

The 2005 Minneapolis City Council elections were held on November 8, 2005 to elect the 13 members of the Minneapolis City Council for four-year terms.

The election saw the Minnesota Democratic–Farmer–Labor Party (DFL) make a net gain of two seats, giving them a 12-to-1 majority in the Council. Both incumbent Green Party of Minnesota members lost their seats, though the party secured a pickup in Ward 2 with Cam Gordon narrowly winning against the DFL-endorsed candidate. The only independent on the Council lost their seat.

== Electoral system ==
Members were elected from single-member districts. Municipal elections in Minnesota are nonpartisan, although candidates were able to identify with a political party on the ballot.

== Results ==
=== Summary ===
Party	Candidates	Votes		Seats		
Party	Candidates	No.	%	No.	∆No.	%
Democratic–Farmer–Labor Party (DFL)	18	55,274	81.11	12	+2	92.31
Green Party of Minnesota	5	7,610	11.17	1	-1	7.69
Union Liberal	1	594	0.87	0	0	0.00
Independent	1	3,582	5.26	0	-1	0.00
Write-in		1,074	1.58	0	0	0.00
Total			100.00	13	±0	100.00
Valid votes		-	-			
Overvotes		-	-			
Undervotes		-	-			
Turnout (registered voters)						
Source: Minneapolis Elections & Voter Services

=== Ward 1 ===
Minneapolis City Council Ward 1
Party	Candidate	Votes	%
Democratic (DFL)	Paul Ostrow	3,596	67.13
Democratic (DFL)	Erik Johnson	1,718	32.07
Write-in		43	0.80
Total votes		5,357	100
Democratic (DFL) hold			

=== Ward 2 ===
Minneapolis City Council Ward 2
Party	Candidate	Votes	%
Green	Cam Gordon	2,481	51.25
Democratic (DFL)	Erik Johnson	2,340	48.34
Write-in		20	0.41
Total votes		4,841	100
Green gain from Democratic (DFL)			

=== Ward 3 ===
Minneapolis City Council Ward 3
Party	Candidate	Votes	%
Democratic (DFL)	Diane Hofstede	2,407	71.19
Green	Aaron Neumann	946	27.98
Write-in		28	0.83
Total votes		3,381	100
Democratic (DFL) hold			

=== Ward 4 ===
Minneapolis City Council Ward 4
Party	Candidate	Votes	%
Democratic (DFL)	Barb Johnson	3,129	92.19
Write-in		265	7.81
Total votes		3,394	100
Democratic (DFL) hold			

=== Ward 5 ===
Minneapolis City Council Ward 5
Party	Candidate	Votes	%
Democratic (DFL)	Don Samuels	1,718	55.06
Green	Natalie Johnson Lee	1,376	44.10
Write-in		26	0.83
Total votes		3,120	100
Democratic (DFL) gain from Green			

=== Ward 6 ===
Minneapolis City Council Ward 6
Party	Candidate	Votes	%
Democratic (DFL)	Robert Lilligren	1,538	50.61
Green	Dean Zimmermann	1,492	49.10
Write-in		9	0.30
Total votes		3,039	100
Democratic (DFL) gain from Green			

=== Ward 7 ===
Minneapolis City Council Ward 7
Party	Candidate	Votes	%
Democratic (DFL)	Lisa Goodman	5,070	83.97
Democratic (DFL)	Christopher Clark	935	15.49
Write-in		33	0.55
Total votes		3,039	100
Democratic (DFL) hold			

=== Ward 8 ===
Minneapolis City Council Ward 8
Party	Candidate	Votes	%
Democratic (DFL)	Elizabeth Glidden	3,368	58.73
Democratic (DFL)	Marie Hauser	2,323	40.51
Write-in		44	0.77
Total votes		5,735	100
Democratic (DFL) hold			

=== Ward 9 ===
Minneapolis City Council Ward 9
Party	Candidate	Votes	%
Democratic (DFL)	Gary Schiff	2,549	59.13
Green	Dave Bicking	1,315	30.50
Write-in		447	10.37
Total votes		5,735	100
Democratic (DFL) hold			

=== Ward 10 ===
Minneapolis City Council Ward 10
Party	Candidate	Votes	%
Democratic (DFL)	Ralph Remington	2,841	54.45
Democratic (DFL)	Scott Persons	2,328	44.61
Write-in		49	0.94
Total votes		5,218	100
Democratic (DFL) hold			

=== Ward 11 ===
Minneapolis City Council Ward 11
Party	Candidate	Votes	%
Democratic (DFL)	Scott Benson	5,991	90.28
Union Liberal	Gregg A. Iverson	594	8.95
Write-in		51	0.77
Total votes		6,636	100
Democratic (DFL) hold			

=== Ward 12 ===
Minneapolis City Council Ward 12
Party	Candidate	Votes	%
Democratic (DFL)	Sandy Colvin Roy	4,123	53.32
Independent	Kevin McDonald	3,582	46.32
Write-in		28	0.36
Total votes		7,733	100
Democratic (DFL) gain from Independent			

=== Ward 13 ===
Minneapolis City Council Ward 13
Party	Candidate	Votes	%
Democratic (DFL)	Betsy Hodges	5,947	63.73
Democratic (DFL)	Lisa McDonald	3,353	35.93
Write-in		31	0.33
Total votes		9,331	100
Democratic (DFL) hold			
