= North Carolina Library Association =

Professional association for librarians in North Carolina

- Nickname: NCLA
- Formation: May 14, 1904; 122 years ago
- Tax ID no.: 56-6064053
- Parent organization: American Library Association
- Website: nclaonline.org

The North Carolina Library Association (NCLA) is a professional organization for North Carolina's librarians and library workers. It is headquartered in High Point, North Carolina.

The NCLA was founded on May 14, 1904, in Greensboro, North Carolina. The original organization had 32 charter members with Annie Smith Ross from the Carnegie Library in Charlotte as president. Other early presidents included charter members Annie Florence Petty and Joseph Penn Breedlove.

North Carolina had separate associations for black and white librarians until 1955. The North Carolina Negro Library Association (est. 1934) was the first black library association chapter in the ALA. The American Library Association decided to only allow one library association chapter per state, and as a result NCLA agreed to admit black members in 1954 and the two associations merged in 1955.

== Organizational Structure ==
The Executive Committee consists of the President, Vice-President/President-Elect, Secretary, Treasurer, Treasurer Elect, and the four Regional Directors representing the Eastern, Central, Piedmont, and Western regions of North Carolina. All Executive Committee members are elected by the NCLA membership. The Executive Committee along with the representative of the Association to the American Library Association Council, the representative for the North Carolina School Media Library Association, the North Carolina member of the Executive Board of the Southeastern Library Association, the editor of North Carolina Libraries, and the chairs from each of the sections and committees comprise the NCLA Executive Board.

== See also ==
- List of libraries in the United States
