= Ypsilanti Courier =

Weekly newspaper in Ypsilanyi, Michigan

- Type: Weekly newspaper
- Format: Broadsheet
- Owner: 21st Century Media
- Editor: James Pruitt
- Founded: 1994
- Headquarters: 106 West Michigan Avenue; Saline, Michigan 48176; United States
- OCLC number: 52344962
- Website: ypsilanticourier.com

The Ypsilanti Courier is a weekly newspaper based in Ypsilanti, Michigan. The Ypsilanti Courier is part of Heritage Newspapers, a conglomerate of weekly newspapers in Washtenaw County owned by 21st Century Media, part of Digital First Media. The newspaper provides news, life, sports and entertainment news from Ypsilanti and Washtenaw County, Michigan.
