= Alexs Pate =

American writer and educator

Alexs D. Pate
- Born: June 9, 1950 (age 76)
- Occupations: Author; poet; technology consultant
- Website: alexsdpate.com

Alexs D. Pate (born June 9, 1950) is an American writer from Minneapolis known for his books about the Black experience. His 1995 novel Amistad was on the New York Times Bestseller list in 1995.

== Early life and education ==
Pate grew up in North Philadelphia, within the Black Power movement. He often went to the library and wrote his first poetry when he was still in high school. He joined the Navy after high school and toured the Atlantic during the Vietnam War.

Pate moved to Minneapolis, Minnesota to work for Control Data. He has an MFA from the University of Southern Maine.

== Career ==
Pate began writing because, he said, "all the accumulated images of Black men being pursued, being beat down, had reached its saturation point in my consciousness, and I could not survive it any longer if I didn't come up with a way of responding to that." He has taught at Macalester College and Naropa University. He taught African American and African Studies at the University of Minnesota as an assistant professor. He was also a writing teacher at the University of Southern Maine's Stonecoast MFA program.

Pate's first novel, Losing Absalom, won a Minnesota Book Award in 1995. It was also awarded "Best First Novel" from the Black Caucus of the American Library Association. In 1995, he was commissioned by DreamWorks to write Amistad based on the movie's screenplay.

== Technology work ==
Pate is the President of Innocent Technologies which has created of The Innocent Classroom, a program for K-12 educators which tries to close "the relationship gap between educators and students of color." He wrote a book about the project called The Innocent Classroom: Dismantling Racial Bias to Support Students of Color helping teachers in assisting students in overcoming their own experiences of negative stereotyping, allowing them to learn more easily. The project has trained 3,600 educators in school districts across the country.

== Awards and honors ==
- Minnesota Book Awards Kay Sexton Award (2021)
- Honor Fiction Book Award by the Black Caucus of the American Library Association for West of Rehoboth (2002)
- Minnesota Book Award for The Multicultiboho Sideshow (2000)
- New York Times Bestseller List for Amistad (1995)
- Minnesota Book Award for Losing Absalom (1995)
- Best First Novel Award by Black Caucus of the American Library Association for Losing Absalom (1994)
