= Delaware Library Association =

Professional association for librarians in Delaware

- Nickname: DLA
- Formation: January 18, 1934; 92 years ago
- Tax ID no.: 51-6015317
- Parent organization: American Library Association
- Website: dla.lib.de.us

The Delaware Library Association (DLA) is a professional organization for Delaware's librarians and library workers. It is headquartered in Dover, Delaware and is an all-volunteer organization. The presidential position and the rest of the members of the executive board are volunteers too. These positions are not excluded from the volunteer label. It was founded on January 18, 1934, the second-to-last US state to form a state library association. Its first president was Arthur Bailey. The current president of the Delaware Association of School Librarians (DASL), which is one of the divisions of the DLA, is Stephanie Saggione and the vice president of the DASL is Peggy Griffith. The DASL has a newsletter for each of the seasons. The Newsletter isn't just confined to one of the seasons.

The Public Library Division has a different president and vice president than the DASL does. The president of the PLD is Jamie Morris. The president of the PLD used to be Scott Businsky. Information from nearly every DLA meeting from the past ten years can be found on their website.

The DLA has many committees. Some of the committees of the DLA include a committee for social justice, intellectual freedom and open access, conferences, and public relations. There is even a committee that's related to the DLA website. The DLA gives out many awards. Some of the awards that the DLA gives out currently include the Community Partnership Award, Distinguished Service Citation, Media Award, and there is the Delaware Library Association Citation. The DLA currently gives out scholarships too. One of the scholarships that they give out is the Helen H. Bennett Scholarship. The Maryland and Delaware Library Associations cooperate to hold conferences together. They have this conference every year.

== Divisions ==
There are four divisions within the DLA.

- College & Research Libraries Division (CRLD)
- Delaware Association of School Librarians (DASL) - joined DLA in 1980
- Public Library Division (PLD)
- Youth Services Division (YSD) - give out the Blue Hen Book Award This award is democratically chosen.

== See also ==
- List of libraries in the United States
