= Black Caucus of the American Library Association =

Professional association for Black librarians in the American Library Association

- Nickname: BCALA
- Formation: 1970; 56 years ago
- Founded at: Chicago, Illinois, United States
- Tax ID no.: 52-1892263
- Headquarters: Hyattsville, Maryland, United States
- President: James Allen Davis Jr.
- Parent organization: American Library Association
- Website: www.bcala.org

The Black Caucus of the American Library Association (BCALA) is an affiliate of the American Library Association (ALA) that focuses on the needs of African-American library professionals by promoting careers in librarianship, funding literacy initiatives, and providing scholarships.

== History ==
While work began to organize a Black Caucus of the American Library Association in 1968, this work increased in 1969 when E. J. Josey was appointed to the American Library Association Nominating Committee. For the 1970 Midwinter meeting, black librarians were encouraged to find socially responsible candidates, African American and Caucasian American, for the 1971 council. During the 1970 Midwinter meeting, a Black Caucus was formed to meet the unmet needs of the African American library professionals with Josey as the chairman.

The Black Caucus was not officially affiliated with the ALA until 1992; the first National Conference of African American Librarians (NCAAL) was also held in 1992.

As an advocacy and solidarity organization, BCALA campaigned to save the library studies program at Clark Atlanta University, a historically black university that had educated the majority of African-American librarians until its closing. Following the 2010 Haiti earthquake, the BCALA Haitian Relief Fund was created to support relief efforts through the Save the Children Fund and the American Red Cross. In 2015, BCALA planted a tree in Ferguson, Missouri, in honor of Michael Brown.

In 2006, BCALA took part in the first Joint Conference of Librarians of Color, along with the American Indian Library Association, the Asian Pacific American Librarians Association, the Chinese American Librarians Association, and REFORMA. This conference was the first national conference sponsored and held by those organizations, which are known as the Associations of Ethnic Librarians.

The Joint Council of Librarians of Color (JCLC, Inc.) was founded in June 2015 as an organization “that advocates for and addresses the common needs of the American Library Association ethnic affiliates“; these ethnic affiliates include BCALA, as well as the American Indian Library Association, the Asian Pacific American Librarians Association, the Chinese American Librarians Association, and REFORMA: The National Association to Promote Library & Information Services to Latinos and the Spanish Speaking.

== Goals ==
Mission Statement (revised 1995)

BCALA Mission: The Black Caucus of the American Library Association serves as an advocate for the development, promotion, and improvement of library services and resources to the nation's African-American community; and provides leadership for the recruitment and professional development of African-American librarians.

== Membership ==
Fees/levels are:

- Student $10
- Library Support Staff $20
- Retired $25
- Regular $45
- Institutional/Institutions $60
- Corporate $200
- Lifetime $500

== Awards ==
The BCALA offers awards for books, e-books, innovative leaders (referred to as trailblazers), and a scholarship in honor of E. J. Josey.

The BCALA Literary Book Awards were first presented at the Second National Conference of African American Librarians in 1994. Awards are given for four categories: Fiction, Nonfiction, Poetry Collection, and First Novel. The initial First Novel Award went to Alexs Pate, for the novel Losing Absalom. Some of the recent book awards have been for The Twelve Tribes of Hattie and If One of Us Should Fall. The SELF-e literary award, recognizing self-published poetry and fiction, was created in 2015 by BCALA in partnership with BiblioBoard, becoming the first ebook award sponsored by an organization affiliated with the American Library Association.

In 2021 the BCALA launched the Children & Young Adult Literary Awards to honor outstanding books that celebrate the diversity of the Black experience, offering young readers essential windows, mirrors, and sliding glass doors to see themselves and their communities reflected in literature.

The Black Books Galore! contest was sponsored by BCALA to public and school library programs that support increased awareness of African-American children's literature through public programming.

=== Adult Literary Awards ===
List of BCALA Literary Award winners — Adult Literary Awards
Year	Award	Title	Recipient	Result
2026	1st Novelist Award	Dominion: A Novel	Addie E. Citchens	Won
2026	Best Poetry Award	The Lost Songs of Nina Simone	Shonda Buchanan	Won
2026	Fiction	Minor Black Figures: A Novel	Brandon Taylor	Won
2026	Nonfiction	Toni at Random: The Iconic Writer's Legendary Editorship	Dana A. Williams	Won
2025	1st Novelist Award	All We Were Promised	Ashton Lattimore	Won
2025	Best Poetry Award	Magic Enuff	Tara M. Stringfellow	Won
2025	Fiction	James: A Novel	Percival Everett	Won
2025	Nonfiction	Medgar & Myrlie: Medgar Evers and the Love Story That Awakened America	Joy-Ann Reid	Won
2024	1st Novelist Award	Moonrise Over New Jessup: A Novel	Jamila Minnicks	Won
2024	Best Poetry Award	Above Ground: Poems	Clint Smith	Won
2024	Fiction	All the Sinners Bleed	S. A. Cosby	Won
2024	Nonfiction	Black AF History: The Un-Whitewashed Story of America	Michael Harriot	Won
2023	Fiction	Take My Hand	Dolen Perkins-Valdez	Won
2023	First Novel	Black Cake	Charmaine Wilkerson	Won
2023	Nonfiction	The Tuskegee Student Uprising: A History	Brian Jones	Won
2023	Poetry	A Peculiar People	Steven Willis	Won
2022	1st Novelist	The Love Songs of W.E.B. Du Bois	Honorée Fanonne Jeffers	Won
2022	Fiction	Razorblade Tears	S. A. Cosby	Won
2022	Nonfiction	Just As I Am: A Memoir	Cicely Tyson	Won
2022	Poetry	Black Girl, Call Home	Jasmine Mans	Won
2021	Fiction	The Vanishing Half	Brit Bennett	Won
2021	First Novel	Everywhere You Don't Belong	Gabriel Bump	Won
2021	First Novel	Fifty Words for Rain	Asha Lemmie	Won
2021	Nonfiction	Begin Again: James Baldwin's America and Its Urgent Lessons for Our Own	Eddie S. Glaude, Jr.	Won
2021	Poetry	African American Poetry: 250 Years of Struggle and Song	Kevin Young	Won
2020	Fiction	The Nickel Boys	Colson Whitehead	Won
2020	First Novel	The Water Dancer	Ta-Nehisi Coates	Won
2020	Nonfiction	Dapper Dan: Made in Harlem: A Memoir	Daniel R. Day	Won
2020	Poetry	1919	Eve L. Ewing	Won
2019	Fiction	An American Marriage	Tayari Jones	Won
2019	First Novel	They Come in All Colors: A Novel	Malcolm Hansen	Won
2019	Nonfiction	Becoming	Michelle Obama	Won
2019	Nonfiction	The New Negro: The Life of Alain Locke	Jeffrey C. Stewart	Won
2018	Fiction	Difficult Women	Roxane Gay	Won
2018	Nonfiction	Chester B. Himes: A Biography	Lawrence P. Jackson	Won
2018	Poetry	Incendiary Art: Poems	Patricia Smith	Won
2017	Fiction	Another Brooklyn	Jacqueline Woodson	Won
2017	First Novel	Grace	Natashia Deón	Won
2017	Nonfiction	Hidden Figures: The American Dream and the Untold Story of the Black Women Mathematicians Who Helped Win the Space Race	Margot Lee Shetterly	Won
2017	Poetry	Counting Descent	Clint Smith	Won
2016	Fiction	God Help the Child	Toni Morrison	Won
2016	First Novel	The Turner House	Angela Flournoy	Won
2016	Nonfiction	Spectacle: The Astonishing Life of Ota Benga	Pamela Newkirk	Won
2016	Poetry	Wild Hundreds (Pitt Poetry Series)	Nate Marshall	Won
2015	Fiction	Citizens Creek: A Novel	Lalita Tademy	Won
2015	First Novel	Forty Acres: A Thriller	Dwayne Alexander Smith	Won
2015	Nonfiction	Visible Man: The Life of Henry Dumas	Jeffrey B. Leak	Won
2015	Poetry	Book of Hours: Poems	Kevin Young	Won
2014	Fiction	The Good Lord Bird	James McBride	Won
2014	First Novel	The Supremes at Earl's All-You-Can-Eat	Edward Kelsey Moore	Won
2014	Nonfiction	Ebony and Ivy: Race, Slavery, and the Troubled History of America's Universities	Craig Steven Wilder	Won
2014	Poetry	Chasing Utopia: A Hybrid	Nikki Giovanni	Won
2013	Fiction	Freeman	Leonard Pitts Jr.	Won
2013	First Novel	The Twelve Tribes of Hattie	Ayana Mathis	Won
2013	Nonfiction	Benjamin Elijah Mays, Schoolmaster of the Movement: A Biography	Randal Maurice Jelks	Won
2013	Poetry	Appalachian Elegy: Poetry and Place	bell hooks	Won
2012	Nonfiction	The Indignant Generation: A Narrative History of African American Writers and Critics, 1934-1960	Lawrence P. Jackson	Won
2012	Poetry	Mule & Pear (New Issues Poetry & Prose)	Rachel Eliza Griffiths	Won
2011	Fiction	Glorious	Bernice L. McFadden	Won
2011	First Novel	Wench	Dolen Perkins-Valdez	Won
2011	Nonfiction	The Other Wes Moore: One Name, Two Fates	Wes Moore	Won
2010	Fiction	Buying Time	Pamela Samuels Young	Won
2010	First Novel	My Sister's Veil	K.C. Marshall	Won
2010	Nonfiction	The Breakthrough: Politics and Race in the Age of Obama	Gwen Ifill	Won
2009	Fiction	Trading Dreams at Midnight	Diane McKinney-Whetstone	Won
2009	First Novel	Orange Mint and Honey	Carleen Brice	Won
2009	Nonfiction	Ida: A Sword Among Lions	Paula J. Giddings	Won
2008	Fiction	New England White	Stephen L. Carter	Won
2008	First Novel	The Rise: Where Neighbors Are Sometimes More	Chantal Ellen	Won
2008	Nonfiction	Ralph Ellison: A Biography	Arnold Rampersad	Won
2007	Fiction	After	Marita Golden	Won
2007	Nonfiction	The Audacity of Hope: Thoughts on Reclaiming the American Dream	Barack Obama	Won
2007	Nonfiction	Medical Apartheid: The Dark History of Medical Experimentation on Black Americans from Colonial Times to the Present	Harriet A. Washington	Won
2006	Fiction	Third Girl from the Left	Martha Southgate	Won
2006	First Novel	Freshwater Road	Denise Nicholas	Won
2006	Nonfiction	Black Crescent: The Experience and Legacy of African Muslims in the Americas	Michael A. Gomez	Won
2005	Fiction	Leaving Cecil Street	Diane McKinney-Whetstone	Won
2005	First Novel	The Darkest Child	Delores Phillips	Won
2005	Nonfiction	A Continent for the Taking: The Tragedy and Hope of Africa	Howard W. French	Won
2004	Fiction	Hottentot Venus	Barbara Chase-Riboud	Won
2004	First Novel	The Known World	Edward P. Jones	Won
2004	Nonfiction	In Black and White: The Life of Sammy Davis, Jr.	Wil Haygood	Won
2003	Fiction	Douglass' Women: A Novel	Jewell Parker Rhodes	Won
2003	First Novel	The Emperor of Ocean Park	Stephen L. Carter	Won
2003	Nonfiction	Forgotten Readers: Recovering the Lost History of African American Literary Societies	Elizabeth McHenry	Won
2002	Fiction	I Wish I Had a Red Dress	Pearl Cleage	Won
2002	First Novel	Gabriel's Story	David Anthony Durham	Won
2002	Nonfiction	Vernon Can Read! A Memoir	Vernon E. Jordan	Won
2001	Fiction	The Fisher King: A Novel	Paule Marshall	Won
2001	First Novel	Where I'm Bound: A Novel	Allen B. Ballard	Won
2001	Nonfiction	Slavery in Florida: Territorial Days to Emancipation	Larry Eugene Rivers	Won
2000	Fiction	Ain't Nobody's Business If I Do	Valerie W. Wesley	Won
2000	First Novel	Inner City Blues	Paula L. Woods	Won
2000	Nonfiction	Homelands and Waterways: The American Journey of the Bond Family, 1846-1926	Adele Logan Alexander	Won
1999	Fiction	The Healing	Gayl Jones	Won
1999	Nonfiction	Spirits of the Cloth: Contemporary African American Quilts	Carolyn Mazloomi	Won
1998	Fiction	The River Where Blood Is Born	Sandra Jackson-Opoku	Won
1998	First Novel	The View From Here	Brian Keith Jackson	Won
1998	Nonfiction	An Original Man: The Life and Times of Elijah Muhammad	Claude Andrew Clegg	Won
1998	Nonfiction	The Black Notebooks: An Interior Journey	Toi Derricotte	Won
1997	Fiction	Sarah's Psalm	Florence Ladd	Won
1997	First Novel	Push	Sapphire	Won
1997	Nonfiction	Sojourner Truth: A Life, A Symbol	Nell Irvin Painter	Won
1996	Fiction	RL's Dream	Walter Mosley	Won
1996	First Novel	An Open Weave	Devorah Major	Won
1996	Nonfiction	Brotherman: The Odyssey of Black Men in America	Herb Boyd	Won
1995	Fiction	Rattlebone	Maxine Clair	Won
1995	Fiction	I Hear a Symphony: African Americans Celebrate Love	Felix H. Liddell	Won
1995	First Novel	Serpent's Gift	Helen Elaine Lee	Won
1995	Nonfiction	I've Known Rivers: Lives of Loss and Liberation	Sara Lawrence-Lightfoot	Won
1994	Fiction	A Lesson Before Dying	Ernest J. Gaines	Won
1994	First Novel	Losing Absalom	Alexs D. Pate	Won
1994	Nonfiction	W. E. B. Du Bois, 1868-1919: Biography of a Race	David Levering Lewis	Won

=== Children & Youth Literary Awards ===
List of BCALA Literary Award winners — Children & Youth Literary Awards
Year	Award	Title	Recipient	Result
2026	Debut	Needy Little Things	Channelle Desamours	Won
2026	Fiction	A Place for Us	James Ransome (text/illustrations)	Won
2026	Nonfiction	Go Tell It: How James Baldwin Became a Writer	Quartez Harris and Gordon C. James	Won
2026	Poetry	The Lost Songs of Nina Simone	Shonda Buchanan	Won
2025	Fiction	Bright Red Fruit	Safia Elhillo	Won
2025	Graphic Novel	Safe Passage	G. Neri	Won
2025	Nonfiction	A Voice of Hope: The Myrlie Evers-Williams Story	Nadia Salomon	Won
2025	Poetry/Debut	Something Like Right	H.D. Hunter	Won
2024	Fiction	Promise Boys	Nick Brooks	Won
2024	First Novelist Award	The Davenports	Krystal Marquis	Won
2024	Graphic Novel	Curlfriends: New in Town	Sharee Miller	Won
2024	Nonfiction	Jerry Changed the Game!	Don Tate and Cherise Harris	Won
2023	Debut Author	Love Radio	Ebony Ladelle	Won
2023	Fiction	Lotus Bloom & the Afro Revolution	Sherri Winston	Won
2023	Graphic Novel	Swim Team	Johnnie Christmas	Won
2023	Nonfiction	Star Child	Ibi Zoboi	Won
2022	1st Novelist	When Langston Dances	Kaija Langley	Won
2022	Fiction	The Cost of Knowing	Brittney Morris	Won
2022	Graphic Novel	The Black Panther Party: A Graphic Novel History	David F. Walker	Won
2022	Nonfiction	Nina: A Story of Nina Simone	Traci N. Todd	Won
2021	1st Novelist	A Good Kind of Trouble	Lisa Moore Ramée	Won
2021	Fiction	I Am Every Good Thing	Derrick Barnes	Won
2021	Fiction	Not So Pure and Simple	Lamar Giles	Won
2021	Graphic Novel	Twins	Varian Johnson	Won
2021	Nonfiction	The Talk: Conversations about Race, Love, and Truth	Wade Hudson	Won

== Conferences ==
The National Conference of African American Librarians (NCAAL) has been held nine times since 1992; the first conference was held in Columbus, Ohio, and organized by Sylvia Sprinkle-Hamlin, conference chair. The schedule of 70 programs included a focus on African-American librarians supporting each other professionally as well as highlighting the work of African American authors and performers. Conferences have continually provided an opportunity for black librarians to network, build community, and address current concerns, such as the need for library subject headings that will allow for easy access to African-American collections.

The August 2015 Conference was held in St. Louis, Missouri. The next National Conference of African American Librarians will be held from August 5–9, in Tulsa, Oklahoma, in 2020.

In 2006, BCALA took part in the first Joint Council of Librarians of Color (JCLC), along with the American Indian Library Association, the Asian Pacific American Librarians Association, the Chinese American Librarians Association, and REFORMA.

== Publications ==
BCALA publications include an Annual Report and Membership Directory and Newsletter.

== Governing structure ==
The BCALA has a president and works through their various committees.

=== Past presidents ===
Most presidents serve two to three consecutive years.

- 1970–1971: E. J. Josey
- 1971–1973: William D. Cunningham
- 1973–1974: James R. Wright
- 1974–1976: Harry Robinson, Jr.
- 1976–1978: Avery Williams
- 1978–1980: Dr. George C. Grant
- 1980-1982: Doreitha R. Madden
- 1982–1984: Robert L. Wright
- 1984–1986: Barbara Williams Jenkins
- 1986–1988: Marva L. DeLoach
- 1988–1990: Edith M. Fisher
- 1990–1992: John C. Tyson
- 1992–1994: D. Alex Boyd
- 1994–1996: Stanton F. Biddle
- 1996–1998: Sylvia Sprinkle-Hamlin
- 1998–2000: Gregory Reese
- 2000–2002: Gladys Smiley Bell
- 2002–2004: Bobby Player
- 2004–2006: Andrew P. Jackson (Sekou Molefi Baako)
- 2006–2008: Wanda Kay Brown
- 2008–2010: Karolyn S. Thompson
- 2010–2012: Jos N. Holman
- 2012–2014: Jerome Offord, Jr.
- 2014–2016: Kelvin A. Watson
- 2016–2018: Denyvetta Davis
- 2018–2020: Richard E. Ashby, Jr.
- 2020–2022: Shauntee Burns-Simpson
- 2022–2024: Nichelle M. Hayes
- 2024-2026: Wanda Kay Brown
- 2026-2028: James Allen Davis Jr.

=== Committees ===
- Affiliates
- Awards Committee
- Budget and Finance
- Constitution and Bylaws
- Dr. John C. Tyson (Award Committee)
- Fundraising
- International Relations
- Membership
- Nomination and Election
- Program
- Publications
- Recruitment and Professional Development
- Technology Advisory

== See also ==
- American Library Association
- List of libraries in the United States
