= List of U.S. state library associations =

Below is a continuation of the North America section of the List of library associations. Included are state associations, school library associations, and special library associations that are specific to an American state.

== Alabama ==
- Alabama Library Association Website
- Alabama School Library Association Website

== Alaska ==
- Alaska Library Association Website

== Arizona ==
- Arizona Library Association Website
- Medical Library Group of Southern California & Arizona Website

== Arkansas ==
- Arkansas Library Association Website

== California ==
- California Academic & Research Libraries Association Website
- California Library Association Website
- Medical Library Group of Southern California & Arizona Website
- Los Angeles Chapter of Association for Information Science & Technology Website
- LILi: Lifelong Information Literacy Website
- Society of California Archivists Website

== Colorado ==
- Colorado Association of Libraries Website
- Colorado Council of Medical Librarians Website
- Colorado Library Consortium CLiC website

== Connecticut ==
- Connecticut Library Association Website

== Delaware ==
- Delaware Library Association Website
- Delaware Association of School Librarians Website

== District of Columbia ==
- District of Columbia Library Association Website

== Florida ==
- Florida Library Association Website
- Florida Association for Media in Education Website
- Palm Beach County Library Association

== Georgia ==
- Atlanta Law Libraries Association Website
- Georgia Health Sciences Library Association Website
- Georgia Library Association Website
- Georgia Library Media Association, Inc. Website

== Hawaii ==
- Hawaii Library Association Website

== Idaho ==
- Cache Valley Library Association Website
- Idaho Library Association Website

== Illinois ==
- Illinois Library Association Website
- Illinois School Library Media Association Website

== Indiana ==
- Association of Indiana School Library Educators Website
- Indiana Black Librarians Network Website
- Indiana Chapter of Special Libraries Association Website
- Indiana Health Sciences Librarians Association Website
- Indiana Library Federation Website
- Indiana Online Users Group Website
- Indiana Public Library Association Website

== Iowa ==
- Iowa Library Association Website

== Kansas ==
- Kansas Library Association Website

== Kentucky ==
- Kentucky Library Association Website
- Kentucky Public Library Association Website
- Kentucky Association of School Librarians Website

== Louisiana ==
- Louisiana Library Association Website

== Maine ==
- Maine Association of School Libraries Website
- Maine Library Association Website

== Maryland ==
- Maryland Association of School Libraries Website
- Maryland Library Association Website

== Massachusetts ==
- Massachusetts Library Association Website

== Michigan ==
- Michigan Library Association Website
- Michigan Academic Library Association Website
- Michigan Health Sciences Library Association Website

== Minnesota ==
- Minnesota Library Association Website
- Health Science Libraries of Minnesota Website

== Mississippi ==
- Mississippi Library Association Website

== Missouri ==
- Missouri Association of School Librarians Website
- Missouri Library Association Website

== Montana ==
- Montana Library Association Website

== Nebraska ==
- Nebraska Library Association Website

== Nevada ==
- Nevada Library Association Website

== New Hampshire ==
- New Hampshire Library Association Website
- New Hampshire Library Trustees Association Website
- New Hampshire School Library Media Association Website

== New Jersey ==
- New Jersey Library Association Website

== New Mexico ==
- Border Regional Library Association
- New Mexico Library Association Website

== New York ==
- Metropolitan New York Library Council (METRO) Website
- New York Library Association Website

== North Carolina ==
- North Carolina Library Association Website
- North Carolina School Library Media Association Website
- North Carolina Special Libraries Association Website

== North Dakota ==
- North Dakota Library Association Website

== Ohio ==
- Academic Library Association of Ohio Website
- Ohio Educational Library Media Association Website
- Ohio Library Council Website

== Oklahoma ==
- Oklahoma Library Association Website

== Oregon ==
- Oregon Library Association Website

== Pennsylvania ==
- Pennsylvania Library Association Website

== Rhode Island ==
- Rhode Island Library Association Website

== South Carolina ==
- South Carolina Library Association Website

== South Dakota ==
- South Dakota Library Association Website

== Tennessee ==
- Tennessee Association of School Libraries Website
- Tennessee Library Association Website
- Tenn-Share Website

== Texas ==
- Border Regional Library Association
- Texas Library Association Website

== Utah ==
- Cache Valley Library Association Website
- Utah Library Association Website
- Utah Educational Library Media Association Website

== Vermont ==
- Vermont Library Association Website

== Virginia ==
- Virginia Library Association Website

== Washington ==
- Washington Library Association Website

== West Virginia ==
- West Virginia Library Association Website

== Wisconsin ==
- Wisconsin Library Association Website

== Wyoming ==
- Wyoming Library Association Website

== See also ==
- American Library Association
- Library
- List of libraries in the United States
- List of library associations in the United States
- List of library consortia in the United States
- Public Library
