= MLA =

MLA may refer to:

== Arts and entertainment ==
- M.L.A. (1957 film), an Indian Telugu-language film by K. B. Tilak
- MLA (2018 Kannada film), an Indian film by Mourya Manjunath
- MLA (2018 Telugu film), an Indian film by Upendra Madhav
- Muv-Luv Alternative

== Business ==
- Mandated Lead Arranger, a bank in charge of organizing a syndicated loan
- McKenna Long & Aldridge, a United States–based international law and public policy firm
- Mitsubishi Logisnext Americas, a material handling equipment manufacturer based in Houston, Texas

== Government and politics ==
- Member of the Legislative Assembly, a politician serving in a legislature, in many countries
  - Member of the Legislative Assembly (India)
  - Member of the Legislative Assembly (Northern Ireland)
  - Member of the Legislative Assembly (Malaysia)

== Organizations ==
- Massachusetts Lobstermen's Association
- Master Locksmiths Association, United Kingdom
- Meat and Livestock Australia, Australian not-for-profit organisation of red meat producers
- Modern Language Association, United States of America
  - MLA Handbook, published by the association, replacing MLA Style Manual

=== Library organizations ===
- Maine Library Association, professional association for librarians in Maine
- Maryland Library Association, professional association for librarians in Maryland
- Massachusetts Library Association, professional association for librarians in Massachusetts
- Medical Library Association, United States
- Michigan Library Association, professional association for librarians in Michigan
- Minnesota Library Association, professional association for librarians in Minnesota
- Mississippi Library Association, professional association for librarians in Mississippi
- Montana Library Association, professional association for librarians in Montana
- Museums, Libraries and Archives Council, United Kingdom
- Music Library Association, United States

== Professions and degrees ==
- Master of Landscape Architecture, a professional qualification
- Master of Liberal Arts, a master's degree
- Medical Laboratory Assistant, an assistant to a biomedical scientist

== Other ==
- Malaysia, ITU country code
- Malta International Airport, IATA airport code
- Mercury Laser Altimeter, an instrument on MESSENGER space probe
- Methyllycaconitine, a nicotinic acetylcholine receptor antagonist
- Mobile Location Analytics, a type of customer intelligence
- Montessori Lyceum Amsterdam, a school in Amsterdam, Netherlands
- Mutual legal assistance treaty, an agreement between two countries for the purpose of gathering and exchanging information in an effort to enforce public laws or criminal laws
- Tamambo language, ISO 639 language code
- Micro lens array, see as well Holographic optical element, Light field camera
