= Wood industry =

Group of economic activities related to the production of wood and forest products

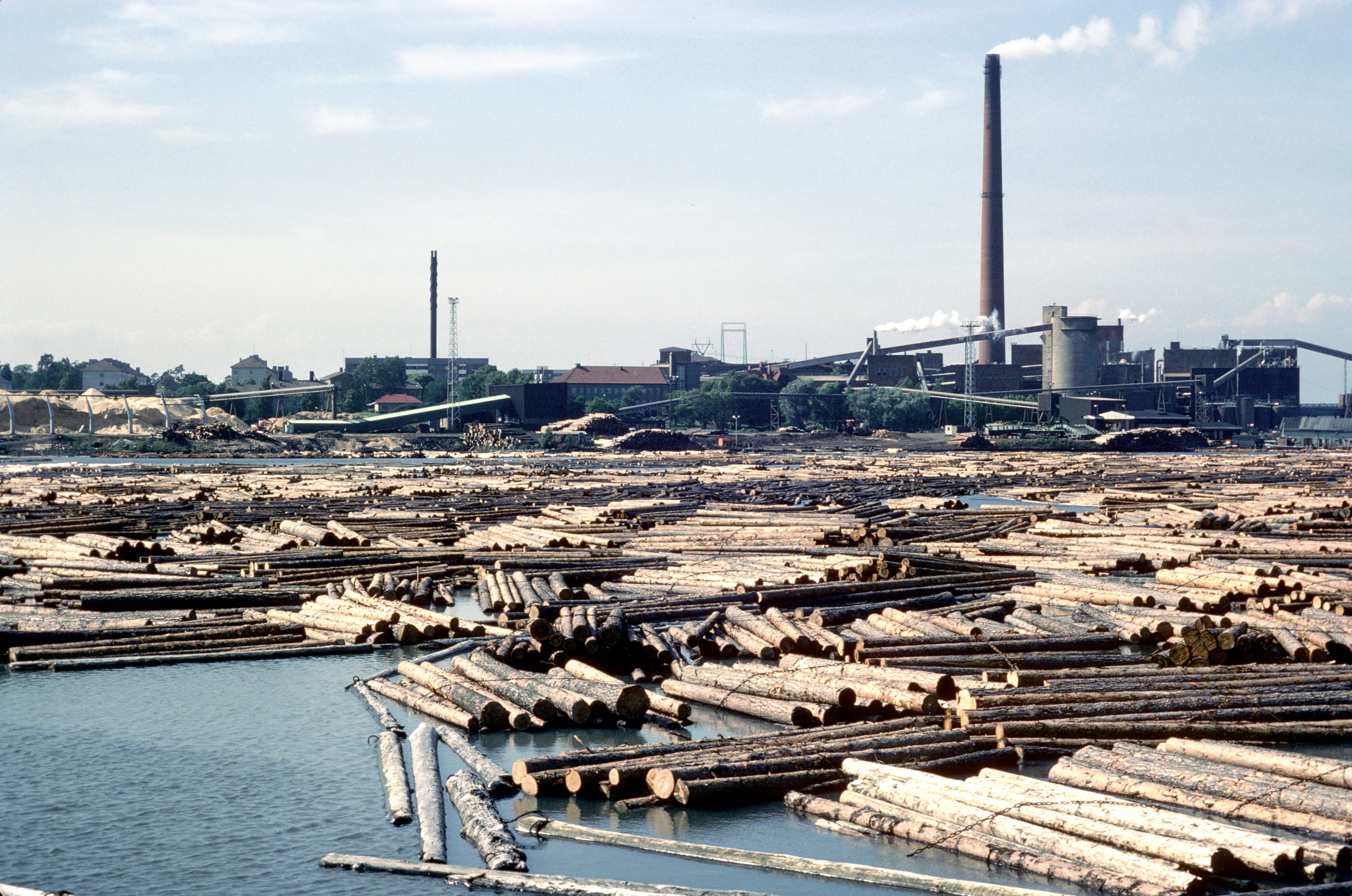
Kotka Mill in Finland

The wood industry or timber industry (sometimes lumber industry – when referring mainly to sawed boards) is the industry concerned with forestry, logging, timber trade, and the production of primary forest products and wood products (e.g. furniture) and secondary products like wood pulp for the pulp and paper industry. Some of the largest producers are also among the biggest owners of forest. The wood industry has historically been and continues to be an important sector in many economies.

== Distinction ==
In the narrow sense of the terms, wood, forest, forestry and timber/lumber industry appear to point to different sectors, in the industrialized, internationalized world, there is a tendency toward huge integrated businesses that cover the complete spectrum from silviculture and forestry in private primary or secondary forests or plantations via the logging process up to wood processing and trading and transport (e.g. timber rafting, forest railways, logging roads).

Processing and products differs especially with regard to the distinction between softwood and hardwood. While softwood primarily goes into the production of wood fuel and pulp and paper, hardwood is used mainly for furniture, floors, etc.. Both types can be of use for building and (residential) construction purposes (e.g. log houses, log cabins, timber framing).

== Production chain ==
Lumber and wood products, including timber for framing, plywood, and woodworking, are created in the wood industry from the trunks and branches of trees through several processes, commencing with the selection of appropriate logging sites and concluding with the milling and treatment processes of the harvested material. In order to determine which logging sites and milling sites are responsibly producing environmental, social and economic benefits, they must be certified under the Forest Stewardship Council Forests For All Forever (FSC) Certification that ensures these qualities.

=== Harvesting ===
Mature trees are harvested from both plantations and native forests. Trees harvested at a younger age produce smaller logs, and these can be turned into lower-value products. Factors such as location, climate conditions, species, growth rate, and silviculture can affect the size of a mature tree.

=== Timber mills ===
The native hardwood saw-milling industry originally consisted of small family-owned mills, but has recently changed to include a small number of larger mills. Mills produce large volumes of material and aim to ensure delivery of a high quality standard of product. Their goal is to do this efficiently and safely, at low cost, with rapid production time and high output.

=== Production and use ===
Once the timber has been manipulated in the required fashion, it can be shipped out for usage. There are many different purposes for wood including plywood, veneer, pulp, paper, particleboard, pallets, craft items, toys, instrument-making, furniture production, packing cases, wine barrels, cardboard, firewood, garden mulch, fibre adhesives, packaging and pet litter. Western Australia has a unique substance called ‘biochar’, which is made from jarrah and pine and sometimes from crop and forestry residues, along with the former materials. Biochar can be used to manufacture silicone and as a soil additive.

Softwoods, such as the Australian eucalyptus, are highly valued, and are used mainly for construction, paper making, and cladding. The term 'round wood' describes all the wood removed from forests in log form and used for purposes other than fuel. Wood manufacturing residues, such as sawdust and chippings, are collectively known as "pulp". The United States industrial production index hit a 13-year high during the COVID-19 pandemic, according to a report from the Board of Governors of the Federal Reserve System.

=== Transport ===
Originally, trees were felled from native forests using axes and hand-held cross-cut saws – a slow process involving significant manual labor. Since sawmills were traditionally located within forests, milled timber had to be transported over long distances via rough terrain or waterways to reach its destination. Logs were later transported via train and tram lines, first by steam-powered log haulers then by steam-powered locomotives, and finally diesel and petrol-powered locomotives. Even in the modern era, timber is dried in kilns. When the first steam railway in Australia opened in Melbourne in 1854, timber transportation changed dramatically. Trains made the transportation of lumber quicker and more affordable, making it possible for the Australian sawmill industry to move inland.

Wood is transported by a variety of methods, typically by road vehicle and log driving over shorter distances. For longer journeys, wood is transported by sea on timber carriers, subject to the IMO TDC Code.

== Top producers ==
The main industrial roundwood producers are all countries with a large forest area and a well established logging industry. In the case of coniferous industrial roundwood, the top producers in 2023 were the United States of America, with a production of 274 million m^{3} (26% of the total production), followed by the Russian Federation with 142 million m^{3} (13%) and Canada with 105 million m^{3} (10%). China led the production of non-coniferous industrial roundwood in 2023, with 141 million m^{3} (17% of the global production), followed by Brazil (138 million m^{3}, 16%) and Indonesia (74 million m^{3}, 9%).

As of 2019, the top timberland owners in the US were structured as real-estate investment trusts and include:

- Weyerhaeuser Co.
- Rayonier
- PotlatchDeltic

In 2008 the largest lumber and wood producers in the US were

- Boise Cascade
- North Pacific Group
- Sierra Pacific Industries

As these companies are often publicly traded, their ultimate owners are a diversified group of investors. There are also timber-oriented real-estate investment trusts.

According to sawmilldatabase, the world top producers of sawn wood in 2007 were:

Company	Production or Capacity in m^{3}/yr
West Fraser Timber Co Ltd	8,460,000
Canfor	6,900,000
Weyerhaeuser	6,449,000
Stora Enso	4,646,000
Georgia Pacific	4,300,000
Resolute Forest Products	3,760,000
Interfor	3,550,000
Sierra Pacific Industries	3,200,000
Hampton Affiliates	3,100,000
Arauco	2,800,000
Tolko Industries Ltd	2,500,000
Pfeifer Group	2,200,000

== Issues ==
=== Safety ===
==== Noise ====
Workers within the forestry and logging industry sub-sector fall within the agriculture, forestry, fishing, and hunting (AFFH) industry sector as characterized by the North American Industry Classification System (NAICS). The National Institute for Occupational Safety and Health (NIOSH) has taken a closer look at the AFFH industry's noise exposures and prevalence of hearing loss. While the overall industry sector had a prevalence of hearing loss lower than the overall prevalence of noise-exposed industries (15% v. 19%), workers within forestry and logging exceeded 21%. Thirty-six percent of workers within forest nurseries and gathering of forest products, a sub-sector within forestry and logging, experienced hearing loss, the most of any AFFH sub-sector. Workers within forest nurseries and gathering of forest products are tasked with growing trees for reforestation and gathering products such as rhizomes and barks. Comparatively, non-noise-exposed workers have only a 7% prevalence of hearing loss.

Worker noise exposures in the forestry and logging industry have been found to be up to 102 dBA. NIOSH recommends that a worker have an 8-hour time-weighted average of noise exposure of 85 dBA. Excessive noise puts workers at an increased risk of developing hearing loss. If a worker were to develop a hearing loss as a result of occupational noise exposures, it would be classified as occupational hearing loss. Noise exposures within the forestry and logging industry can be reduced by enclosing engines and heavy equipment, installing mufflers and silencers, and performing routine maintenance on equipment. Noise exposures can also be reduced through the hierarchy of hazard controls where removal or replacement of noisy equipment serves as the best method of noise reduction.

==== Injury ====
The Bureau of Labor Statistics (BLS) has found that fatalities of forestry and logging workers have increased from 2013 to 2016, up from 81 to 106 per year. In 2016, there were 3.6 cases of injury and illness per 100 workers within this industry.

=== Illegal logging ===
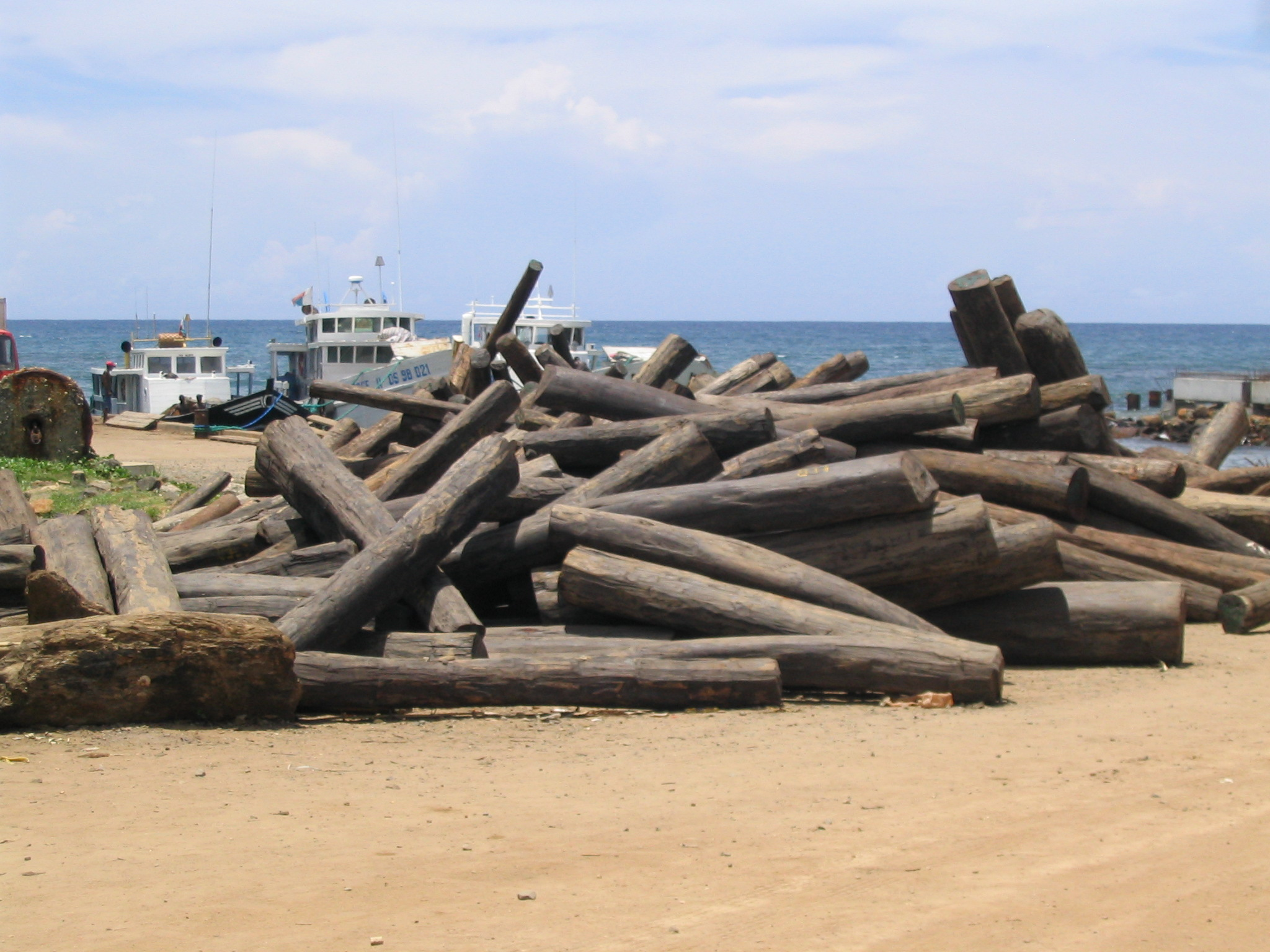
Stockpile and export of rosewood from illegal logging in Madagascar

Illegal logging is the harvest, transportation, purchase, or sale of timber in violation of laws. The harvesting procedure itself may be illegal, including using corrupt means to gain access to forests; extraction without permission, or from a protected area; the cutting down of protected species; or the extraction of timber in excess of agreed limits. Illegal logging is a driving force for a number of environmental issues such as deforestation, soil erosion and biodiversity loss which can drive larger-scale environmental crises such as climate change and other forms of environmental degradation.

Illegality may also occur during transport, such as illegal processing and export (through fraudulent declaration to customs); the avoidance of taxes and other charges, and fraudulent certification. These acts are often referred to as "wood laundering".

Illegal logging is driven by a number of economic forces, such as demand for raw materials, land grabbing and demand for pasture for cattle. Regulation and prevention can happen at both the supply side, with better enforcement of environmental protections, and at the demand side, such as an increasing regulation of trade as part of the international lumber industry.

The term 'timber theft' is an alternate name for illegal logging, especially logging done on a smaller scale and without the landowner's permission.

== Economy ==
The existence of a wood economy, or more broadly, a forest economy (in many countries a bamboo economy predominates), is a prominent matter in many developing countries as well as in many other nations with a temperate climate and especially in those with low temperatures. These are generally the countries with greater forested areas so conditions allow for development of local forestry to harvest wood for local uses. The uses of wood in furniture, buildings, bridges, and as a source of energy are widely known. Additionally, wood from trees and bushes, can be used in a variety of products, such as wood pulp, cellulose in paper, celluloid in early photographic film, cellophane, and rayon (a substitute for silk).

At the end of their normal usage, wood products can be burnt to obtain thermal energy or can be used as a fertilizer. The potential environmental damage that a wood economy could occasion include a reduction of biodiversity due to monoculture forestry (the intensive cultivation of very few trees types); and CO_{2} emissions. However, forests can aid in the reduction of atmospheric carbon dioxide and thus limit climate change.

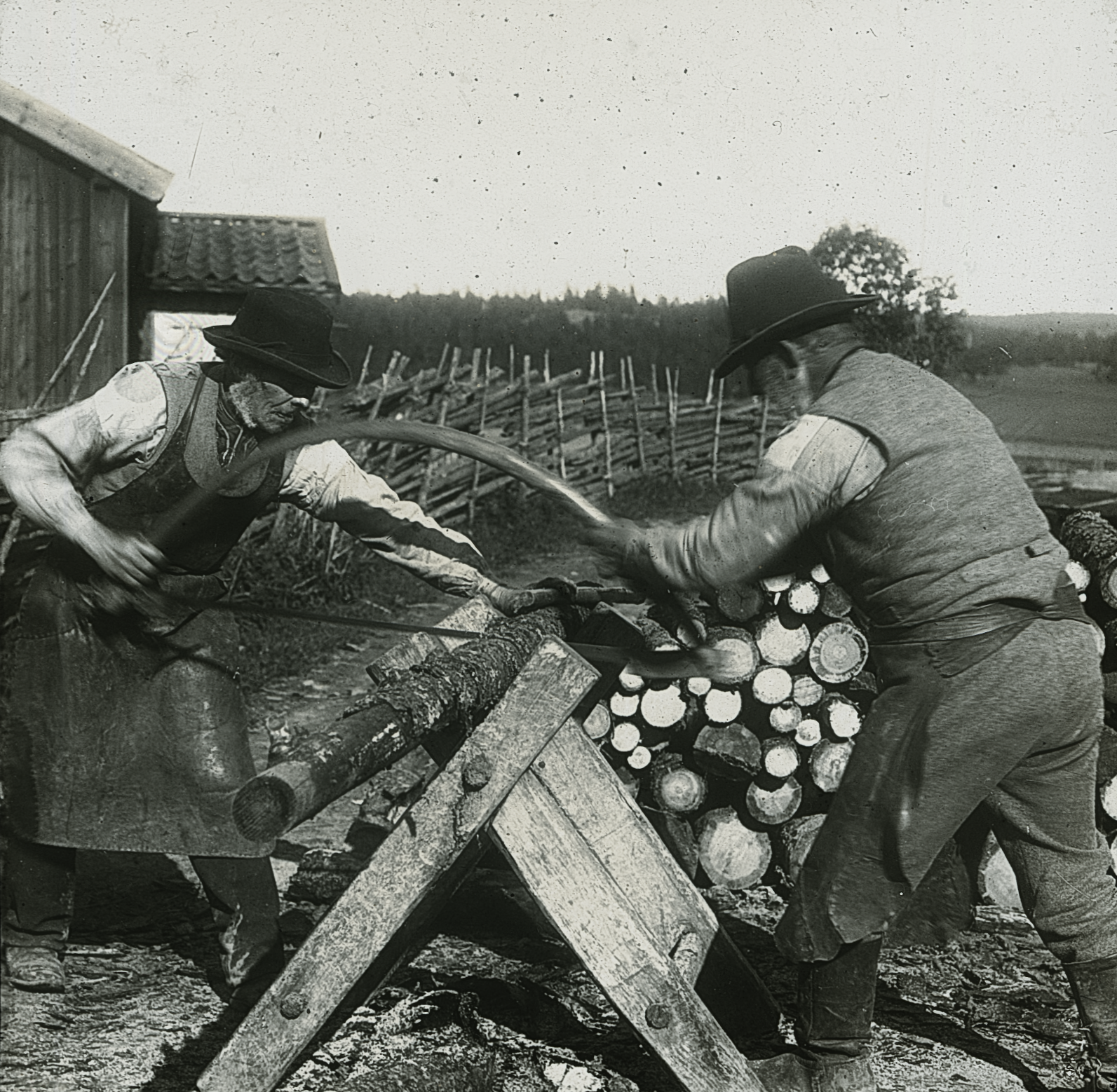
The wood industry relied heavily on hard and at times dangerous manual labor for centuries. Two Swedish workers sawing a trunk in 1905.

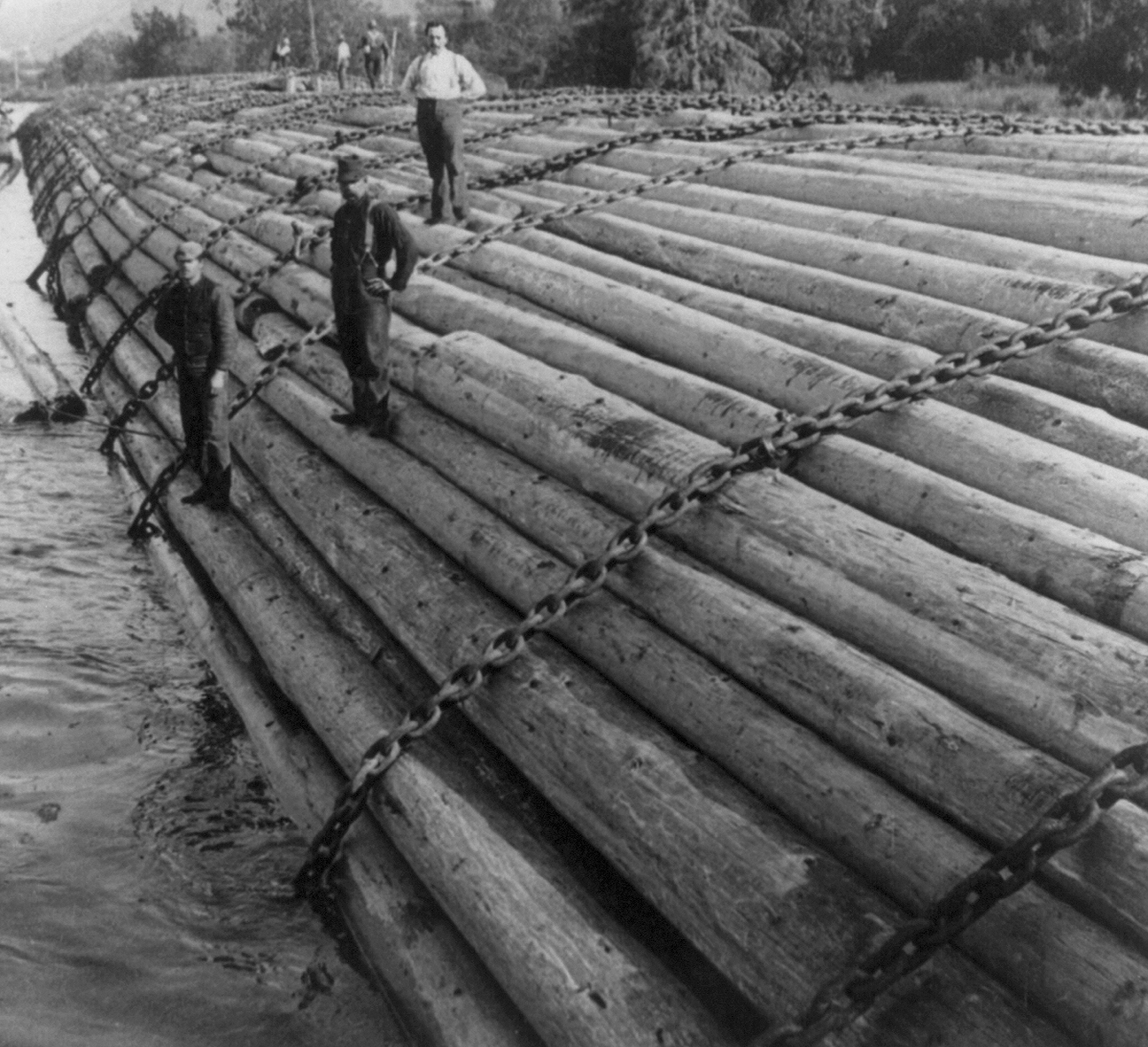
A massive log raft headed down the Columbia River in 1902, containing an entire year's worth of logs from one timber camp.

Paper is today the most used wood product.

=== History of use of wood ===
The wood economy was the starting point of the civilizations worldwide, since eras preceding the Paleolithic and the Neolithic. It necessarily preceded ages of metals by many millennia, as the melting of metals was possible only through the discovery of techniques to light fire (usually obtained by the scraping of two very dry wooden rods) and the building of many simple machines and rudimentary tools, as canes, club handles, bows, arrows, lances. One of the most ancient handmade articles ever found is a polished wooden spear tip (Clacton Spear) 250,000 years old (third interglacial period), that was buried under sediments in England, at Clacton-on-Sea.

=== Dimensions and geography ===
The main source of the lumber used in the world is forests, which can be classified as virgin, semivirgin and plantations. Much timber is removed for firewood by local populations in many countries, especially in the third world, but this amount can only be estimated, with wide margins of uncertainty.

In 1998, the worldwide production of "Roundwood" (officially counted wood not used as firewood), was about 1,500,000,000 cubic metres (2.0×10^{9} cu yd), amounting to around 45% of the wood cultivated in the world. Cut logs and branches destined to become elements for building construction accounted for approximately 55% of the world's industrial wood production. 25% became wood pulp (including wood powder and broccoli) mainly destined for the production of paper and paperboard, and approximately 20% became panels in plywood and valuable wood for furniture and objects of common use (FAO 1998).

By 2001 the rainforest areas of Brazil were reduced by a fifth (respect of 1970), to around 4,000,000 km^{2}; the ground cleared was mainly destined for cattle pasture—Brazil is the world's largest exporter of beef with almost 200,000,000 head of cattle. The booming Brazilian ethanol economy based upon sugar cane cultivation, is likewise reducing forests area. Canadian forest was reduced by almost 30% to 3,101,340 km^{2} over the same period.

=== Importance in limiting climate change ===
Regarding the problem of climate change, it is known that burning forests increase CO_{2} in the atmosphere, while intact virgin forest or plantations act as sinks for CO_{2}, for these reasons wood economy fights greenhouse effect. The amount of CO_{2} absorbed depends on the type of trees, lands and the climate of the place where trees naturally grow or are planted. Moreover, by night plants do not photosynthesize, and produce CO_{2}, eliminated the successive day. Paradoxically in summer oxygen created by photosynthesis in forests near to cities and urban parks, interacts with urban air pollution (from cars, etc.) and is transformed by solar beams in ozone (molecule of three oxygen atoms), that while in high atmosphere constitutes a filter against ultraviolet beams, in the low atmosphere is a pollutant, able to provoke respiratory disturbances.

In a low-carbon economy, forestry operations will be focused on low-impact practices and regrowth. Forest managers will make sure that they do not disturb soil-based carbon reserves too much. Specialized tree farms will be the main source of material for many products. Quick maturing tree varieties will be grown on short rotations to maximize output.

== Production by country ==
=== In Brazil ===
Brazil has a long tradition in the harvesting of several types of trees with specific uses. Since the 1960s, imported species of pine tree and eucalyptus have been grown mostly for the plywood and paper pulp industries. Currently high-level research is being conducted, to apply the enzymes of sugar cane fermentation to cellulose in wood, to obtain methanol, but the cost is much higher when compared with ethanol derived from corn costs.

- Brazilwood: has a dense, orange-red heartwood that takes a high red shine (brasa=ember), and it is the premier wood used for making bows for string instruments from the violin family. These trees soon became the biggest source of red dye, and they were such a large part of the economy and export of that country, that slowly it was known as Brazil.

=== In Canada and the US ===
There is a close relation in the forestry economy between these countries; they have many tree genera in common, and Canada is the main producer of wood and wooden items destined to the US, the biggest consumer of wood and its byproducts in the world. The water systems of the Great Lakes, Erie Canal, Hudson River and Saint Lawrence Seaway to the east coast and the Mississippi River to the central plains and Louisiana allows transportation of logs at very low costs. On the west coast, the basin of the Columbia River has plenty of forests with excellent timber.

==== Canada ====
The agency Canada Wood Council calculates that in the year 2005 in Canada, the forest sector employed 930,000 workers (1 job in every 17), making around $108 billion of value in goods and services. For many years products derived from trees in Canadian forests had been the most important export items of the country. In 2011, exports around the world totaled some $64.3 billion – the single largest contributor to Canadian trade balance.

Canada is the world leader in sustainable forest management practices. Only 120,000,000 hectares (1,200,000 km^{2}; 463,320 sq mi) (28% of Canadian forests) are currently managed for timber production while an estimated 32,000,000 hectares (320,000 km^{2}; 123,550 sq mi) are protected from harvesting by the current legislation.

The Canadian timber industry has led to environmental conflict with Indigenous people protecting their land from logging. For example, the Asubpeeschoseewagong First Nation set up the Grassy Narrows road blockade for twenty years beginning in 2002 to prevent clearcutting of their land.

==== United States ====
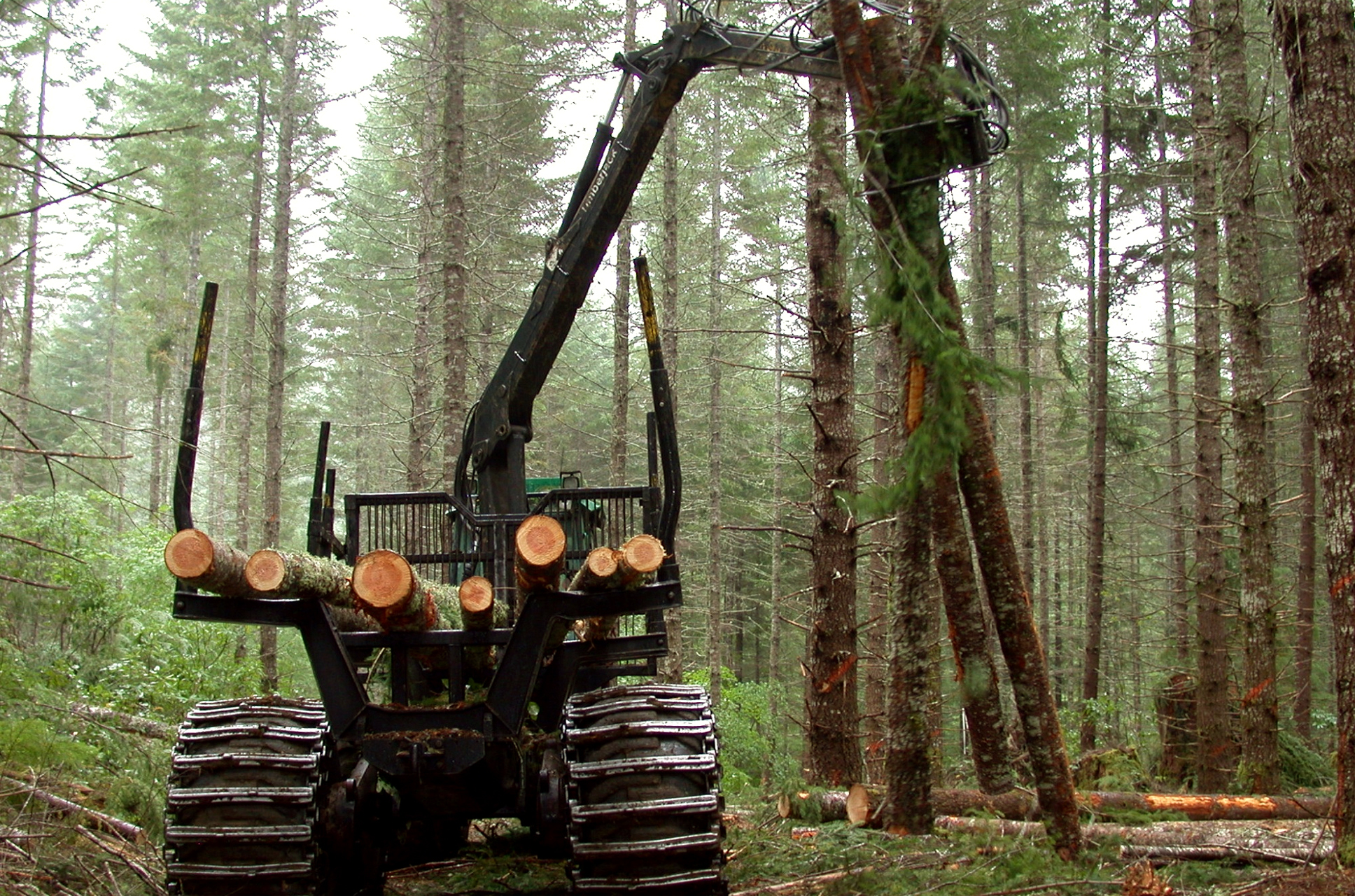
Logging in Oregon

- Cherry: a hardwood prized for its high quality in grain, width, color, and rich warm glow. The first trees were carried to the lands surrounding Rome (Latium) from Armenia. In the United States, most cherry trees are grown in Washington, Pennsylvania, West Virginia, California and Oregon.
- Cedar: this genus is a group of conifers of the family Pinaceae, originating from high mountain areas from the Carpathians, Lebanon and Turkey to the Himalayas. Their scented wood make them suitable for chests and closet lining. Cedar oil and wood is known to be a natural repellent to moths. Actually are planted in western and southern US, mostly for ornamental purposes, but also for the production of pencils (specially incense-cedar).
- Douglas fir: a native tree of the United States west coast and Mountain States, with records in fast growth and high statures in brief time. The coast Douglas fir grows in coastal regions up to altitudes of about 1,800 meters; the Rocky Mountain Douglas fir grows farther inland, at altitudes ranging from 800 m to 3,000 m or higher. The wood is used for construction, for homebuilt aircraft, for paper pulp, and also as firewood.
- Hybrid poplar is being investigated by Oak Ridge National Laboratory in Tennessee for genetic engineering to obtain a tree with a higher content of cellulose and a lower content in lignin, in such a way that the extraction of bioethanol (useful as a fuel) could be easier and less expensive.
- Walnut: a prized furniture and carving hardwood because of its colour, hardness, grain and durability. Walnut wood has been the timber of choice for gun makers for centuries. It remains one of the most popular choices for rifle and shotgun stocks.

=== Nigeria ===
Wood obtained from Nigeria's wood industry undergoes processing in various wood processing sectors, including furniture manufacturing, sawmill operations, plywood mills, pulp and paper facilities, and particleboard mills. As of 2010, workers are typically not given any safety training.

=== In the Caribbean and Central America ===
- Mahogany: has a straight grain, usually free of voids and pockets. The most prized species come from Cuba and Honduras. It has a reddish-brown color, which darkens over time, and displays a beautiful reddish sheen when polished. It has excellent workability, is available in big boards, and is very durable. Mahogany is used in the making of many musical instruments, as drums, acoustic and electric guitars' back and side, and luxury headphones.

=== In Europe ===
==== Italy ====
Poplar: in Italy is the most important species for tree plantations, is used for several purposes as plywood manufacture, packing boxes, paper, matches, etc. It needs good quality grounds with good drainage, but can be used to protect the cultivations if disposed in windbreak lines. More than 70% of Italian poplar cultivations are located in the pianura Padana. Constantly the extension of the cultivation is being reduced, from 650 km^{2} in the 1980s to current 350 km^{2}. The yield of poplars is about 1,500 t/km^{2} of wood every year. The production from poplars is around 45–50% of the total Italian wood production.

==== Portugal ====
- Oak for cork: are trees with a slow growth, but long life, are cultivated in warm hill areas (min. temp. > −5 °C) in all the west area of Mediterranean shores. Cork is popular as a material for bulletin boards. Even if the production as stoppers for wine bottles is diminishing in favor of nylon stoppers, in the sake of energy saving granules of cork can be mixed into concrete. These composites have low thermal conductivity, low density and good energy absorption (earthquake resistant). Some of the property ranges of the composites are density (400–1500 kg/m^{3}), compressive strength (1–26 MPa) and flexural strength (0.5–4.0 MPa).

=== In Fennoscandia and Russia ===
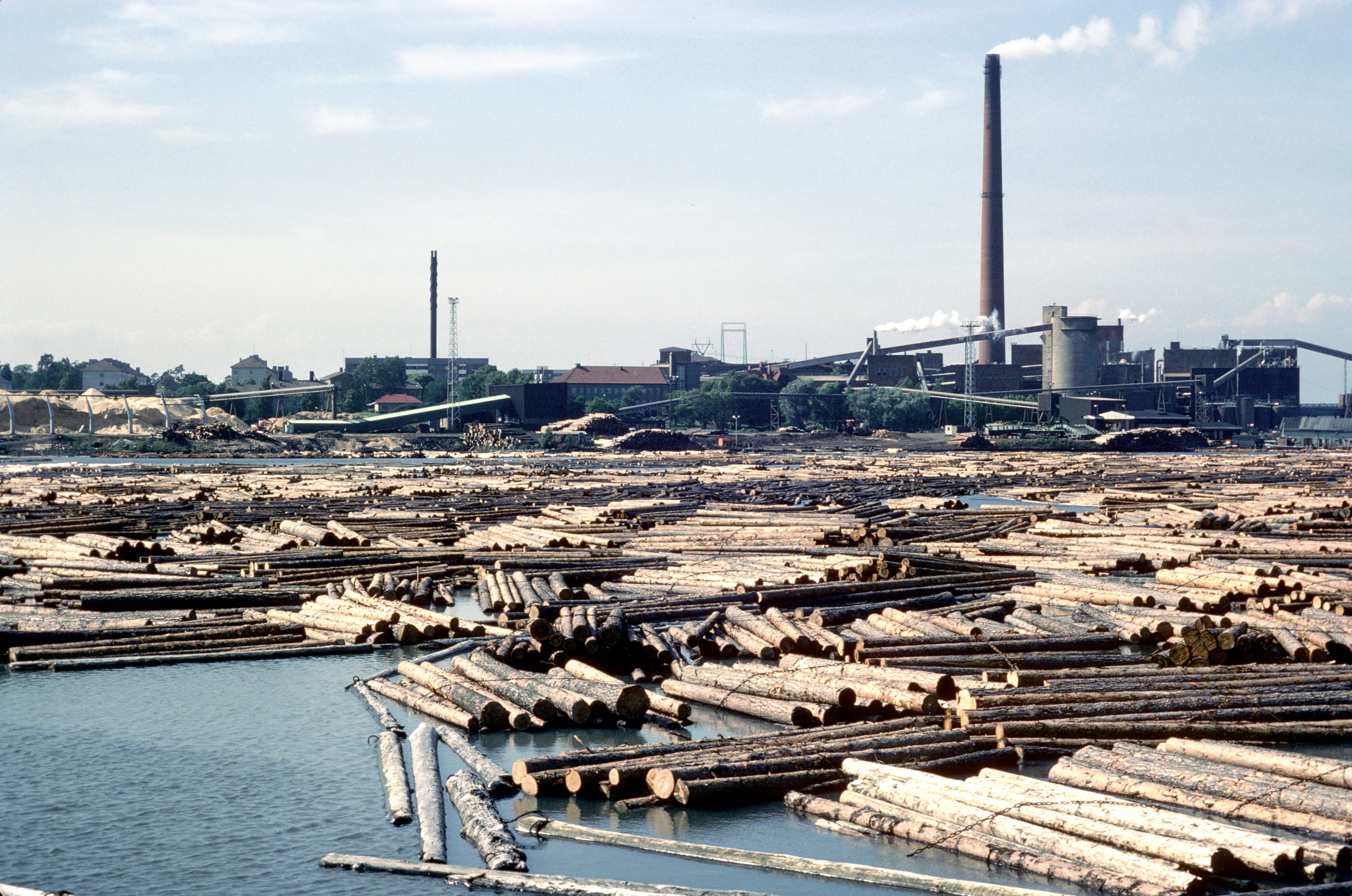
A sawmill with floating logs in Kotka, Finland

In Sweden, Finland and to an extent Norway, much of the land area is forested, and the pulp and paper industry is one of the most significant industrial sectors. Chemical pulping produces an excess of energy, since the organic matter in black liquor, mostly lignin and hemicellulose breakdown products, is burned in the recovery boiler. Thus, these countries have high proportions of renewable energy use (25% in Finland, for instance). Considerable effort is directed towards increasing the value and usage of forest products by companies and by government projects.

- Scots pine and Norway spruce: These species comprise most of the boreal forest, and together as a softwood mixture they are converted into chemical pulp for paper.
- Birch is a genus with many species of trees in Scandinavia and Russia, excellent for acid soils. These act as pioneer species in the frozen border between taiga and tundra, and are very resistant to periods of drought and icy conditions. The species Betula nana has been identified as the ideal tree for the acid, nutrient-poor soils of mountain slopes, where these trees can be used to restrain landslides, including in southern Europe. Dissolving pulp is produced from birch. Xylitol can be produced by the hydrogenation of xylose, which is a byproduct of chemical birch pulping.

== Outputs ==
A forest product is any material derived from forestry for direct consumption or commercial use, such as lumber, paper, or fodder for livestock. Wood, by far the dominant product of forests, is used for many purposes, such as wood fuel (e.g. in form of firewood or charcoal) or the finished structural materials used for the construction of buildings, or as a raw material, in the form of wood pulp, that is used in the production of paper. All other non-wood products derived from forest resources, comprising a broad variety of other forest products, are collectively described as non-timber forest products (NTFP). Non-timber forest products are viewed to have fewer negative effects on forest ecosystem when providing income sources for local community.

Production of five non-wood forest products, 2000–2022.

Globally, about 1,150,000,000 ha (2.8×10^{9} acres) of forest is managed primarily for the production of wood and non-wood forest products. In addition, 749,000,000 ha (1.85×10^{9} acres) is designated for multiple use, which often includes production.

Worldwide, the area of forest designated primarily for production has been relatively stable since 1990, but the area of multiple-use forest has decreased by about 71,000,000 ha (180,000,000 acres).

In 2023, the global export value of wood and paper products reached US$482 billion. Industrial roundwood removals amounted to 1.92 billion cubic meters. Global sawnwood production totaled 445 million cubic meters.

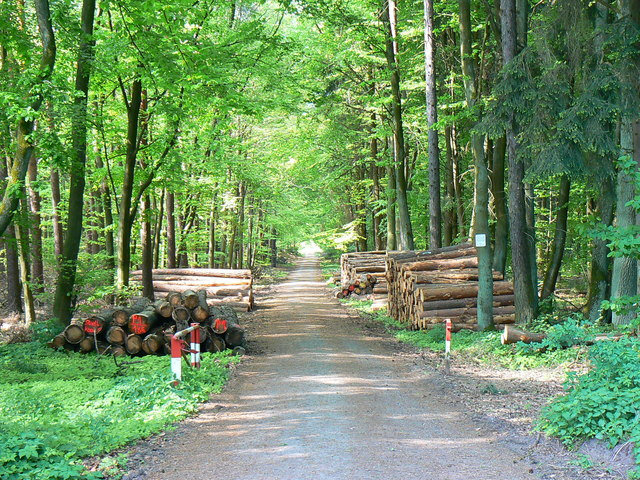
Forest Log Piles

=== Combustion ===
Combustion of wood is linked to the production of micro-environmental pollutants, as carbon dioxide (CO_{2}), carbon monoxide (CO) (an invisible gas able to provoke irreversible saturation of blood's hemoglobine), as well as nanoparticles.

==== Charcoal ====
Charcoal is the dark grey residue consisting of impure carbon obtained by removing water and other volatile constituents from animal and vegetation substances. Charcoal is usually produced by slow pyrolysis, the heating of wood or other substances in the absence of oxygen. Charcoal can then be used as a fuel with a higher combustion temperature.

==== Wood gasogen ====
Wood gas generator (gasogen): is a bulky and heavy device (but technically simple) that transforms burning wood in a mix of molecular hydrogen (H_{2}), carbon monoxide (CO), carbon dioxide (CO_{2}), molecular nitrogen (N_{2}) and water vapor (H_{2}O). This gas mixture, known as "wood gas", "poor gas" or "syngas" is obtained after the combustion of dry wood in a reductive environment (low in oxygen) with a limited amount of atmospheric air, at temperatures of 900 °C, and can fuel an internal combustion engine.

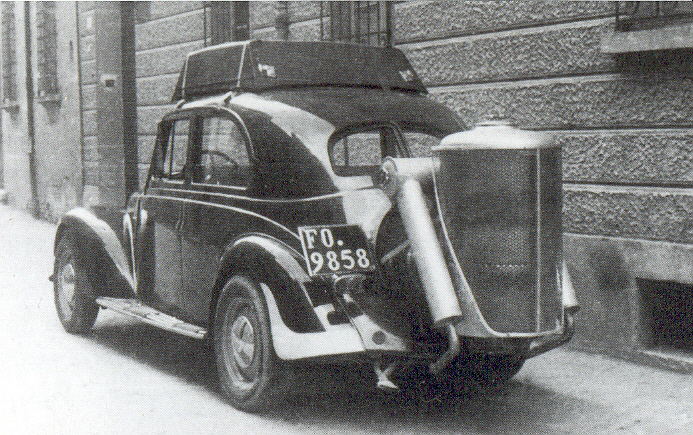
A car built in the 1940s by Ilario Bandini, with a wood gas generator device.

=== Construction ===
Wood is relatively light in weight, because its specific weight is less than 500 kg/m^{3}, this is an advantage, when compared against 2,000–2,500 kg/m^{3} for reinforced concrete or 7,800 kg/m^{3} for steel.

Wood is strong, because the efficiency of wood for structural purposes has qualities that are similar to steel.

Material	E/f	
Concrete	(Rck300, fck 25 M-Pascal)	1250
Structural steel	Fe430 (ft = 430 MPa)	480
Glued laminated timber	(BS 11 ÷ BS 18)	470
Aluminium	(alloy 7020, ft 355 MPa)	200

==== Bridges, levees, microhydro, piers ====
Wood is used to build bridges (as the Magere bridge in Amsterdam), as well as water and air mills, and microhydro generators for electricity.

==== Housing ====
Hardwood is used as a material in wooden houses, and other structures with a broad range of dimensions. In traditional homes wood is preferred for ceilings, doors, floorings and windows. Wooden frames were traditionally used for home ceilings, but they risk collapse during fires.

The development of energy efficient houses including the "passive house" has revamped the importance of wood in construction, because wood provides acoustic and thermal insulation, with much better results than concrete.

===== Earthquake resistant buildings =====
In Japan, ancient buildings, of relatively high elevation, like pagodas, historically had shown to be able to resist earthquakes of high intensity, thanks to the traditional building techniques, employing elastic joints, and to the excellent ability of wooden frames to elastically deform and absorb severe accelerations and compressive shocks.

In 2006, Italian scientists from CNR patented a building system that they called "SOFIE", a seven-storey wooden building, 24 meters high, built by the "Istituto per la valorizzazione del legno e delle specie arboree" (Ivalsa) of San Michele all'Adige. In 2007 it was tested with the hardest Japanese antiseismic test for civil structures: the simulation of Kobe's earthquake (7.2 Richter scale), with the building placed over an enormous oscillating platform belonging to the NIED-Institute, located in Tsukuba science park, near the city of Miki in Japan. This Italian project, employed very thin and flexible panels in glued laminated timber, and according to CNR researchers could lead to the construction of much more safe houses in seismic areas.

==== Shipbuilding ====
One of the most enduring materials is the lumber from virginian southern live oak and white oak, specially live oak is 60% stronger than white oak and more resistant to moisture. As an example, the main component in the structure of battle ship USS Constitution, the world's oldest commissioned naval vessel afloat (launched in 1797) is white oak.

Woodworking

Woodworking is the activity or skill of making items from wood, and includes cabinet making (cabinetry and furniture), wood carving, joinery, carpentry, and woodturning. Millions of people make a livelihood on woodworking projects.

== See also ==
- Forestry
- Lumber
- Canada–United States softwood lumber dispute
- Forest Stewardship Council
- Low-carbon economy

== Sources ==
This article incorporates text from a free content work. Licensed under CC BY 4.0 (license statement/permission). Text taken from World Food and Agriculture – Statistical Yearbook 2025, Food and Agriculture Organization of the United Nations.

== Bibliography ==
- Davis, Richard C. Encyclopedia of American forest and conservation history (1983) vol 1 online see also 2 online, 871pp. See online review of this book
- Diamond, Jared. 2005. Collapse. How Societies Choose to Fail or Succeed. New York: Viking. ISBN 0-14-303655-6.

== See also ==
- Deforestation
- Forest Products Association of Canada
- Forest Stewardship Council
- Hardwood/softwood
- Illegal logging
- Lumber industry on the Ottawa River
- National Hardwood Lumber Association
- Pulp and paper industry in the United States
