= Montana History Portal =

American historical database (1890-1978)

The Montana History Portal aims to provide open access to digital materials regarding historical and contemporary Montana. “These materials provide opportunities for education, genealogy research, business, pleasure, and lifelong learning.” MMP includes many historical materials such as books, maps, diaries, oral histories, art. Any medium is acceptable as long as it relates to Montana.

Collections include records of cattle drives, the Anaconda Mining Company, school yearbooks, newspapers, obituaries, etc. It is linked to projects such as Montana Newspapers and Women's History Matters.

This program's goal is to disseminate historical materials further than they would be able to go in a museum or library special collection, where they are often kept under lock and key for preservation purposes. Digitizing these materials allows people who cannot visit these locations to see them and conduct formal or casual research from home. These records will allow for further historical information to be distributed in an accessible manner.

== Establishment ==
The Montana Memory Project was established in 2005 when Bruce Newell, the Montana State Library commissioner, “pushed for the creation of a program to help libraries statewide collect and preserve the history and culture of their communities.” The MMP developed slowly out of this original project as logistics and technology evolved alongside interest in the project.

Jennifer Birnel became the director of the MMP in 2013, and she still holds the position today.

In 2023 the program changed its name to the Montana History Portal.

== Contributors ==
All Montana's institutions are welcome to contribute to the database, which is based in the Montana State Library and the Montana Historical Society. Individuals are not eligible to contribute, in order to ensure all sources have official, secure locations that people can visit if they choose to do so.

A few contributors include:

- Billings Public Library
- Blaine County Library
- Bozeman Public Library
- Bridger Women's Club
- Gallatin History Museum
- Glacier National Park Archives
- Lewis & Clark Library
- MSU Billings Library
- Madison Valley Public Library
- Montana Historical Society Research Center
- Montana State Library
- Montana State University Library
- Museum of the Rockies
- Yellowstone Historic Center
- Yellowstone Research Library
