= NHLA =

NHLA may be:

- National Hispanic Leadership Agenda
- National Hardwood Lumber Association
- New Hampshire Liberty Alliance
- New Hampshire Library Association, professional association for librarians in New Hampshire
