= Missoula Public Library =

Library in Missoula, Montana

The Missoula Public Library and Branches
- Missoula Public Library, main building completed 2021
- 46.869610°N 113.989710°W
- Location: Missoula, Montana, United States
- Established: 1894; 132 years ago (current: 1974)
- Branches: 6 (Lolo; Missoula Co.: Swan Valley, Frenchtown, Seeley Lake, WOW bus, Big Sky, Potomac)

Collection
- Items collected: Books, journals, newspapers, magazines, sound and music recordings, visual media, databases, genealogy, maps.
- Size: 216,327
- Legal deposit: Regional Depository Library for Montana

Access and use
- Access requirements: Montana residency
- Population served: 109,299 (2017)

Other information
- Budget: US$2.75M (2013)
- Director: Slaven Lee
- Employees: 39-55
- Website: www.missoulapubliclibrary.org
- Building details

Technical details
- Floor area: 42,241 feet (12,875.1 m)

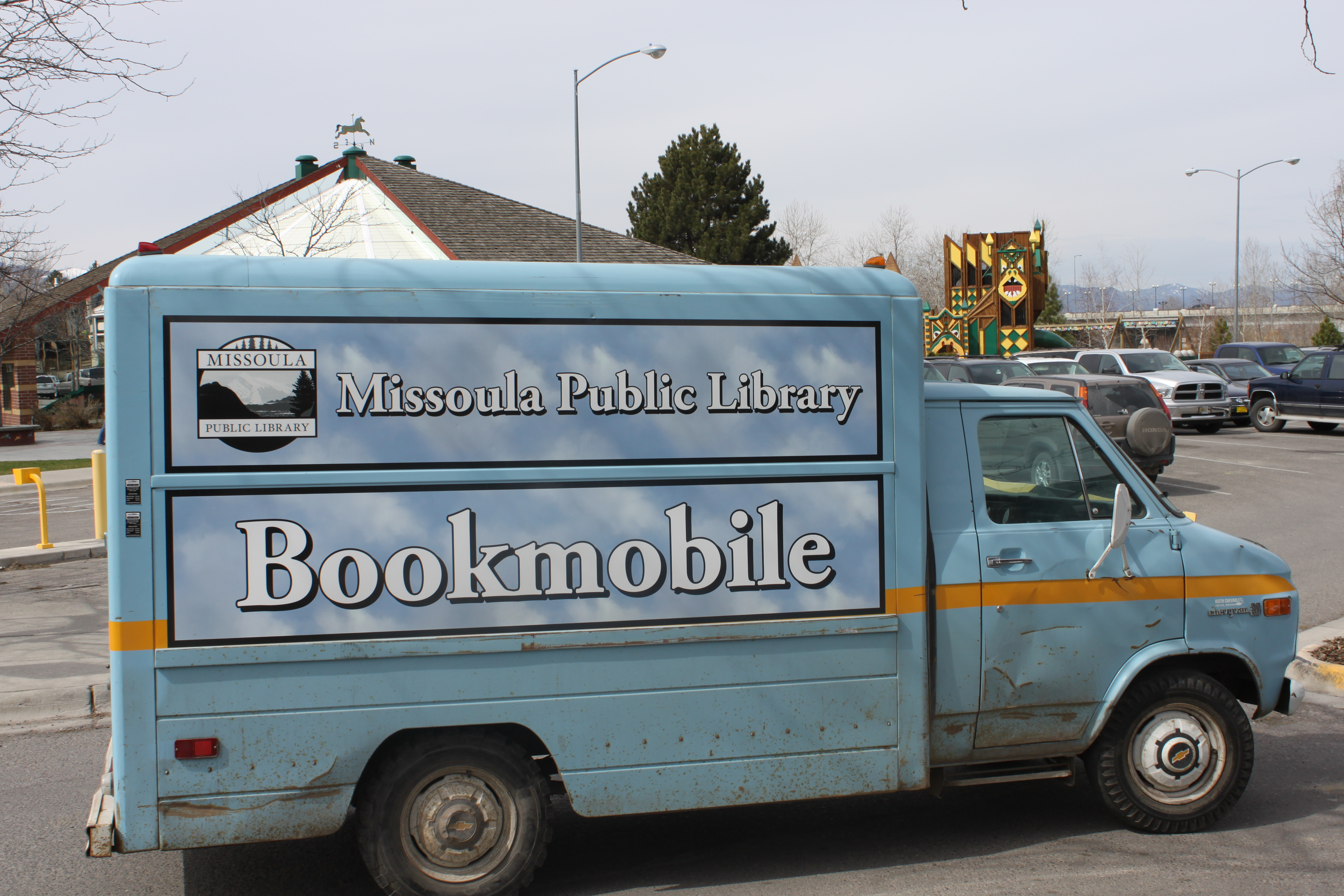
Missoula Public Library bookmobile on National Bookmobile Day, the Wednesday of National Library Week (2011)

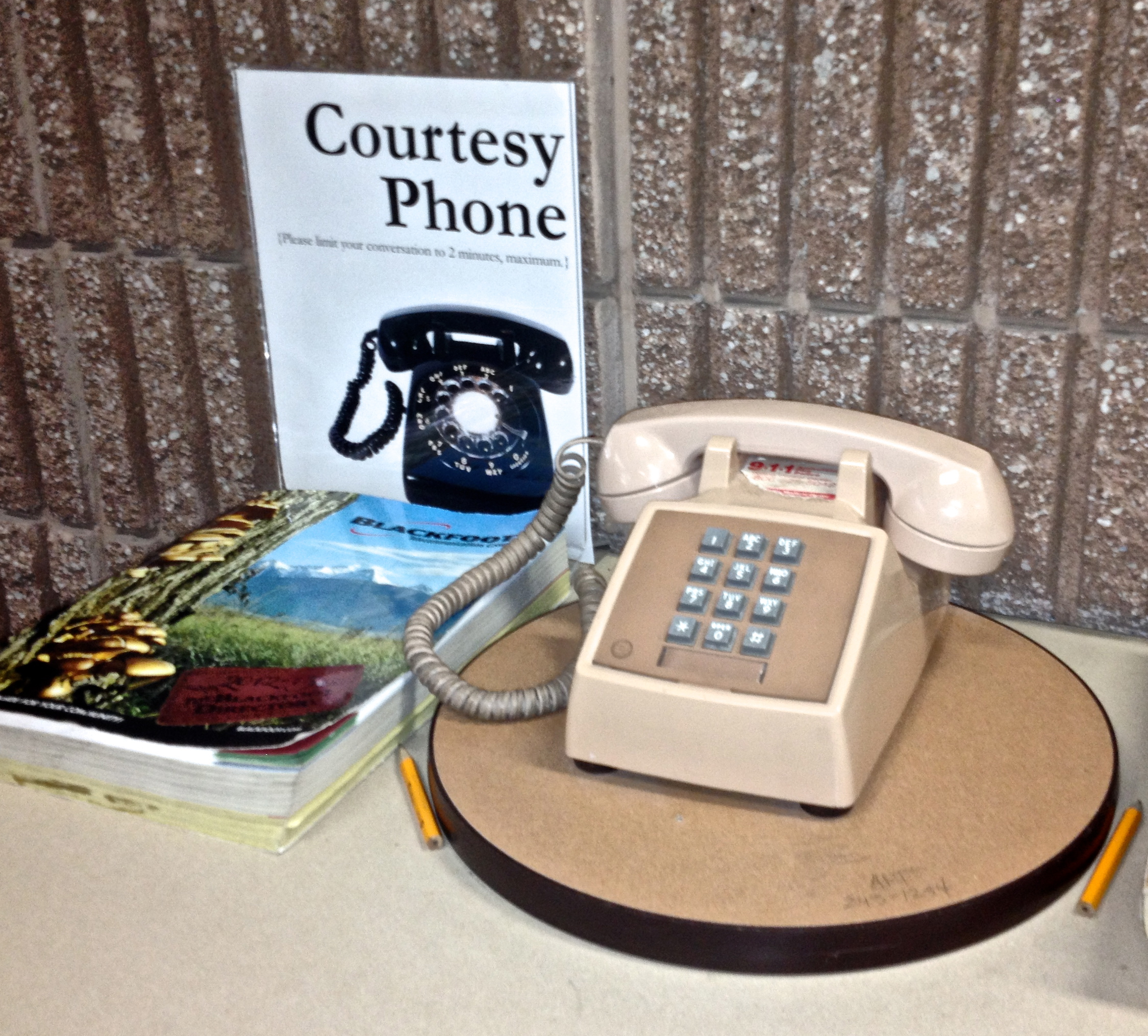
Courtesy phone, telephone book, and pencils - Missoula Public Library (2013)

The Missoula Public Library is the public library of Missoula, Montana. The library provides free resources for residents and guests of Missoula County, Montana. A library card is free, and available, to all Montana residents.

== Description ==
The Missoula Public Library opened in 1894. The Missoula Carnegie Library opened on Jan 13, 1903 on 335 N. Pattee St. and its building is now part of the Missoula Art Museum.

The main library is located at 455 E. Main St., Missoula (59802-4799). It includes a café, a shop, and Missoula Community Access Television’s (MCAT) high-tech production studio. the University of Montana Living Lab. A video of the new building's design concepts is available to view.

Six branches are located:

- Big Sky. Big Sky High School
- Frenchtown, Montana
- Lolo, Montana
- Potomac, Montana
- Seeley Lake, Montana
- Swan Lake in Condon, Montana

The library has served as a location for or been involved in community discussions.

The library provides free wireless internet access, a computer lab with over twenty stations, self-printing, two study rooms, a Makerspace, self-check out stations, self-hold pickup, and roving librarians. Their print and audio-visual collections include fiction, nonfiction, CDs, a Montana Collection in the Audra Browman Research Room, the Five Valleys Seed Library, Book Chat Bags, a Kids Readers' Corner, and a Young Adult Readers' Corner. They also check out laptops, DVD players, MonoMouses, life jackets, automotive diagnostic scanners, Ready to Read Trunks/Kids' Learning Kits, travel/trail bags, board games/puzzles, binoculars/birding backpacks, seeds, kill-a-watt meters, and telescopes. The library also has a coffee shop and public space where users can study or read with beverages or food. Other full-size libraries in Missoula include the Maureen and Mike Mansfield Library at the University of Montana.

Friends of Missoula Public Library has been active since 1969 and its current mission is to, "maintain a citizens' association devoted to libraries," to, "focus public attention on the Missoula Public Library and its branches and their needs," to, "increase their facilities and services," and to, "enrich the cultural lives of Missoula area citizens with community events and activities." The Missoula Book Fair was first held for the state centennial in 1989 and was continued because it, "increases awareness of local authors, promotes books and reading, and raises money for the Missoula Public Library."

== Awards and honors ==
The International Federation of Library Associations and Institutions (IFLA) named the Missoula Public Library as its 'Public Library of the Year' in 2022. It was also given the title of 'World's Best Library' by the World Library and Information Congress.

Librarians at the Missoula Public Library who have been given awards including being named the Sheila Cates Librarian of the Year by the Montana Library Association, as was current library director Honore Bray (2013), retired reference librarian Vaun Stevens (2009), former library director Bette Ammon (2002), and current cataloging librarian Paulette Parpart (2017).

In 2006 the Missoula Public Library, along with partner libraries Flathead County Library System, Heart Free Library, Bitterroot Public Library, Drummond School/Community Library, and Polson City Library, was awarded the Library of the Year Award by the Montana Library Association, and the Missoula Public Library was named Library of the Year in 1993.

== See also ==
- Billings Public Library
- Bozeman Public Library
- Great Falls Public Library
