= KLA =

KLA may refer to:

== Military ==
- Korean Liberation Army, created in 1940
- Kosovo Liberation Army, Kosovo-Albanian insurgent organization
- Khalistan Liberation Army, a pro-Khalistan (Sikh separatist) militant group in India

== Organizations ==
- Kansas Library Association
- Kentucky Library Association
- Kenya Lacrosse Federation, formerly the Kenya Lacrosse Association
- Kerala Library Association
- Kerala Legislative Assembly
- KLA Corporation, semiconductor equipment company

== Other ==
- Kampala Airport, Uganda - IATA code
- Klamath-Modoc language, ISO 639-3 code kla
