= Alma Smith Jacobs =

American librarian

Alma S. Jacobs
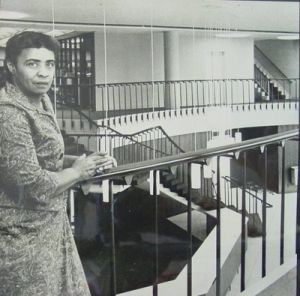
- Alma Smith Jacobs at a library c. 1960s
- Born: Alma Smith; November 21, 1916; Lewistown, Montana
- Died: December 18, 1997 (aged 81)
- Education: Talladega College, Bachelor's degree in sociology, 1938; Columbia University, Bachelor’s degree in library science, 1942
- Occupation: Librarian
- Known for: First African American to serve as Montana State Librarian

Alma Smith Jacobs (21 November 1916 – 18 December 1997) was the first African American to serve as Montana State Librarian. She served as Head Librarian at the Great Falls Public Library from 1954 to 1973, and in 1973 was named Montana State Librarian, serving until 1981.

Alma Smith was born in Lewistown, Montana, the daughter of Martin Luther and Emma Smith. She moved with her family to Great Falls, Montana, in 1923. After receiving a bachelor's degree in sociology from Talladega College in Alabama in 1938, she served as bookmobile librarian traveling throughout the south. In 1942, she received a bachelor's degree in library science from Columbia University, and became Assistant Librarian at Talladega College. In 1946, she returned to Great Falls, to serve as catalog librarian at the Great Falls Public Library. In 1954, she was promoted head librarian/director serving until 1973. She was the driving force behind the construction of the city’s modern library in 1967, and the expansion and development of the rural library service program throughout Montana. In 1973, she was selected as Montana State Librarian where she was instrumental in development of library federations in Montana. She became the first African American president of the Montana Library Association, the first African American president of the Pacific Northwest Library Association, and the first Montanan to serve on the executive board of the American Library Association. In addition to her work on behalf of libraries, Jacobs was a leader in civil rights activities throughout Montana. She served on the Great Falls Interracial Council, working to break down racial barriers within the community and for airmen at Malmstrom Air Force Base. She was active in the Montana Advisory Committee to the U.S. Civil Rights Commission and co-founded the Montana Committee for the Humanities.

She was active in the Union Bethel African Methodist Episcopal Church, served as president of the Montana Federation of Colored Women’s Clubs, and was a national board member of the United Church Women. In 1999, the Great Falls Tribune named Alma Jacobs one of the top 100 Montanans in the 20th Century, and in 2010, the Great Falls Tribune named Alma Jacobs one of the top 125 Montana Newsmakers.

In June 2009, the city of Great Falls proclaimed Alma Smith Jacobs Week, and the Great Falls Public Library dedicated a new plaza named The Alma Jacobs Memorial Plaza, citing her as "an exceptional librarian and community leader."

In 2016, she was named to the State Capitol Gallery of Outstanding Montanans.

In 2017, a mural of Alma on the side of the Great Falls Public Library, painted by Jim DeStaffany and Andrew Fowler, was dedicated.
