= Metropolitan New York Library Council =

Consortium of libraries

Metropolitan New York Library Council (METRO)
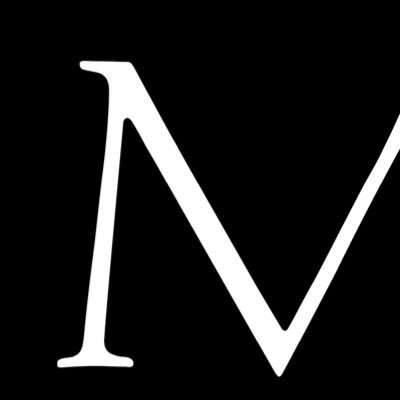

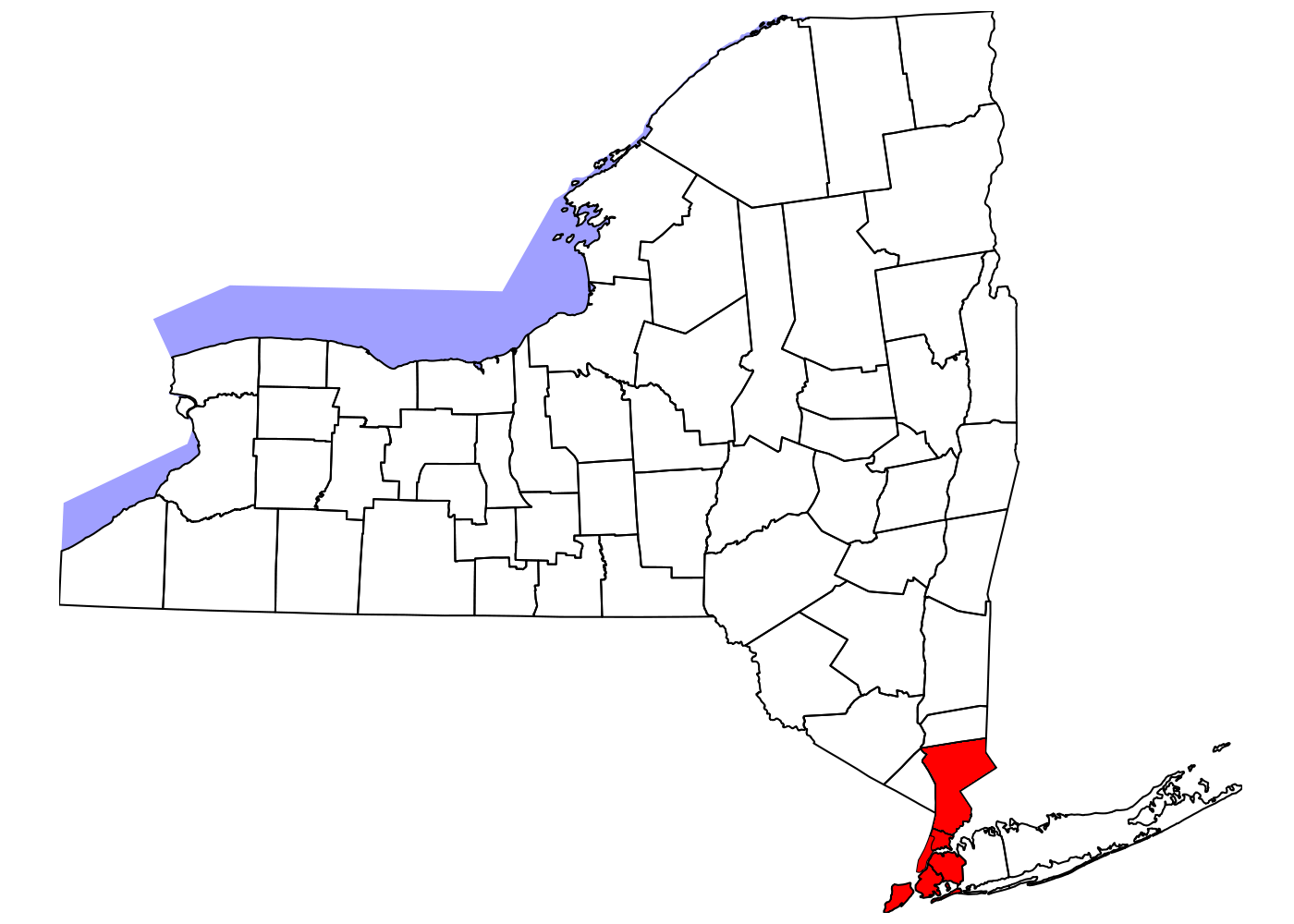
- Metropolitan New York Library Council Service Area
- Founded: 1964
- Type: Consortium
- Location: New York City
- Coordinates: 40.762733°N 73.997373°W
- Region served: New York City and Westchester County
- Product: Member Services Institution
- Key people: Nate Hill (Executive Director)
- Website: metro.org

The Metropolitan New York Library Council (METRO) is a nonprofit organization that specializes in providing research, programming, and organizational tools for libraries, archives, and museums in the New York metropolitan area. The council was founded in 1964 under the Education Law of the State of New York.

Member institutions include the Brooklyn Public Library, City University of New York Libraries, Columbia University, Memorial Sloan-Kettering Cancer Center, Mercy College, Museum of Modern Art, New York Botanical Garden, New York Public Library, New York University, Queens Public Library, Rockefeller University, Westchester Library System, Sotheby's Institute of Art, Scholastic, Inc., and UNICEF.

== Overview ==
As a membership-based organization, METRO offers archival and library training opportunities, facilitates research and local community initiatives, supports Special Interest Groups (SIGs), and provides research, programming, and organizational tools for New York libraries, archives, and museums. It is also responsible for providing funding for internships and digitization projects to member libraries. METRO digitization grants provide member libraries with the opportunity to digitize their collections, several of which are available via the Internet Archive in METRO's collection of ebooks and texts.

=== Programs and sponsored projects ===
- Digitization Grant Program
- myMETRO Researchers
- Documentary Heritage Program (DHP) The current Documentary Heritage Program is collocated on its Keeping Collections website.
- Hospital Library Services Program
- Queens Memory Project
- NYARC Documenting the Gilded Age: New York City Exhibitions at the Turn of the Century
- Wikipedia GLAM Initiative ("Galleries, Libraries, Archives, and Museums"), including a Wikipedian-in-Residence role.

== Works or publications ==
- "Hurricane Sandy: Record, Remember, Rebuild"

== See also ==
- List of Library Associations
- List of Library Associations specific to American states
