= Montana Library Association =

American state library association

Coordinates: 46.587°N 112.014°W

The Montana Library Association is the state library association of Montana. It is run by librarians from across the state.

Their mission is, "to develop, promote, and improve library and information services and the profession of librarianship in order to enhance learning and ensure access to information for all." They grant library awards including the Sheila Cates Librarian of the Year and the Montana Library of the Year at their annual conference. According to the Montana State Library, the Association, "is a statewide professional organization dedicated to supporting libraries, trustees and library staff in Montana...Throughout the year MLA hosts retreats and an annual conference where members can meet and learn more about what is happening in libraries."

It is listed in the 2016-07-13 Senate Congressional Record, as well as other lists of State Library Associations.

== See also ==
- Alma Smith Jacobs
- American Library Association
- Bozeman Public Library
- Missoula Public Library
- List of libraries in the United States
