= District of Columbia Library Association =

Professional association for librarians in the District of Columbia

- Nickname: DCLA
- Formation: June 15, 1894; 132 years ago
- Tax ID no.: 23-7225161
- Headquarters: Washington, D.C., U.S.
- Parent organization: American Library Association
- Website: dcla.org

The District of Columbia Library Association (DCLA) is a professional organization for District of Columbia's librarians and library workers. It is headquartered in Washington, D.C., was founded on June 15, 1894, as the Library Association of Washington City. DCLA's first president was Ainsworth Spofford who was also Librarian of Congress; most of DCLA's initial monthly meetings were held in the Library of Congress. It changed its name to District of Columbia Library Association in March 1901 and became a chapter of the American Library Association on June 28, 1922.

DCLA has had reciprocal member privileges for Virginia Library Association and Maryland Library Association members since 2013.

== See also ==
- List of libraries in the United States
- Columbia Civic Library Association
