= Queens Memory Project =

Media archival project on Queens, New York

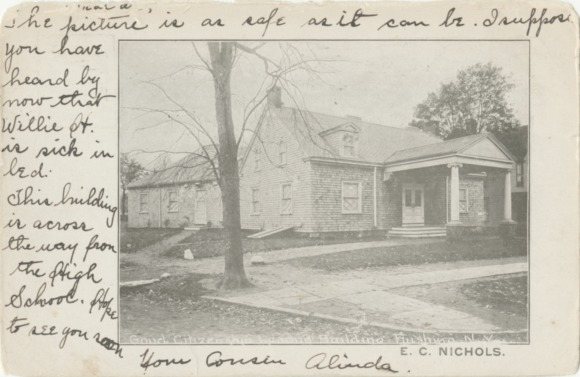
Black and white postcard of the Good Citizenship Building in Flushing in 1907

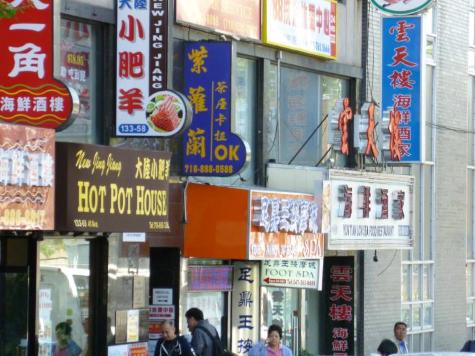
Flushing Chinatown, looking westward from Main Street at the south side of 41st Avenue in Flushing in September 2011

The Queens Memory Project is a community archiving program which aims to record and preserve contemporary history across the New York City borough of Queens. Community archives are created in response to needs defined by the members of a community, who may also exert control over how materials are used. The project is a collaborative effort between Queens College, City University of New York and Queens Public Library that was initially funded in 2010 through a grant from the Metropolitan New York Library Council (METRO). Materials in the archive are made accessible to the public through a website which contains oral history interviews and photographs documenting the lives of Queens residents. The stories and images are presented alongside digitized historical photographs, maps, news clippings and other archival records. The goal of the project is to allow visitors to the site to view otherwise scattered archival materials and personal stories in a searchable database of collective memory representing the borough of Queens.

== History ==
The archive began in June 2010 as an independent study for project director and archivist Natalie Milbrodt, then a Special Collections and Archives Fellow in the Queens College Libraries and a master's degree candidate in the Graduate School of Library and Information Studies. Focusing on the neighborhood of Flushing, Milbrodt conducted oral history interviews with 20 residents in the Waldheim neighborhood, a small area less than a mile from downtown Flushing. A grant from the Metropolitan New York Library Council (METRO) enabled her to establish collaboration with Queens Public Library to combine archival materials from their holdings relevant to Queens history with those of Queens College. The website for the Queens Memory Project was later developed by software firm Whirl-i-Gig and officially launched to the public on October 27, 2011. The site combines digital audio of the project interviews with images and other digital content from the collections. Development of the Queens Memory Project since 2011 has focused on expanded documentation across the borough of Queens, collaboration with educators, scholars, artists, and community groups. Future development will incorporate Web 2.0 technology to allow direct user contributions.

== Training ==
The Queens Memory team offers weekly trainings for new volunteers and those interested in conducting oral history interviews. These trainings are free and intended to empower Queens residents to create high quality additions to local history collections at Queens Public Library.

== Oral histories ==
The collection contains over 500 individual oral history interviews from residents of Queens. Nearly all of these interviews were conducted by volunteers who received training from Queens Memory Project staff working at Queens Public Library or Queens College CUNY. Many of these interviews are available online with transcriptions.

== Podcast ==
The Queens Memory Project has produced a journalistic podcast since 2019 that often features the voices of Queens residents. Its first season covered the state of immigrants in Queens. Its second season is focused on life in Queens during COVID-19 and won a Third Coast International Audio Festival award. Its third season is titled "Our Major Minor Voices" and is composed of bilingual episodes featuring the real voices of Asian Americans in Queens.

== Wild Sound recordings ==
Wild Sound recordings are audio recordings that document events and public places in Queens. The recordings are in digital WAV format.

== Photographs ==
Digital photographs donated by Queens residents are included in the project's collections. Digital images are stored in TIFF format.

== Ephemera ==
Other items in the Queens Memory Project archive include digitized maps, news clippings, and other ephemera. Digital images are stored in TIFF format.
