= Bozeman Public Library =

Coordinates: 45.679°N 111.027°W

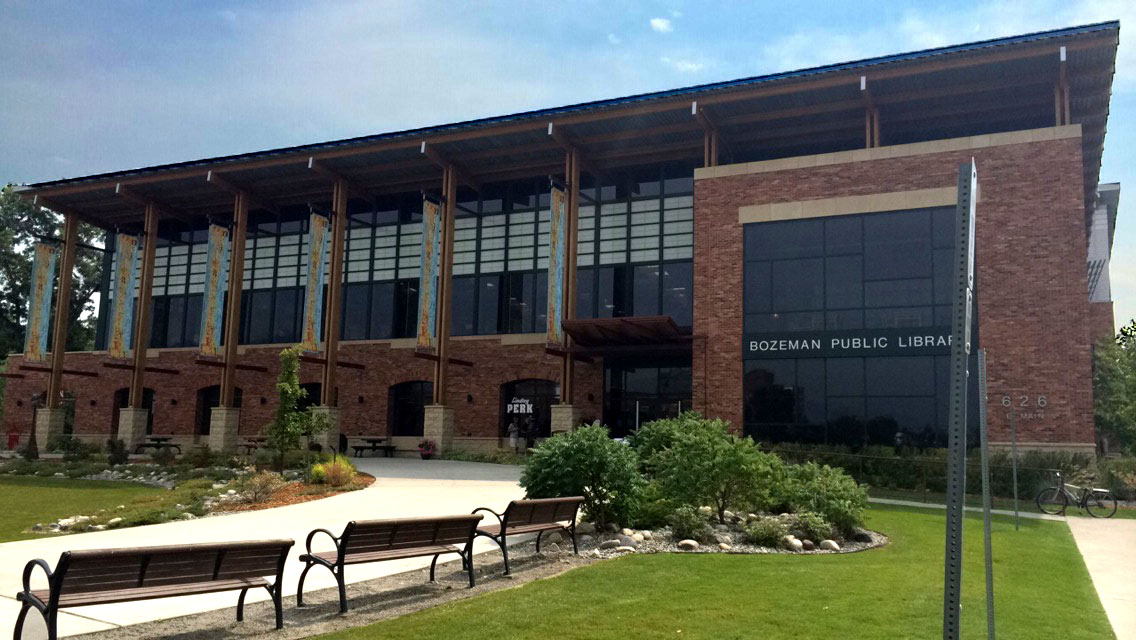

The Bozeman Public Library is the public library of Bozeman, Montana. The library provides free resources for residents of Gallatin County, Montana.

== Description ==
There were several small libraries serving Bozeman beginning with the Young Men's Library Association in 1872, which was housed above a drug store on East Main Street. A tax-supported city library opened in 1891 on the second floor of the City Hall and Opera House. In 1903-1904, the Bozeman Carnegie Library was built on North Bozeman Avenue, also downtown. That building served as a library until 1980, when a new building was constructed several blocks away on East Lamme Street. This building was then renovated for use as one of the several city government office buildings in Bozeman. The current building on East Main Street was made possible after taxpayers passed a four million dollar bond referendum in 2001. With this funding, 14.3 acres that had belonged to the Milwaukee Railroad ("Milwaukee Road") was purchased, and construction began in April 2005. The current site of the library is the former location of the old Bozeman "Milwaukee Road" passenger and partial freight terminal. This railroad was electrified (3,000 volts DC) from Harlowton, Montana, through Butte, Missoula, and Spokane, to Seattle-Tacoma; and so, it is fitting that the current library is notably eco-friendly.

The new building of the Bozeman Public Library was opened in November, 2006 and is well-known locally, nationally, and internationally for its use of "green" architecture. It has 53,000 square feet of space and is the first public building in Montana to have Leadership in Energy and Environmental Design (LEED) silver level certification. Some of the "green" architectural features include the use of natural light, reduced waste in construction, and the use of local building materials. Views from the windows of the building include the local Bridger Mountain Range. The library offers a full range of services including computer access, an extensive newspaper and periodical section, a young reader area, and comfortable reading chairs and work tables. The library is one of several full-size libraries in the Gallatin Valley, which also include the Montana State University Renne Library, Montana State University Art Library, and Montana State University Educational Resources Library.

== Awards and honors ==
In 2003, the Institute of Museum and Library Services honored the Bozeman Public Library with the National Award for Library Service.

== See also ==
- Missoula Public Library
- Montana Library Association
