= Columbia Civic Library Association =

Professional association for Black librarians in Washington DC

The Columbia Civic Library Association was a professional organization for Black librarians and library workers in Washington DC, known for compiling and publishing A Directory of Negro Graduates of Accredited Library Schools (1900-1936). The organization was based at Howard University. Margaret Hunton, one of the first Black librarians hired at the Library of Congress, was president of the organization in 1940.

== See also ==
- List of libraries in the United States
