= MonoMouse =

Handheld electronic magnifier

MonoMouse is a handheld electronic magnifier manufactured by Bierley, designed to help people with a visual impairment to read printed text or images.

Originally developed by Ian Bierley in 2003 for use by his mother, who had glaucoma, and then later released as a commercial product supplied through opticians in 2005. The MonoMouse is shaped like an oversized computer mouse and connects to any television through either the SCART connector in Europe or the RCA connector in the rest of the world.

It is an example of assistive technology to enable people with eye conditions like macular degeneration to read printed text and see printed images.
