= Arizona Library Association =

Professional organization

- Nickname: AzLA
- Formation: November 12, 1926; 99 years ago
- Founder: Estelle Lutrell, Con Cronin
- Founded at: Phoenix, Arizona
- Tax ID no.: 86-6052350
- Parent organization: American Library Association
- Website: www.azla.org

The Arizona Library Association (AzLA) is a professional organization for Arizona's librarians and library workers. It is headquartered in Tucson. It was founded on November 12, 1926, in Phoenix, by Estelle Lutrell and State Librarian Con Cronin. Cronin was elected as the organization's first president. Lutrell was a secretary of AzLA from 1926–1930 and elected president in 1931.

AzLA has developed statewide materials purchasing contracts, provides continuing education credits for school librarians, and creates regional forums for obtaining statewide input to the association. AzLA is a sponsor the Horner Fellowship (est. 1989) and the Snowbird Leadership Institute, for younger librarians. AzLA publishes the AzLA Newsletter (ISSN 0515-0272).

== Arizona Library Association (AzLA) Logo Designs ==
In 2024, the Arizona Library Association (AZLA) introduced the idea of creating a conference logo that would reflect the theme of each year’s conference. The first commissioned logo was created for the 2024 theme, “Rising to the Challenge.” The design was created by artist Jeffrey Stoffer and features a mountain range made of books with a Phoenix rising into the sky, symbolizing resilience and growth within the library community.

The following year, AzLA continued the tradition by commissioning a new artist. Dallas Parke, a graphic designer and student of Library and Information Science (MLIS) at the University of Arizona, was selected to create the 2025 conference logo. The 2025 theme, “Arizona Blooming,” inspired a design that reflects renewal and the continued development of Arizona’s library community. The logo debuted at the 2025 AZLA Conference, held October 22 – 24, 2025, at Casino Del Sol in Tucson, Arizona.

Following the positive reception of the 2025 design, Parke was commissioned to create the official logo for the association’s 100th anniversary. The centennial logo, developed for the 2026 AZLA Conference, is featured on the Arizona Library Association’s official website and will appear in promotional materials for the event. The 2026 conference is scheduled to take place October 21 to 23, 2026, at Casino Del Sol in Tucson, Arizona.

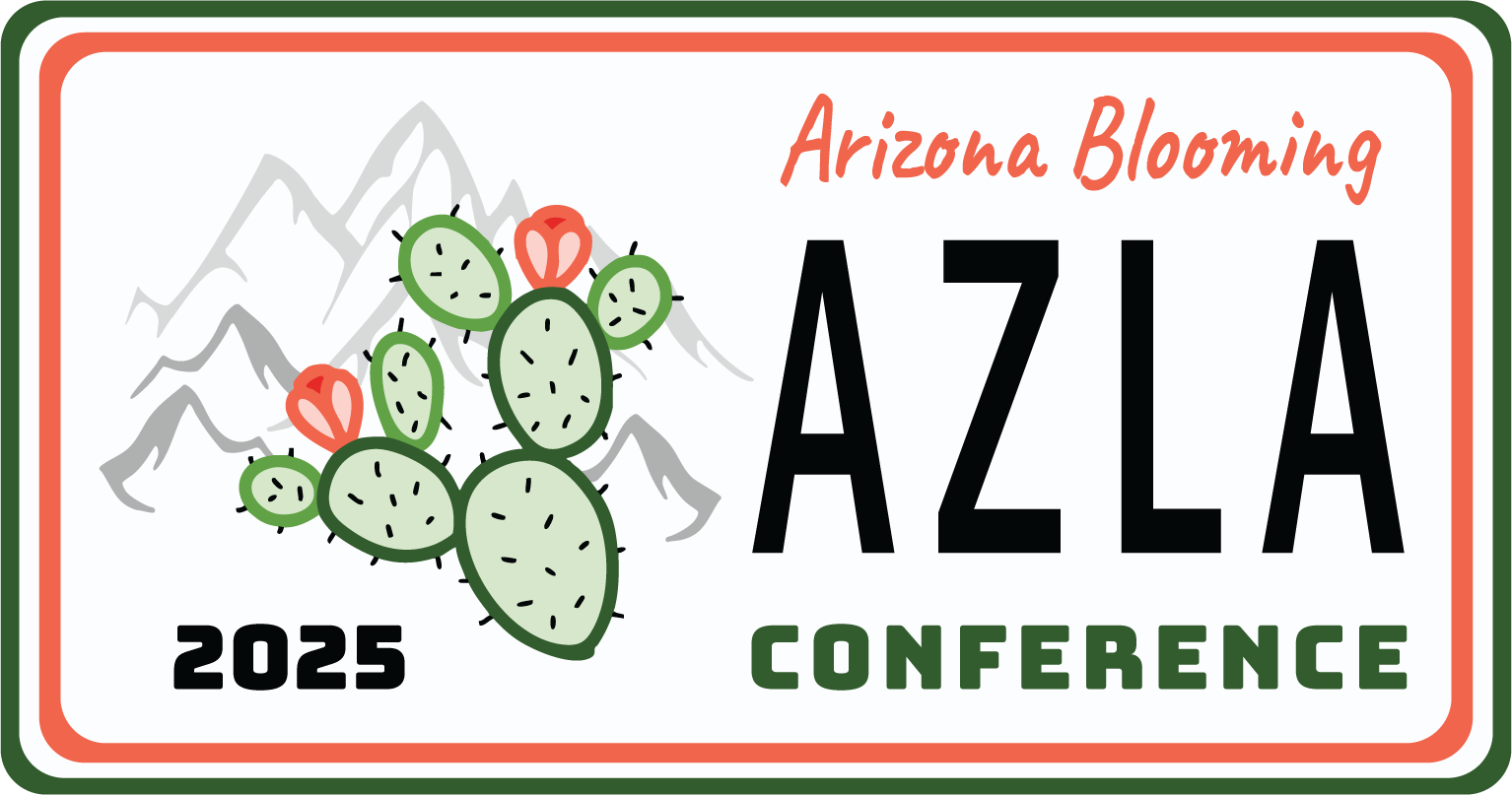
2025 AzLA Conference Logo Design

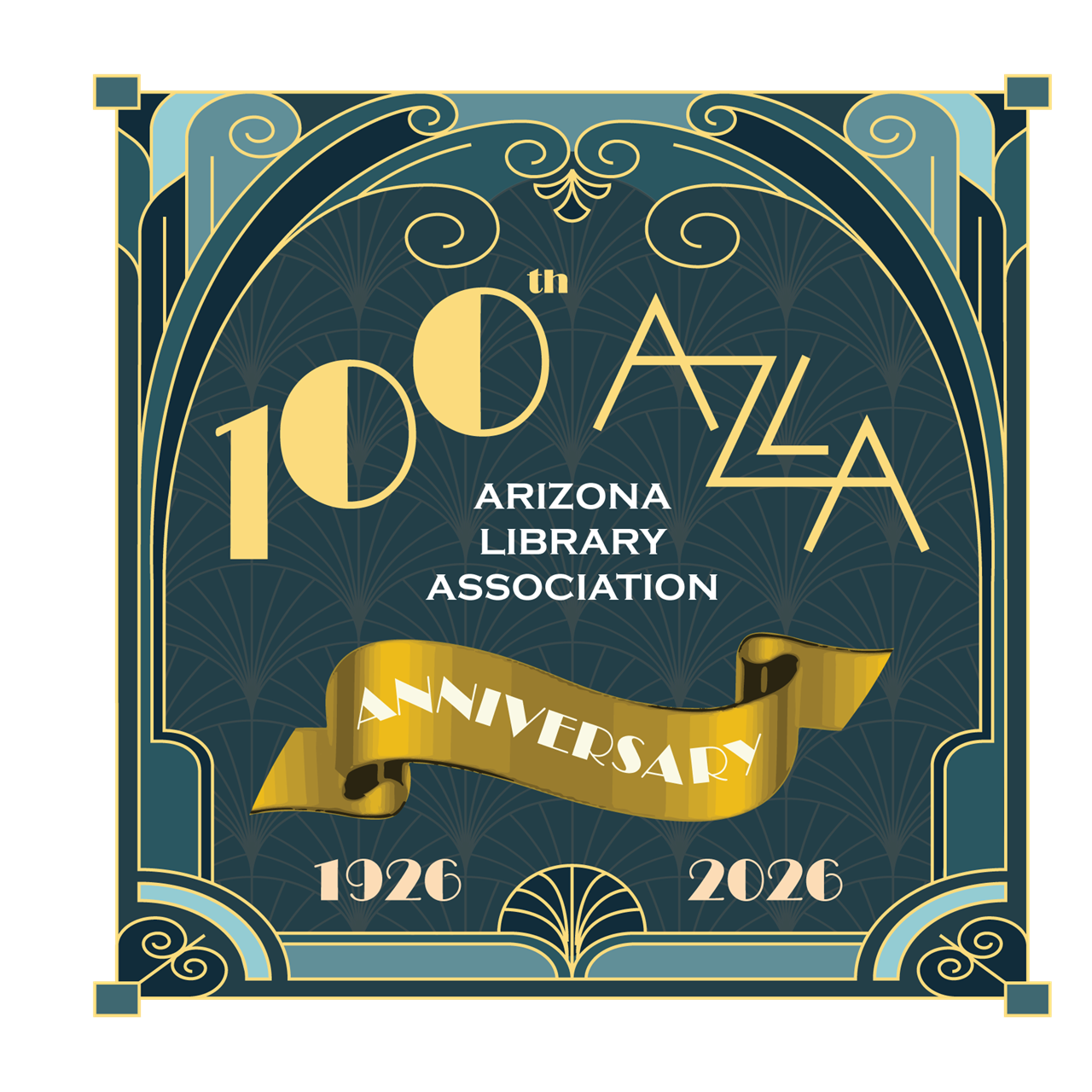
2026 - 100th Anniversary - AzLA Conference Logo Design

== See also ==
- List of libraries in the United States
