= Mitsubishi Logisnext Americas =

Logisnext Americas Inc.
- Industry: Manufacturing
- Founded: 1992; 34 years ago
- Headquarters: Houston, Texas, United States
- Products: Machinery

Logisnext Americas Inc., previously known as Mitsubishi Caterpillar Forklift America is a material handling equipment manufacturer based in Houston, Texas, United States. It is a subsidiary of Mitsubishi Logisnext.

It is the fourth-largest forklift manufacturer and operates throughout Canada, Mexico, the United States, and Latin America.

The company has manufacturing facilities located in Houston, Texas and Marengo, Illinois.

== History ==
It was founded on 1 July 1992.

In 2003, the company started implementation of lean manufacturing.

In April 2019, it acquired Pon Material Handling NA which was operating as Equipment Depot.

In December 2020, the company was renamed as Mitsubishi Logisnext Americas Inc which combined the former businesses, Mitsubishi Caterpillar Forklift America Inc. and UniCarriers Americas Corp.

In March 2026, Japan Industrial Partners (JIP) purchased Logisnext Inc. to support growth and long-term value creation. Today, Logisnext Americas offers one of the widest ranges of material handling, automation and extensive fleet solutions in the market – with five distinct lift truck and automation brands and dedicated dealer networks throughout the Americas.
