= North Pacific Group =

North Pacific Group (NOR PAC), founded in 1948 as North Pacific Lumber Company, headquartered in Portland, Oregon, was a major wholesaler and distributor of wood products, building materials, steel and agriculture commodities in the United States.

Annual sales exceeded $1.2 billion. The company had 800 employees located in 28 offices and 150 inventory locations in the United States and abroad.

In August 2010, North Pacific announced that it had agreed to sell all of its stock to an unidentified “nationally-recognized private equity firm.”
