= Timber trade =

There are multiple market layers for wood products. Each country has its own domestic market that may be connected to a regional or global market. Timber supply to domestic markets in many tropical forest countries is largely provided by informal logging, namely chainsaw milling. Regional and global markets involve producer, passthrough, processing, and consumer countries.

China has become the largest overall importer of wood products. China's imports mostly become exports to other countries including the US, the EU, Japan, and the rest of the world.

In 2016, it is estimated that only 30% of primary tropical timber products on the European Union market were verified sustainable (either PEFC or FSC). If the main timber-consuming EU countries (Germany, France, the UK, Netherlands, Italy, Belgium, and Spain) sourced only verified sustainable primary tropical timber, an estimated additional 5.3 million ha of tropical forests can be impacted.
