= Montana Federation of Colored Women's Clubs =

American women's club

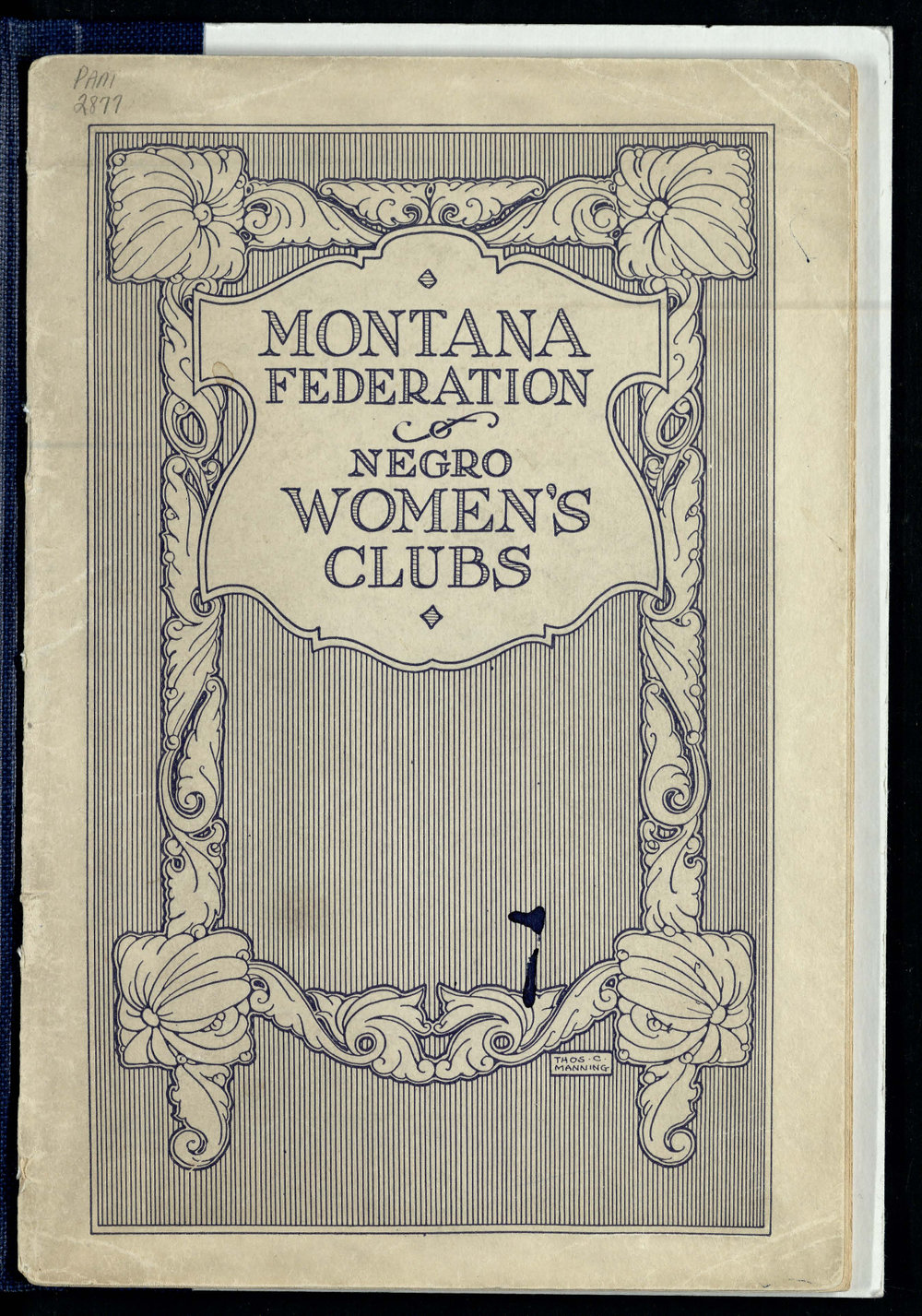
- Cover of minutes from the 1922 Annual Meeting of the Montana Federation of Colored Women's Clubs
- Formation: August 3, 1921; 104 years ago
- Founder: Mary B. Chappell
- Founded at: Butte, Montana
- Dissolved: June 17, 1972; 53 years ago
- Purpose: social and activism
- Region served: State of Montana
- Parent organization: National Association of Colored Women's Clubs
- Formerly called: Montana Federation of Negro Women's Clubs

The Montana Federation of Colored Women's Clubs (MFCWC), originally the Montana Federation of Negro Women's Clubs, was an organization of local clubs throughout Montana of African American women. The MFCWC participated in the National Association of Colored Women's Clubs and with the National Association's Northwest region offices in Seattle. They offered social activities for Black women, supported the Claudia Bivens Scholarship Fund that helped Black students attend college, lobbied for civil rights with the Montana state legislature, and held programs to improve racial relations at the state and local level. MFCWC first met in 1921, and was disbanded in 1972.

== Background ==
=== National Association of Colored Women (NACW) ===
Community clubs for Black women have existed in the United States since 1793, with the establishment of the Female Benevolent Society of St. Thomas in Philadelphia, Pennsylvania. The number of clubs increased, and in 1896, multiple Black women's clubs joined together under the name, National Association of Colored Women (NACW) with the motto, "Lifting as we climb". Their mission was raise the standard of living for the African American community. By 1914, the organization had 50,000 members in over 1,000 clubs, organized into 28 federations.

=== Founding of Montana Federation of Colored Women's Clubs ===
The first African American women's group in Montana was the Mutual Improvement Club was formed in Kalispell in 1913. Over the next 10 years, other clubs were started across the state, including the Pleasant Hour Club in Helena, the Phyllis Wheatley Club in Billings, and the Dunbar Art and Study Club in Great Falls, and The Pearl Club in Butte. By 1921, at least nine African American women's clubs were active in the state. That same year, Mary B. Chappell of Butte, called the initial meeting to organize the Montana Federation of Colored Women's Clubs as an affiliate of NACW. The federation was originally called the Montana Federation of Negro Women's Clubs and Chappell was elected as the first president. Members in attendance at the initial meeting agreed to five organizing principles: Courtesy, Justice, The Rights of Minority, and "one thing at a time, and a rule of majority".

== Activities ==
The Federation and it's associated clubs offered volunteer and social activities for Black women, lobbied for civil rights legislation to the Montana State Legislature, and worked on programs to improve race relations at the local and state level. Volunteer efforts included adding books by African American authors to local libraries, and delivering flowers to hospital patients. Activism included raising funds for the NAACP and supporting anti-lynching laws and poll tax abolishment. During World War II and after, the federation's legislative committee led the campaign to pass civil rights legislation in Montana. Between 1951 and 1955, they worked with lawmakers in Montana to introduce legislation to ban segregation in places of public accommodation. While the bill failed in the Senate, they regrouped in 1955 and recruited allies from churches, white women's organizations, and the Montana Farmers Union to support a bill that guaranteed "equal accommodations in public places to all people, regardless of race, creed, or color." This bill passed the senate, but was stripped of penalties for violating the law. The Federation offered the Claudia Bivens Scholarship Fund to help Black high school students attend college, named for the President of the Phyllis Wheatley Club that formed in Billings.

== Disbandment ==
Membership in the Federation and local clubs shrank as the Black population dwindled in Montana. On June 17, 1972, the Federation board voted to disband. Assets and funds for the Claudia Bivens Scholarship were given to the University of Montana, Missoula, to provide a Montana State Federation of Colored Women's Clubs commemorative scholarship, which is still awarded.
