= Massachusetts Lobstermen's Association =

Organization created to maintain and protect the lobster fishing in MA

- Founded: 1963
- Purpose: Lobsterfishing
- Location: Scituate, Massachusetts
- Region served: Massachusetts
- Members: 1,800
- Key people: Arthur "Sooky" Sawyer (president), Beth Casoni (executive director)
- Website: http://www.lobstermen.com

The Massachusetts Lobstermen's Association (MLA) is an organization established in 1963 to maintain and protect the lobster fishing industry in Massachusetts. The mission of the MLA is to support "the interdependence of species conservation and the members’ collective economic interests" on the state and federal level. The organization has currently 1,800 members fishing out of fifty-two ports in Massachusetts and is based in Scituate.

The MLA bills itself as one of the leading commercial fishing industry associations in New England. It has 1,800 members. The MLA advocates for the industry and serves as a resource for its members. Among the issues the association works on are insurance, federal and state regulations, USGC safety requirements, public relations, marketing, and larger issues including pollution, the economy, international developments.

The MLA found itself in a legal battle, opposing President Obama's protection of a marine monument in the Atlantic Ocean. The MLA lost the battle when the D.C. Court of Appeals upheld a ruling that continued protections for the monument.
