= Maryland Library Association =

Professional association for librarians in Maryland

- Nickname: MLA
- Formation: November 13, 1923; 102 years ago
- Tax ID no.: 52-1035154
- Parent organization: American Library Association
- Website: www.mdlib.org

The Maryland Library Association (MLA) is a professional organization for Maryland's librarians and library workers. It is headquartered in Baltimore, Maryland. It was founded in November, 1923, in Baltimore, after a letter writing campaign by Charlotte Newell from the Maryland Public Library Advisory Commission. MLA's first president was Louis Dielman from the Peabody Institute. MLA was instrumental in supporting the creation of the graduate school of library science at the University of Maryland. The organization has been incorporated as a non-profit since 1974. The MLA's official newsletter is The CRAB. MLA has a reciprocal arrangement with DCLA whereby members can participate in each other's events and conferences at membership rates. In 1996, MLA established the Maryland Author Award to honor and promote local authors.

== See also ==
- List of libraries in the United States
