= Kansas Library Association =

Professional association for librarians in Kansas

- Nickname: KLA
- Formation: December 27, 1900; 125 years ago
- Tax ID no.: 48-0720195
- Parent organization: American Library Association
- Website: kslibassoc.org

The Kansas Library Association (KLA) is a professional organization for Kansas's librarians and library workers. It was founded on December 27, 1900, in the office of the state librarian, after an earlier meeting organized by Anna LaPorte Diggs. James L. King of Topeka was elected the first president. KLA became an official state chapter of the American Library Association in 1922.

KLA was one of the first state library associations in the US to have a publicity committee which sent news of Kansas libraries direct to media outlets. KLA publishes Kansas Libraries Magazine.

== See also ==
- List of libraries in the United States
