= Mississippi Library Association =

Professional association for librarians in Mississippi

- Nickname: MLA
- Formation: October 29, 1909; 117 years ago
- Type: 501(c)(3)
- Tax ID no.: 64-6025475
- Headquarters: Jackson, Mississippi
- Parent organization: American Library Association

The Mississippi Library Association (MLA) is a professional organization for Mississippi's librarians and library workers. It is headquartered in Jackson, Mississippi in the Mississippi Library Commission building. It was founded October 29, 1909 by Whitman Davis, a librarian at Mississippi A & M College. In 1968, it became incorporated as Mississippi Library Association, Inc.

The organization publishes Mississippi Libraries (ISSN 0194-388X) a quarterly, open access publication.

MLA was a segregated library association, joining Louisiana, Alabama, and Georgia Library Associations in reporting to ALA in 1951 that there were "no formal barriers to membership," in their associations and yet, "most African Americans chose not to join." The MLA lost American Library Association chapter representation status in 1962 as a result of not complying with ALA policies requiring integrated library associations. However, they were honored by the ALA for their National Library Week activities in 1964, and integrated as a result of the Civil Rights Act of 1964.

The Mississippi Library Association sponsors author awards in the categories of Fiction, Nonfiction, and Children’s Literature.

== See also ==
- List of libraries in the United States
