= National Hardwood Lumber Association =

American lumber industry trade association

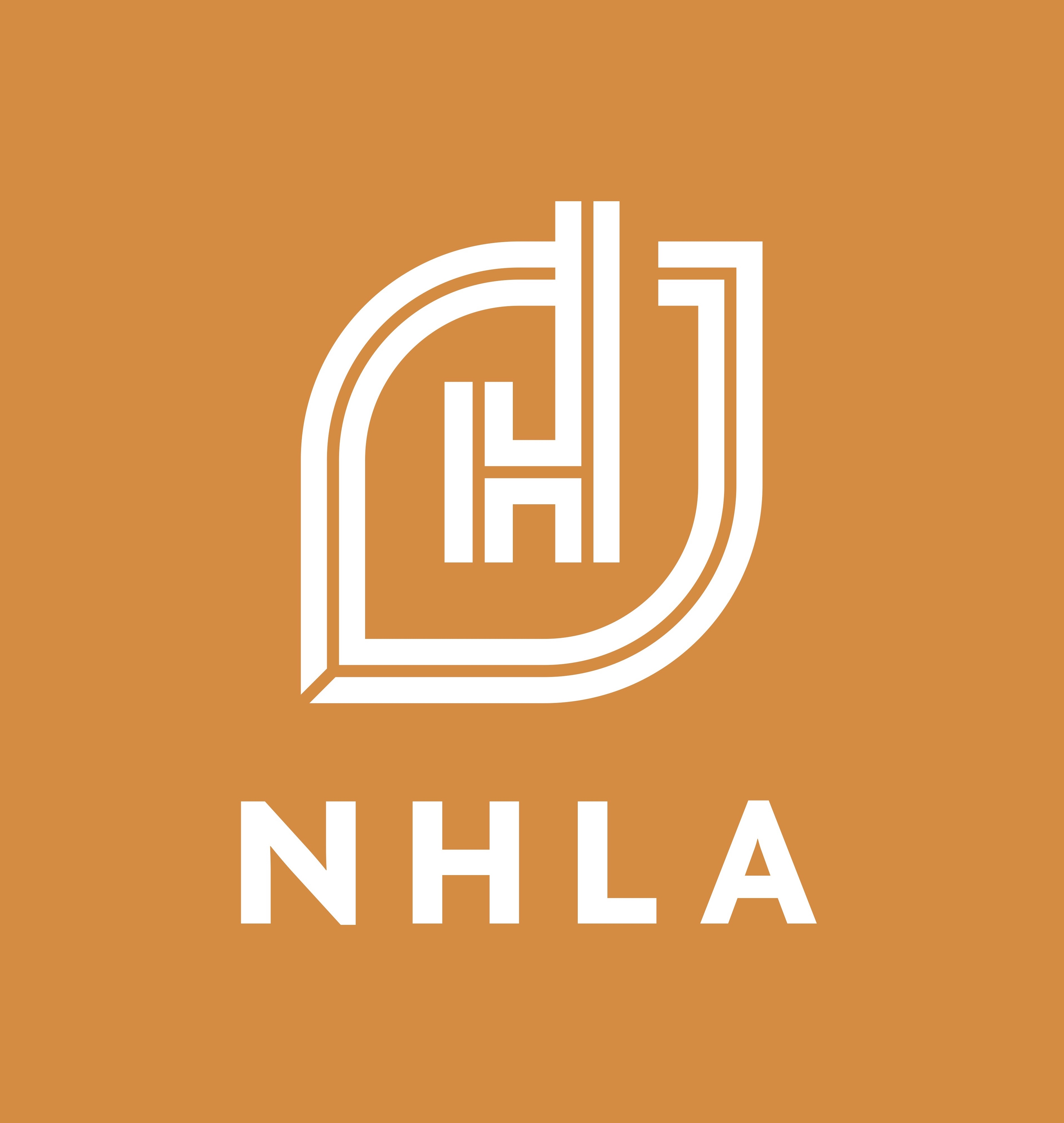
The National Hardwood Lumber Association: Founded / April 8, 1898; Abbreviation / NHLA; HQ / Memphis, TN; Industry / Hardwood lumber; Website / www.nhla.com

The National Hardwood Lumber Association (NHLA) was founded on April 8, 1898, in Chicago, Illinois to establish uniformity of inspecting hardwood lumber. The NHLA is now a membership-based trade association that serves two main purposes: to stimulate economic activity and to provide a vehicle for the members to collectively strive for mutual benefit. The NHLA has continued to be a national voice for the hardwood industry.

== History ==
Due to the Great Fire of 1871, NHLA was unable to erect their own offices in 1898, therefore they first established themselves in a dimly lit office of the Chicago Hardwood Lumber Exchange, where the first meeting of the 37 founders took place on April 8, 1898. The cities represented at this meeting were Cincinnati, OH; Chicago, IL; Boston, MA; Minneapolis, MN; Memphis, TN; Cairo, IL; St. Louis, MO; and Racine, WI. This array of attendance showed the critical situation which was threatening the industry through lack of uniform grading rules.

William A. Bennett of Bennett & Witte Company was elected the first President of NHLA and immediately appointed a committee to draft the first rules for inspection. The first Rules Committee met with 59 firms and nine markets represented, and the committee established the first standardized set of hardwood lumber grading rules.

In 1901 the Inspection Bureau was created to fulfill the uniform application of the NHLA grading rules. The Bureau was independent of NHLA and consisted of nine members appointed by the president.

In 1948, the NHLA held its 50th anniversary meeting in Cincinnati, and attendance set at a new all-time record. Post-war construction and the advent of participation in the Korean War led to the hardwood industry (as well as the NHLA grading standards) to being tested to its fullest potential.

Prior to 1979, the NHLA headquarters was in Chicago, IL, but in July 1979, the Association moved to Memphis, Tennessee. This was the beginning of a new era in the history of the NHLA.

For its first 75 years, the NHLA only offered Inspection Services to its members, however, with the move to Memphis, NHLA added a variety of additional programs.

== The "War Efforts" ==
When the United States first entered World War I, NHLA was among the first subscribers to the Liberty Loan. However, NHLA's most notable service was rendered to the United States and the Allies through assistance in the procurement of hardwood lumber and timber products essential to the war efforts.

NHLA established a War Service Bureau to oversee the procurement of huge quantities of hardwood lumber. Throughout WWI, the NHLA inspection staff was at the disposal of the United States Government and its allies.

World War II also brought the NHLA into service to benefit the war effort, and NHLA threw is full weight into the struggle for victory. NHLA staff helped develop specifications to govern the materials used in training camps, housing, and plant construction. During this period of high demand, the NHLA inspection staff increased from 28 men handling 6-million-feet monthly in December 1941, to 88 men handling 22-million feet monthly in 1945.

== Membership ==
The NHLA is a membership-based association with six member categories. NHLA membership offers opportunities to make industry contacts, grow business relations, connect with buyers and sellers around the world, education, training, resources, promotion and marketing, and a vehicle to have business' voices heard at the highest levels of government through the Hardwood Federation. The categories of membership are explained below.

National Hardwood Lumber Association Member Types & Descriptions
Member Type	Description of Membership
Active	Sawmills, Dry Kilns, Exporters, Importers, Concentration Yards, Distribution Yards, Brokers, Dimension Plants, Wholesales.
Partner	Consumption or Manufacturing, Custom Kiln Drying, Wholesaling or Distribution of Hardwood or Cypress Lumber, Veneer, Plywood, or related products with headquarters outside of North America.
Sustaining	Equipment Manufacturers, Insurance Agencies, Consultants, Software Developers, Logistics, Transportation Providers, Timberland Owners.
Associate	Cabinetry, Furniture and Flooring Manufacturers, Molding and Millworkers, Pallet Manufacturers.
Research	Individuals or organizations that conduct North American hardwood or hardwood forest products research, or those who have interest in those results.
Inspector	Individuals who grade or inspect hardwood lumber for an Active or Associate category company but do not operate their own inspection service business.

== Inspector Training School ==
In the late 1940s, demand for hardwoods continued to be brisk, but there was a shortage of competent individuals to properly grade hardwoods under the NHLA rules. Lumber was being sold without adequate inspection, and this led to dissatisfaction with the product, which cast a negative shadow on the entire industry.

Short courses had previously been held to teach the grading rules, but they were not enough to solve the problem. The NHLA responded by establishing a temporary school. At the time, Memphis, Tennessee was known as the “hardwood capital of the world,” so the city was the logical location for the new school. The first Inspector Training School classes were held in Downtown Memphis in 1948. Nickey Brothers Lumber Company generously offered ground for a building site, and a one-story building was erected in 1949. This building was specifically designed for teaching hardwood lumber grading and included a large classroom, lumber storage, and facilities for practice grading.

The success of the school is due to the interest and cooperation of the association's members. Many members furnished students with lumber for grading practice and hired the growing number of trained inspectors. Not only has the school provided a reservoir of needed inspectors, but it has also supplied numerous mill operators, proprietors, and sales executives.

== National Issues ==
The NHLA has a long history of being involved in the national and international issues that affect the hardwood lumber industry. In 1976, the hardwood lumber industry was concerned with the long-standing practice of the footage as an allowance for shrinkage in lumber measured after kiln drying. This practice was challenged as being misleading, and there was a difference of opinion among industry leaders as to how this issue would be resolved. In July 1977, the National Conference on Weights and Measurements adopted a statement outlining the proper methods for measuring kiln-dried lumber, and this statement has been thus added to each official NHLA Rule Book since that time.

Since the mid-1980s, the wood dust issue has been under scrutiny due to the findings of the Occupational Safety and Health Administration (OSHA). OSHA determined that the dust, when inhaled, is hazardous to an individual's respiratory health and is a human carcinogen, and the NHLA has worked closely with OSHA in setting the guidelines for protective equipment, proper inspection procedures, employee exposure regulation, and other requirements since set forth.

The NHLA has been an advocate for its members on the national scale by partnering with the Hardwood Federation for over 100 years. This partnership ensures that the NHLA's and its members' opinions are heard by the United States government in Washington, D.C., in regards to any and every piece of legislation that affects the hardwood lumber and forest industries. One of the most recent tasks faced by the NHLA and the Hardwood Federation was the 2018 Farm Bill. Particularly the improvement and implementation of hardwood Cross-Laminated-Timber (CLT) research, the promotion of biomass energy and wood-based biomass fuel, and improving federal forest management.

The Environmentalist Movement has been a major concern to the National Hardwood Lumber Association. The NHLA, along with many of its members, have dedicated themselves to learning and educating others about sustainable forestry practices, hardwood lumber harvesting, and legal logging. The NHLA established the Hardwood Forest Foundation in 1989 which has been involved in a variety of educational programs and activities throughout the United States and Canada, and the goal of the Hardwood Forest Foundation is to provide science-based programs to educate elementary school children throughout the United States and Canada. The very existence of the hardwood lumber industry depends upon healthy and productive hardwood forests, therefore the continuation of sustainable, legal practices is always at the forefront of the NHLA's initiatives.

== Annual Convention ==
The NHLA Annual Convention & Exhibit Showcase brings together the diverse membership of the National Hardwood Lumber Association and the entire global hardwood community. Throughout the NHLA's existence, the Annual Convention & Exhibit Showcase has grown substantially, and the convention is now the largest gathering of hardwood industry leaders in the world.

== Publications ==
The NHLA publishes the Hardwood Matters magazine as a means to disseminate information and awareness about the hardwood lumber industry throughout North America.
