= Montana State Library =

State library of Montana

Coordinates: 46.5864°N 112.0139°W

Agency overview
- Formed: Jan 1, 1929
- Jurisdiction: State of Montana
- Headquarters: 1201 11th Avenue Helena, Montana
- Agency executive: Jennie Stapp, State Librarian
- Website: www.msl.mt.gov

The Montana State Library is the official state library of Montana, located in Helena, Montana.

== Official state library ==
The library manages the Montana Digital Library Division which includes the Natural Resource Information System (NRIS), the Natural Heritage Program, the Water Information System (WIS) a program of NRIS, and the State Publications Center (SPC) which maintains a comprehensive collection of publications by state agencies. These include Montana state agency and county government web pages and websites. It also oversees statewide library resources, including Library Development consisting of leadership and guidance related to library programs, services, and buildings, as well as the Montana Talking Book Library (MTBL) which provides materials to the print-disabled. MTBL provides a broad range of materials to those individuals who are not able to read traditional print, as well as recording some Montana-related publications. It is governed by a seven-member State Library Commission. The State Library also oversees the Montana Shared Catalog which was created by the State Library in 2002 and currently has the catalogs of 174 libraries and library branches combined in one statewide catalog.

== Library logo ==
In June 2022, the state library unveiled its draft redesign of its logo, paid for by the library's private trust. Though the commissioners had been involved through the process of developing the logo, some commissioners then claimed without evidence that the new prism logo resembled a gay pride flag. The draft did not match either the color palette or the shape of commonly used pride flags. After the designers slightly altered the shades of colors used in the flag to precisely match exact shades in the Montana state flag, it was reviewed in an October public meeting. In the public meeting, not a single member of the public spoke in opposition to the logo, and even an opponent of the logo admitted that the logo was representative of "joy," not the alleged political themes. The new logo was approved by a vote of 4 to 2.

== History ==
The State Library Commission was created by an act of the Montana Legislature in 1929. The commission was given the authority to establish a State Library in 1965.

== See also ==
- List of libraries in the United States
