= New Hampshire Library Association =

Professional association for librarians in New Hampshire

- Formation: August 16, 1889; 137 years ago
- Parent organization: American Library Association
- Website: nhlibrarians.org

The New Hampshire Library Association (NHLA) is a professional organization for New Hampshire's librarians and library workers; it is the oldest state library association in the United States. It was founded in 1889 by an act of the legislature with the stated goal "to promote the efficiency of libraries and to cultivate fellowship among its members." A group of 49 library trustees and one librarian met for the first time on September 12, 1890, at the American Library Association meeting in the White Mountains. Nathan Hunt, the City Librarian of Manchester, was NHLA's first president, elected in 1891.

NHLA became a state chapter of the American Library Association in 1941.

== See also ==
- List of libraries in the United States
