= When Washington Was in Vogue =

1925 novel by Edward Christopher Williams

- Author: Edward Christopher Williams
- Publisher: The Messenger; HarperCollins
- Publication date: The Messenger: 1925-1926; HarperCollins: 2004
- Pages: 28566
- ISBN: 0-06-055545-9

When Washington Was in Vogue is a Harlem Renaissance novel written by Edward Christopher Williams, set in Washington, D.C. in 1922-3. The first epistolary novel written by an African-American, it was originally serialized in the radical magazine The Messenger between January 1925 and July 1926 as "The Letters of Davy Carr: A True Story of Colored Vanity Fair."

Largely due to the small circulation of the magazine, When Washington Was in Vogue languished in obscurity until its rediscovery and subsequent publication in 2003. It follows the adventures of Davy Carr, a scholar living among the black socialites of the Roaring Twenties.

== Synopsis ==
=== Characters ===
- Davy Carr – The protagonist and voice of the novel, Davy Carr is a scholar spending four months in Washington, D.C. researching the early American Slave Trade at the Library of Congress. While there, he engages with the thriving African-American bourgeois society and writes letters about his experiences to Bob Fletcher, a friend from Davy's time as a World War I doughboy. Although highly educated and astute in matters of philosophy and literature, Davy is far less capable as a socialite and is confused by the new-fangled tastes and expectations of the young urban elite. His complicated attraction to the very modern Caroline Rhodes, daughter of his landlady, motivates many of his letters.
- Caroline Rhodes – The most free-spirited of the women Davy meets in Washington, Caroline is a member of the high-class black elite of the city. Spending much of her time going to parties and other gatherings as a "flapper," Caroline manages to reject many of the societal expectations placed on women of her status. That she smokes, drinks spend profligately, and do not consider her darker skin a social liability sets her apart from the other women of Davy's acquaintance, and he grows more and more infatuated with her as his stay progresses.
- Bob Fletcher – The recipient of Davy's series of letters, Bob served in the military with Davy during the first World War. Since then, the two have kept up a consistent exchange of letters. Bob, though largely voiceless, does enter the story at significant points. He visits Davy during Christmas and meets many of Davy's friends. Shortly before the conclusion, Bob proposes marriage to Tommie Dawson, one of Caroline's girlfriends.

=== Plot/Themes ===
Opening when Davy Carr arrives in Washington, D.C. in October 1922, When Washington Was in Vogue takes place over the fall and winter months, as Davy becomes introduced to and integrated into the social life of the black elite. His initiation comes about through the machinations of his landlady's daughter Caroline, who introduces him to her friends and ensures that he is invited to the city's best and most significant parties. As Davy gets to know the various members of the social scene, he becomes more and more suspicious of his fellow lodger, Jeffries, whose questionable activities include attending seedy cabarets, and may extend to theft or money laundering.

The tension between the two comes to a head when Jeffries invites Caroline to join him and his friends at a cabaret. Davy follows the two, and arrives just as Jeffries attempts to rape Caroline. To the surprise of everyone present, Davy floors Jeffries with one punch and carries the unconscious Caroline out. After this episode, Caroline's reckless behavior diminishes and her respect for Davy increases—facts that everyone but Davy himself can plainly see.

The last months of Davy's stay in Washington, D. C. are spent studying at the Library of Congress and enjoying the friendships he has made. Although his letters to Bob betray a fixation on Caroline and his relationship with her, Davy does not consider her as a romantic option until just before he is scheduled to depart. When he finally voices his feelings to Caroline, she responds: "I think I loved you from the first day." They embrace, and the novel ends.

When Washington Was in Vogue explores the spoken and unspoken rules of color politics within African-American society of the period. Unusually, Williams's novel has no white characters. Davy is a light-skinned man who elects not to pass for white, and throughout the novel he and other characters discuss the tendencies of many African-American men (of any shade) to prefer women of lighter skin tones. Davy himself is quite open-minded when it comes to female beauty, and often takes the time to describe his various attractive friends to Bob. Significantly, Caroline is the darkest of Davy's female friends, thus making his choice of her as his romantic partner a transgression of the unspoken norms. The novel has been compared to Nella Larsen's Passing as a significant literary exploration of the politics of the intra-racial color line.

Additionally, the novel offers an analysis of 1920s society from the viewpoint of a conservative narrator. Davy, while educated and possessing a well-tuned aesthetic sense, is unquestionably the product of an earlier time. His and Caroline's early interest in each other stems from this difference, as her radical modernity and his stolid traditionalism render them mutually fascinating.

== Publication ==
When Washington Was in Vogue was serialized in The Messenger as "The Letters of Davy Carr: A True Story of Colored Vanity Fair." Editors A. Philip Randolph, Chandler Owen, and George Schuyler gave no indication of the novel's authorship. Adam McKible identified the literary and historical merit of the novel while researching his dissertation, and followed the trail of authorship to Edward Christopher Williams, the head librarian at Howard University from 1916 to 1929.

With McKible's editorial oversight, the collection was published as a whole novel in 2003 by HarperCollins. As almost certainly the first epistolary novel written by an African-American, When Washington Was in Vogue establishes Williams as a Harlem Renaissance writer, and as an innovator in the African American literary canon.

== Reception ==
Critical response to When Washington Was in Vogue was generally favorable. While some reviewers, such as Kirkus Reviews, called the book "of academic interest only" due to its formulaic plotlines, others saw Williams's analysis of intra-racial social politics as a fascinating window into the period. Publishers Weekly heralded it as "an invaluable addition to period scholarship", while a laudatory review in The Crisis said the novel was "a welcome and consistently entertaining glimpse of a pivotal era". With Christina Moore's 2013 "Traditional Rebirth: The Epistolary Genre in When Washington Was in Vogue," published in African American Review, the novel (as a published whole) received its first scholarly treatment outside of McKible's own work.
