= Victor Daly =

American author, soldier, and activist

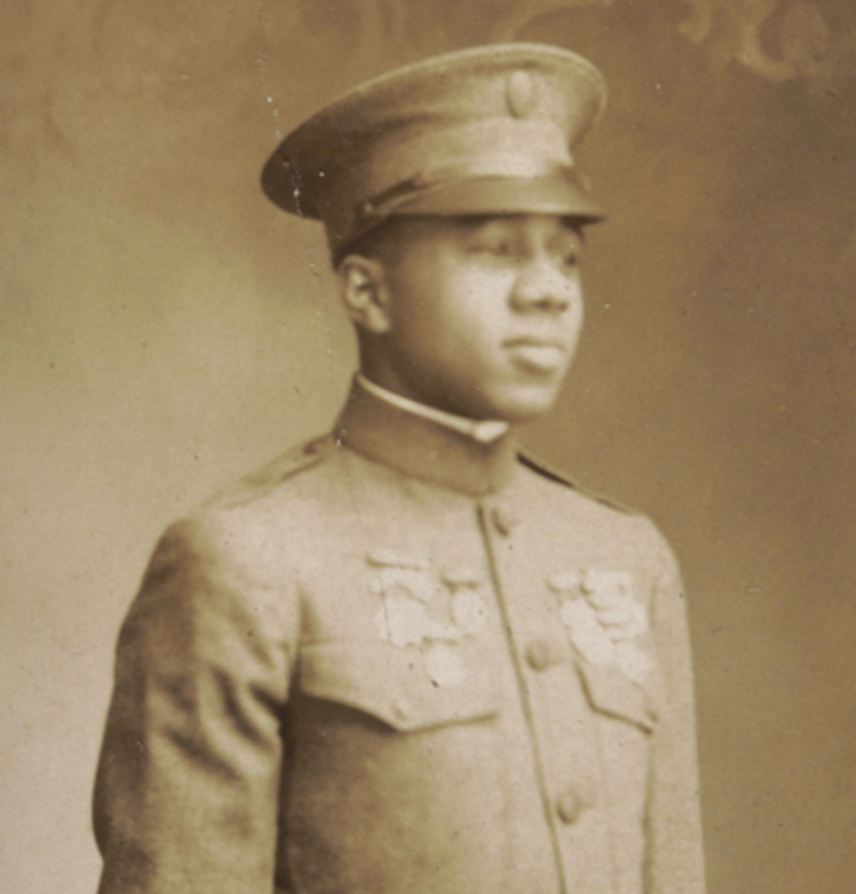
Daly c. 1917

Victor Daly (died 1986) was an American author, soldier, and civil rights activist. He fought for the United States Army in World War I. After the war, Daly worked for the literary magazine The Messenger in New York City for about a year. He moved to Washington, D.C. in 1922, where he worked in the Department of Labor. While in D.C., Daly was involved in the founding of the American Bridge Association and the Riverside Golf Club, organizations created by and for Black people in response to the segregation of contract bridge game and golf, respectively.

Daly wrote a fictional novel based on his experiences fighting in World War I, titled Not Only War: A Story of Two Great Conflicts. Published in 1932, the book was the first written by a Black author about the Black experience in the war.

== Biography ==
Daly grew up in New York City. While attending a primarily white public high school, he won several writing contests, and as a senior authored a column in The New York Evening Globe.

He entered Cornell University, where he was a member of the Alpha Phi Alpha fraternity. Although Daly left Cornell without a degree in 1917, his senior year, in 1921 the University granted him a degree.

=== World War I ===
Upon US entry into World War I, Daly enlisted in the Seventeenth Provisional Training Regiment at the Fort Des Moines Provisional Army Officer Training School, despite being under the minimum required age. At Fort Des Moines, he was trained as a military officer among around 1,200 other African Americans, from June 18 to October 14, 1917. In October, Daly was one of the camp's 639 attendees to be commissioned as officers into the US Army. Daly was commissioned as a first lieutenant. He spent the war as a member of the 367th Infantry Regiment in the 92nd Infantry Division. For his service, Daly was awarded the Croix de Guerre. While in the army, Daly experienced racism firsthand. The historian Chad L. Williams writes that Daly's service in the war left him "with his racial and political consciousness significantly hardened."

Daly was discharged from the army in April 1919. He moved to Harlem, New York, and was hired to work at the literary magazine The Messenger, initially as a business manager.

=== After the war ===
Daly also contributed articles to The Messenger while working for it, stating that he sought to raise visibility of African American service in the war through his writing. He was fired just a year later, in 1920, after A. Philip Randolph and Chandler Owen accused him of financial mismanagement. Williams speculates that this was because Daly had convinced "radical labor unions to withdraw their financial support for the paper," after he was not paid his salary. Daly subsequently sued The Messenger for unpaid wages, a case that he won. This left him unwelcome among many of the radicals that he had worked with in Harlem, and in 1922 Daly moved to Washington, D.C. There, he found employment for The Journal of Negro History, again as business manager.

Twelve years later, Daly was hired at the Department of Labor, where he conducted interviews on integration. He later became deputy director of the United States Employment Service. Daly had published two short stories in The Crisis, and in the 1930s began working on a larger novel.

This became Not Only War: A Story of Two Great Conflicts, published in 1932. The book was titled after William Tecumseh Sherman's quote that "War is Hell". Daly contended that "Not only War is Hell." The book is considered the first novel written by a Black author on the experiences of Black soldiers in World War I, and the only one by a Black veteran on the war. Although a work of fiction, the book was heavily based on Daly's service.

=== Bridge and golf ===
After moving to Washington, D.C., Daly fought for integration of contract bridge games, and golf. Historian Lane Demas describes him as the leader of organizations that lobbied the city to permit the establishment of the Black Riverside Golf Club. In 1932, he was a founding member of the all-Black American Bridge Association (ABA). Daly was later the Eastern vice president of the ABA (1941-1943), and president (1949-1963).

== Retirement and death ==
Daly retired from the government in 1967. He died in 1986.

== Bibliography ==
- Demas, Lane (2017). Game of Privilege: An African American History of Golf. UNC Press Books. ISBN 978-1-4696-3423-4.
- Gandal, Keith (2018). War Isn't the Only Hell: A New Reading of World War I American Literature. JHU Press. ISBN 978-1-4214-2511-5.
- Licursi, Kimberly J. Lamay (2018). Remembering World War I in America. U of Nebraska Press. ISBN 978-1-4962-0569-8.
- Wilson, Adam P. (2015). African American Army Officers of World War I: A Vanguard of Equality in War and Beyond. McFarland. ISBN 978-1-4766-2007-7.
- Williams, Chad L. (2010). Torchbearers of Democracy: African American Soldiers in the World War I Era. University of North Carolina Press. ISBN 978-0-8078-9935-9.
