= Edward Christopher Williams =

American novelist

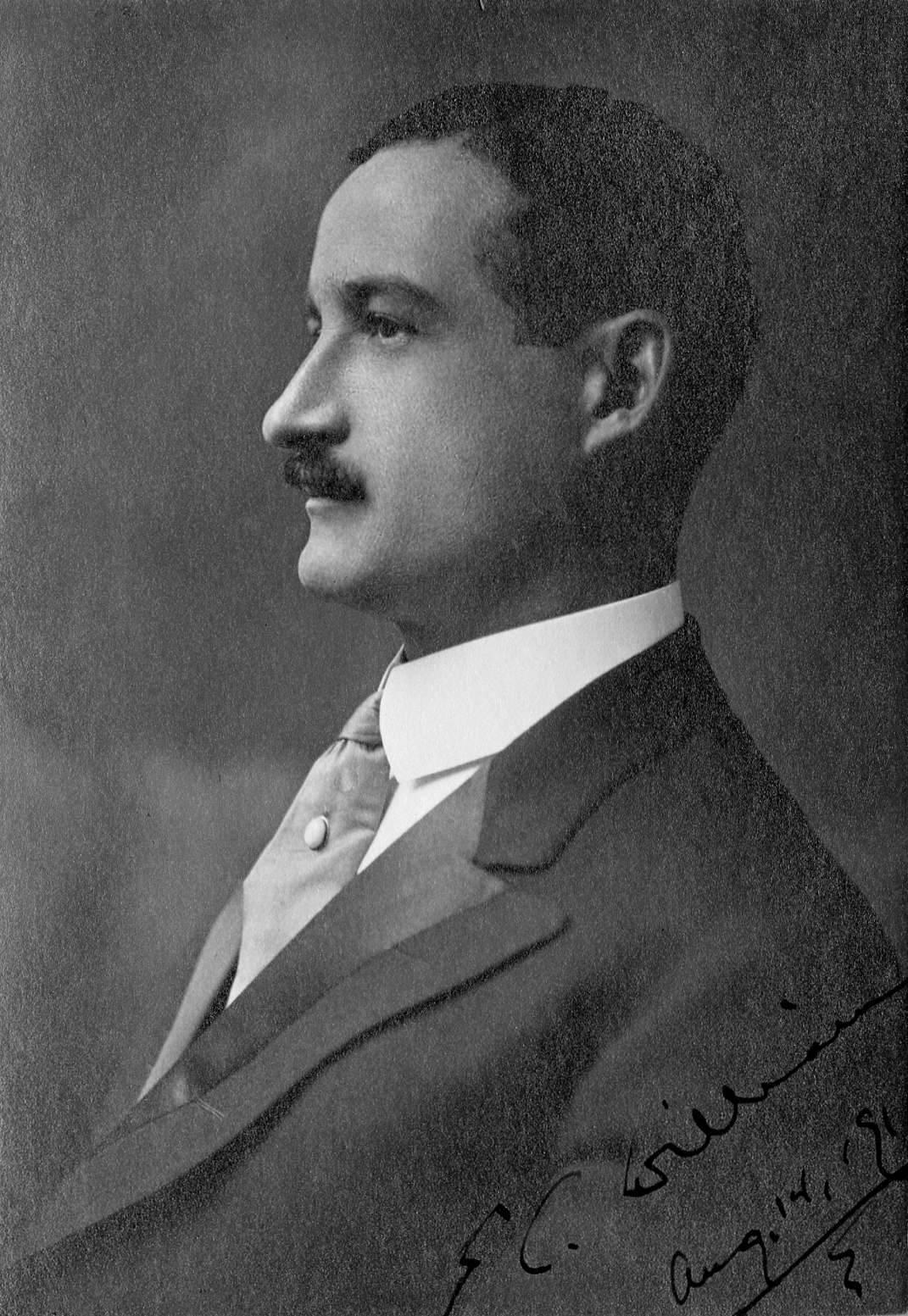
- Born: February 11, 1871; Cleveland, Ohio
- Died: December 24, 1929 (aged 58); Freedman's Hospital, Washington, DC
- Education: Western Reserve University; New York State Library
- Occupations: University librarian; Instructor; Author
- Employers: Western Reserve University; Howard University
- Known for: First professionally trained African-American librarian
- Spouse: Ethel Chesnutt
- Children: 1

Edward Christopher Williams (February 11, 1871 – December 24, 1929) was the first African-American professionally trained librarian in the United States. His sudden death in 1929 ended his career the year he was expected to receive the first Ph.D. in librarianship. Williams was born on February 11, 1871, in Cleveland, Ohio, to an African-American father and an Irish mother. Upon his graduation with distinction from Adelbert College of Western Reserve University in 1892, he was appointed Assistant Librarian of Hatch Library at WRU. Two years later, he was promoted to librarian of Hatch Library until 1909, when he resigned to assume the responsibility of the Principal of M Street High School in Washington, D.C. He continued his career as University Librarian of Howard University until his death on December 24, 1929. Williams was rediscovered as a Harlem Renaissance author with the 2004 publication of his novel When Washington Was in Vogue, considered among the earliest epistolary novels by an African American.

== Personal life ==
Edward Williams was born in Cleveland, Ohio, the only son of Daniel P. Williams, a respected personality in Cleveland, and Mary Kilkary Williams, who was of Irish origin. Edward received his education in the public schools of Cleveland, and earned a Bachelor of Arts degree from Adelbert College of Western Reserve University in 1892. As a distinguished student, he was elected to Phi Beta Kappa fraternity and was named class valedictorian.

Edward married Ethel Chesnutt, the daughter of the writer Charles Waddell Chesnutt, in 1902. They had one son, Charles Chesnutt Williams, who later became a lawyer, and died before completing a biography of his father.

== Career ==
Williams began his library career in 1892 as an assistant librarian in Hatch Library of Western Reserve University (WRU). After two years, he was promoted to library director.

In 1898, Williams took a sabbatical leave to pursue a master's degree in librarianship at New York State Library. He completed the two years program in one year and went back to resume his responsibilities at WRU as Librarian and Instructor until 1909. He was credited with doubling the size of the collection at WRU.

Prior to the establishment of the WRU Library School, Williams taught some courses in national bibliography; he was also on the committee that recommended the school's establishment. Upon opening the library school in 1904, he was appointed instructor of bibliography and reference. In 1909, Williams resigned from his position at WRU and was appointed as Principal of the M Street High School (Dunbar High School) in Washington, D.C., where he served for seven years.

In 1916, Williams was elected head librarian of Howard University, where he spent 13 years serving the University Library and developing its collection. Williams also assumed additional responsibilities as a professor of bibliography, instructor of German language, chair of the romance languages department, and director of library training classes. During his career at Howard University, he advocated for the need for professional personnel, and he worked on improving the quality of the library resources. Williams also assumed additional responsibilities as a professor of bibliography, instructor of German language, chair of the romance languages department, and director of a Library Training Class. In a Howard news release he was referred to as "The Dean of the library school."

== Library associations ==
In addition to his profession as librarian and instructor, Williams collaborated on the establishment of many associations. He was a founding member of the Ohio Library Association (OLA) and was elected secretary in 1904. As the chairman of the Ohio Library Association's College Section, he gave many speeches and lectures at the Ohio Institute of Library Workers. Williams was also a member of the American Library Association and assisted in its conventions and sessions. He gave a lecture in 1928 in a session of ALA's College and Reference titled "Library Needs of Negro Institutions" and was involved in planning the first conference for African American librarians, held at Fisk University in 1930.

Williams served as vice-president of the New York State Library School Association in 1904.

== Works ==
In addition to his library profession, Williams was also an author and translator. His works include: The Exile (an Italian classical drama), The Sheriff's Children, The Chasm, and many articles, poems and short stories published in The Messenger between 1925 and 1927.

Williams' main writings were based on the problems of Washington's black society as in his novel The Letters of Davy Carr, a True Story of Colored Vanity Fair, serialized in The Messenger from January 1925 to July 1926. Sometimes, he used a pseudonym, Bertiuccio Dantino, to sign his articles.

Williams excelled in five languages: English, French, German, Italian and Spanish. He translated some documents from different languages into English. Early in his career, he received job offers to become a translator.

The Letters of Davy Carr was rediscovered by scholar Adam McKible and published as When Washington Was in Vogue in 2004, establishing Williams' place in the canon of Harlem Renaissance literature.

== Death ==
Williams was preparing for advanced studies to earn the first Ph.D. in library science offered by Columbia University, when he died unexpectedly on December 24, 1929, at Freedmen's Hospital. The funeral was held at the Andrew Rankin Memorial Chapel on the Howard University campus, in the presence of the President of the university, Dr. Mordecai Johnson, who presided over the ceremony. Edward Christopher Williams was buried at Lincoln Cemetery in Suitland, Maryland.

Edward Williams was not only a successful professional librarian and author at the time of segregation but a social activist too. He was raising the problems and challenges faced by the black people libraries as deteriorated buildings, shortage in staff and lack of funding at every convention. He was also helping young black men and women to pursue their education and expand their knowledge to become successful people.

Williams admired Saint Augustine, and his favorite quotation was "Always proceed, never stand still nor go back nor deviate. Be always displeased at what thou art. If thou sayest 'I have enough,' thou diest," which was reflected clearly throughout his life and career. E. J. Josey celebrated Williams' career and achievements in his 1969 article:

Edward Christopher Williams' life was not a mere life for us to let pass into oblivion historically, for it was a vast spectacle of scholarly achievements in writing, translating, and understanding the complex problems of libraries; and, it was also a panorama of prodigious teaching and motivation to lead his students to excellence in librarianship …

In 1999, American Libraries named him one of the "100 Most Important Leaders We Had in the 20th Century".

== See also ==
- Virginia Proctor Powell Florence – first black woman to earn a library science degree in the U.S.
