= Slaves Today =

1931 novel by George Schuyler

Slaves Today; A Story of Liberia
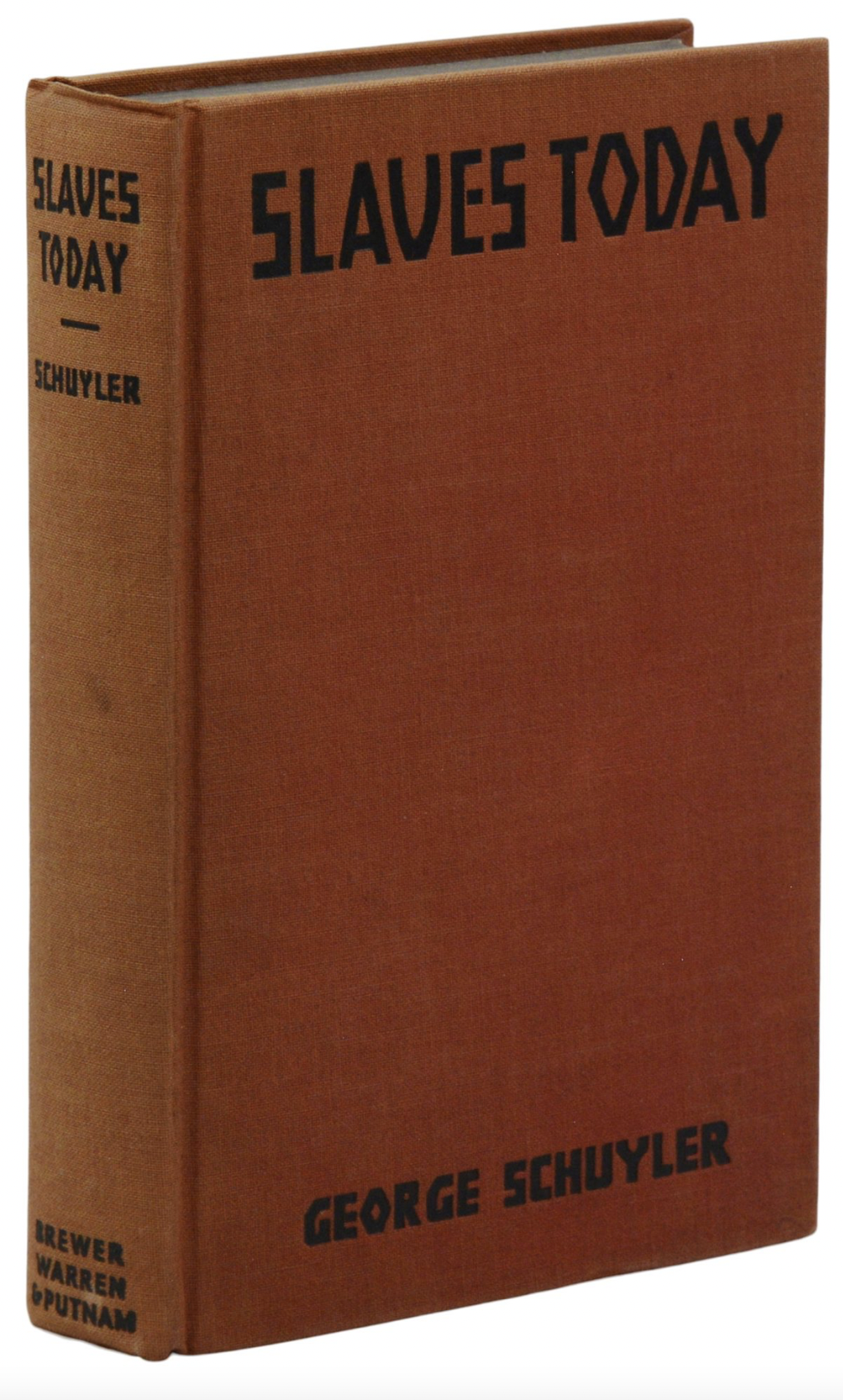
- 1st Edition Copy of Slaves Today
- Author: George Schuyler
- Language: English
- Publisher: Brewer, Warren and Putnam
- Publication date: 1931
- Publication place: United States
- Media type: Novel
- ISBN: 0-404-00209-9

Slaves Today; A Story of Liberia is a novel written by African American author George Schuyler. The first edition of the book was published in 1931 by Brewer, Warren and Putnam in New York. A subsequent 1969 edition was published by McGrath Publishing Co. in College Park, Maryland. The book was first published the same year as Schuyler's Black No More.

Schuyler spent three months in Liberia and based his fictional story on his perspective of labor issues and Americo-Liberian relations with indigenous tribes during the early years of the Great Depression.

Schuyler writes in the foreword of Slaves Today that his depiction of Liberian native abuse is meant to convince the citizens of primarily White nations to end similar abuse in their countries. He also notes the irony of Liberia as a country engaged in active slavery, mentioning that the Republic was founded by freed African American slaves and that their motto is The Love of Liberty Brought Us Here.

Critical analyses of Slaves Today differ in opinion as to the successfulness of the novel, with some claiming it to be possibly self-contradictory in nature and insulting to the reader, while others hailing it to be a “complex and innovative synthesis” between indigenous African culture and American literary norms, allowing for easy reception and relatability among readers.

== Plot summary ==
Slaves Today, a Story of Liberia takes place exclusively in the Republic of Liberia and on the Spanish island Fernando Po. It follows the protagonist, Zo, as he leaves the comfort of his village, Takama, to various destinations where he is forced into slavery. This is usually–either directly or indirectly–at the hands of District Commissioner David Jackson. The plot has been described as a love story that ends in tragedy when faced with corrupt bureaucracy.

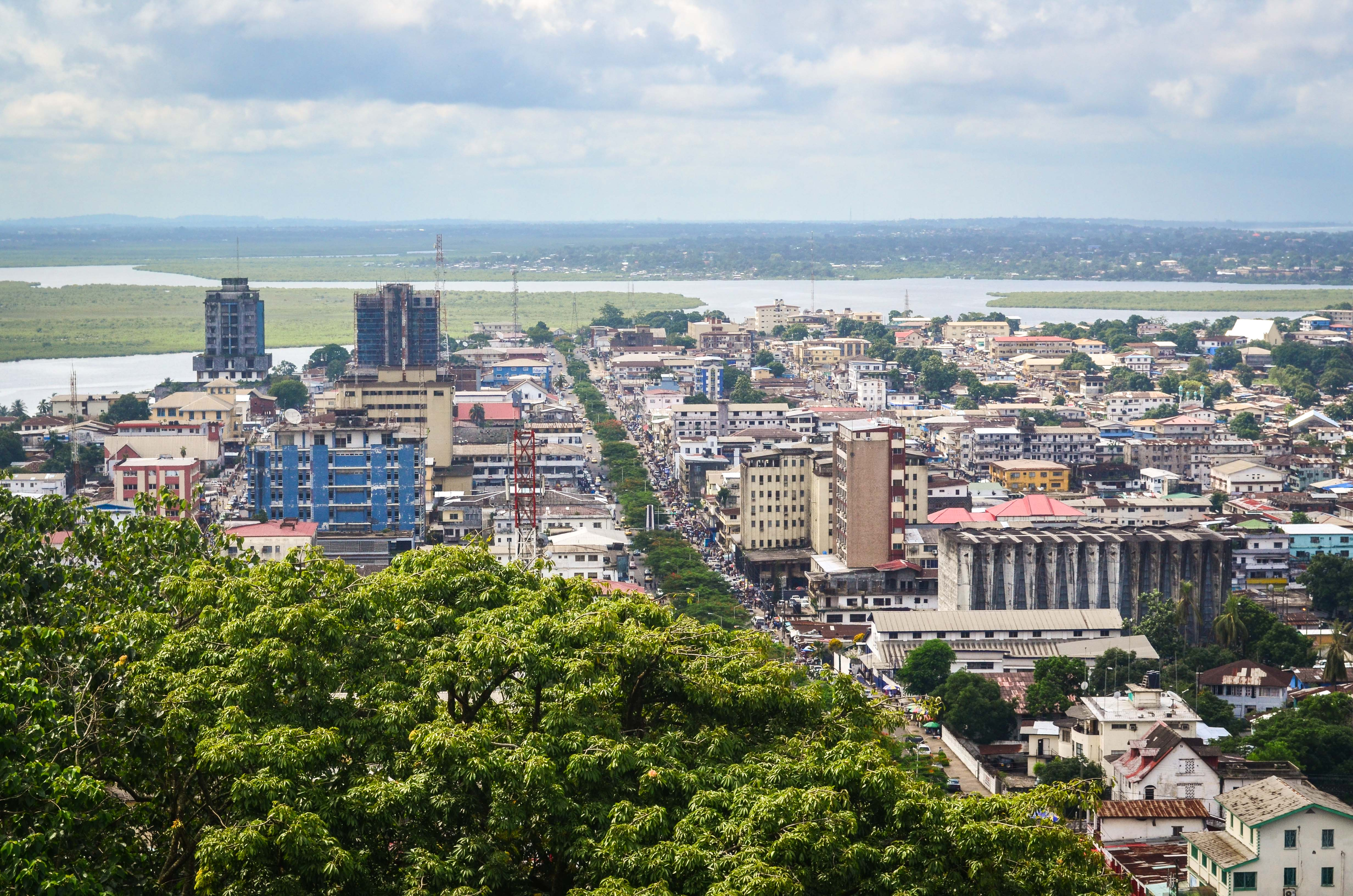
Present day Monrovia, Liberia

=== Monrovia (Johnson) ===
The novel begins in Monrovia, the capital of Liberia, through the perspective of president Sidney Johnson. Lamenting Liberia's poor economic status, president Johnson promotes David Jackson to District Commissioner. Among his reasons for doing so was that he felt Jackson would recruit more villagers to work at Fernando Po, a Spanish labor island.

=== Takama to Boloba ===
The perspective switches to the village of Takama. The villagers celebrate the successful marriage of Zo, the story's main protagonist, and Pameta, Chief Bongomo's daughter. When newly-appointed District Commissioner David Jackson comes to the village to collect monthly taxes and food rations, the village is unable to provide their quota due to their excessive celebration. Chief Bongomo is subsequently whipped, repeatedly, in front of his village, horrifying the natives. He retaliates, attacking Jackson, and is killed by a nearby sergeant's pistol. The Liberian officials stay overnight at the village, and upon leaving the next morning, secretly kidnap Pameta. After realizing her absence, the village determines that Zo is to blame for their recent misfortune, and Zo is whipped until he confesses to his wrongdoings. Outcast and embarrassed, Zo leaves Takama in the hopes of rescuing Pameta.

=== Boloba to Monrovia ===
Zo eventually reaches Boloba, a village adjacent to the headquarters of their district. Upon speaking to the chief of the village, he learns that Pameta is held captive inside District Commissioner Jackson's house. When Zo breaks into the house, both himself and Pameta are captured; Zo is whipped again, has salt rubbed into his wounds, and is held captive in a dark hut. Pameta is returned to Jackson's room. Jackson orders the prisoners in the huts, including Zo and about 40 others, to be taken to Monrovia, where they will be sold to work on Fernando Po. While walking to Monrovia, Zo meets Soki, who Zo will later describe as his best friend. During their trek through the forest, Zo and Soki attempt an escape, seeking refuge in a small nearby village. They are found by the soldiers, and attempt to run away from them. In their escape, Soki becomes trapped in thick mud, presenting Zo with the option to either escape himself or to help Soki and be captured by the soldiers. Zo chooses to help Soki, reinforcing their friendship. They are both recaptured, and Soki is whipped; Zo is spared because of the condition of his back from an earlier whipping.

=== Monrovia to Fernando Po ===
==== Arrival ====
Upon reaching Monrovia, the prisoners are held captive in a large warehouse for three days. The warehouse's tin roof under the sun makes the heat unbearable for the villagers, and they seldom receive food or water. On the morning of the third day they are forced onto a boat, the Santa Clara, and taken to Fernando Po. They are taken below the main deck to a small room, where they are again faced with intense heat and stench, which makes breathing difficult for Zo. Immediately after reaching Fernando Po, the prisoners are again ordered into a warehouse. Zo is adamant about escaping the confines of the island and returning to the mainland. Zo and the other slaves begin their work the next day; Zo describes their work day as being from dawn to sunset. They are paid a small salary each month, which the prisoners typically spend immediately on prostitutes or goods at exorbitant prices. Zo typically saves his money in the hopes that it will aid him in escaping the island. Soki is usually critical of this, along with Zo's plans to escape, believing it will do more harm than good.

==== Attempted escape ====
Towards the end of his assigned two-year term on Fernando Po, Zo is given a work assignment where he is allowed to go into the city with an overseer, Juan. Juan introduces Zo to Marie, a Spanish woman who promises to help Zo escape the island via a steamship in exchange for the money he had saved. Marie swindles Zo, taking his money and informing Juan of Zo's attempt to leave. Zo is not punished for this, but is demoted from the position granting him access to the city; he returns to his former position as a laborer. All attempts to leave the island to this point have been thwarted, and with less than two weeks before his term on Fernando Po is finished, Zo relinquishes his efforts to escape, though he finds comfort in realizing that he tried harder than his fellow prisoners to leave the island.

==== Hospital and departure ====
A rainy period on the island causes disease among the prisoners to skyrocket. Zo, who had thus far been lucky to not have fallen sick, contracts a disease and is subsequently taken to the hospital. He describes the hospital as palatial compared to the warehouse he had been staying in, going so far to claim it was the finest place he had ever slept. He contrasts this with the countless other prisoners suffering from a variety of disease, including his friend Big Georgie, who contracted yellow fever, and several others who had fallen ill to elephantiasis, malaria, and STIs from the plantation prostitutes. Georgie and many others would die during his short stay at the hospital. Zo recovers, and he is returned to the plantation to work out his final days. On the last day, as the men begin to slow down their pace in their excitement to return home, Soki is shoved to the ground by the head overseer and ridiculed for his slow work. He retaliates, attacking the soldier, who fires a shot, ending the altercation. Soki is uninjured, but is forced to remain in Fernando Po as his comrades board the ship for their return to Monrovia. Zo is thankful to finally be off the island, but his mood is tainted by the loss of his best friend.

=== Monrovia (Pameta) ===
The perspective shifts from Zo to Pameta. Pameta recounts her experiences over the last two years that she has been held captive, notably her position as Jackson's favorite concubine. She notes that her health has deteriorated since her capture, evidenced by her newly pimply skin, skin sores, and rheumatic pain. She was originally captive in Boloba, the place of her initial failed escape with Zo, however now resides in Monrovia with Commissioner Jackson. Pameta is hated by Jackson's other mistresses, as he provides her more attention than them; she claims that she would gladly switch positions with them if permitted to do so.

A very ill Pameta accompanies Jackson, who has now been promoted to Director of Public Works, on a trip to Kakata, where Jackson forces the natives to work on a road for no pay. After a few days, a native Chief requests Jackson to lessen their time on the road, as they have no personnel available to tend to their crops. Jackson declines this request, outraged. Jackson is proud of himself for his restraint, however, noting that he could have fined or whipped the man with no repercussions.

=== Zo's Return to Monrovia ===
The novel returns focus to Zo's arrival in Monrovia. Zo is happy that he is free, and wanders through the city without a defined purpose. He meets a man and they both travel to a part of the city to see a midnight dance. Zo, being known as an excellent dancer in Takama, joins the dance. His fun is cut short when, after the dance concludes, he is arrested for disturbing the peace. He is thrown into a disgusting jail cell, and attends his trial the next morning. The prosecution claims that Zo had been involved in a fight, though they can provide no evidence. Zo is fined for all of the money in his possession and is let free.

Feeling himself unwelcome in the city, Zo travels to the nearby village Webbo, where construction of the new road is underway. He is promptly captured by a soldier and again taken prisoner to work on the road. He manages to escape, and finds Pameta further along the road. Pameta has just been raped by Jackson, and is near death; likely the consequence of an STI transmitted to her from Jackson, as it is noted his previous wives shared the same fate. Zo takes Pameta to a hut, where she dies as he sits helplessly next to her.

Zo is outraged at the misfortunes Jackson has caused him, and sneaks past the armed guards to enter the director's house. Zo attacks Jackson with a bush knife, and then continues his assault as Jackson lies on the floor. The sound of Jackson falling alerted the guards, who shoot and kill Zo as he tries to escape.

=== Election Day ===
The novel concludes with the Liberian election. The Conservative party provides thousands of dollars' worth of food and alcohol to sway the voter's opinions. Once the voters have been fed and are drunk enough, the Conservative party members take them to the ballot to cast their votes. Additionally, several trucks are used to transport Conservative voters who have already voted to distant locations in the country, with the purpose of them voting yet again. The Liberal Party candidate Tom Saunders and his small team cry out about the blatant election violations, but with the majority of the law enforcement loyal to President Johnson, nothing is done. Rather, several Liberal Party members are arrested or beaten. The Liberian citizens shout out their praise for Johnson, fueled by the food and drink he provided, without a clue of what they have voted for. After votes have been cast, a Party official notifies Johnson that they had won the election, although it had cost them all of the money in the nation's treasury. Johnson states that it was worth it in exchange for another four years in power.

== Select characters ==
- Zo - The main protagonist. He is married to Pameta. The novel is centered mainly from his point of view and follows Zo's travels as he attempts to rescue Pameta from David Jackson. He is frequently imprisoned and forced to do slave labor. At the end of the novel he kills Jackson and is then killed by guards.
- Pameta - Zo's Wife. For the majority of the novel she is imprisoned by David Jackson and is forced into concubinage with him. She is described as Jackson's "favorite," leading the other women to dislike her. She will eventually die of disease from her mistreatment.
- David Jackson - Appointed District Commissioner by president Johnson. Jackson is the central antagonist of the novel. He is portrayed as especially cruel, ordering the whipping of Chief Bongomo, raping Pameta, and selling villagers into slavery at Fernando Po, among many other atrocities. Jackson views the Liberian natives as "but rungs on the ladder to riches and power."
- Sidney Cooper Johnson - The president of Liberia. He is affiliated with the Conservative party, which is described as corrupt, due to their unfair manipulation of the Liberian elections and participation in slave trade with Spain.
- Sammy Williams - The vice president of Liberia. Similar to President Johnson, he is a member of the Conservative party. He is described as a large man, standing at 250 pounds and being over 6 feet tall. His chief interest is "making as much money as possible," and achieves this through his association with the slave trade on Fernando Po.
- Tom Saunders - The leading member of the Liberal party. He is in opposition to the Conservative party's participation in the slave trade, believing that it is unsustainable. One of his main goals is to expose the Conservative party's business practices. He consistently leads the polls for the Liberal party, but never wins due to the Conservative party's corruption and illegal manipulation of Liberian elections.
- Marie - Spanish girl on Fernando Po that promises to help Zo escape in exchange for money. She tricks him, instead notifying Zo's overseer, who demotes and humiliates him.
- Tolo - Witch doctor/medicine man in Takama. He creates a voodoo doll of Jackson after Jackson kills chief Bongomo. He places a poisonous thorn into the doll every day, with the intent that Jackson will come nearer to death with each thorn. Interestingly, Jackson's drinking habits get worse throughout the novel, and at the end of the novel he dies from stabbing wounds.

== Critical reception ==
A review describes the hero of the story, Zo, as pan-African. The book has been described as the first novel about Africa written by an African American. The same reviewer described it as having a journalistic and anthropological style.

A 1932 review by Nnamdi Azikiwe, who would become the first president of independent Nigeria, was published in the Journal of African American History and described the book as being historical fiction and stated that forced labor is a function of colonialism and imperialism.

Academics reviewing Slaves Today have differing opinions about the effectiveness of the novel. A Review by Dr. Benjamin S. Lawson claims that Schuyler's views of Liberia are possibly self-contradictory to the reader, and attributes this to the differing views within African American culture at the time. He further adds that the complexity of the work may lead it to be viewed as insulting to the reader. In contrast, a review by Minnesota Senator Aric Putnam describes Slaves Today as a “complex and innovative synthesis” between indigenous African culture and American literary norms, allowing for easy reception and relatability among readers. Putnam further argues that the text was influential in its ability to provide a source for Black identity within the United States during the Great Depression era.
