= Philippa Schuyler =

American pianist, composer, author, and journalist (1931–1967)

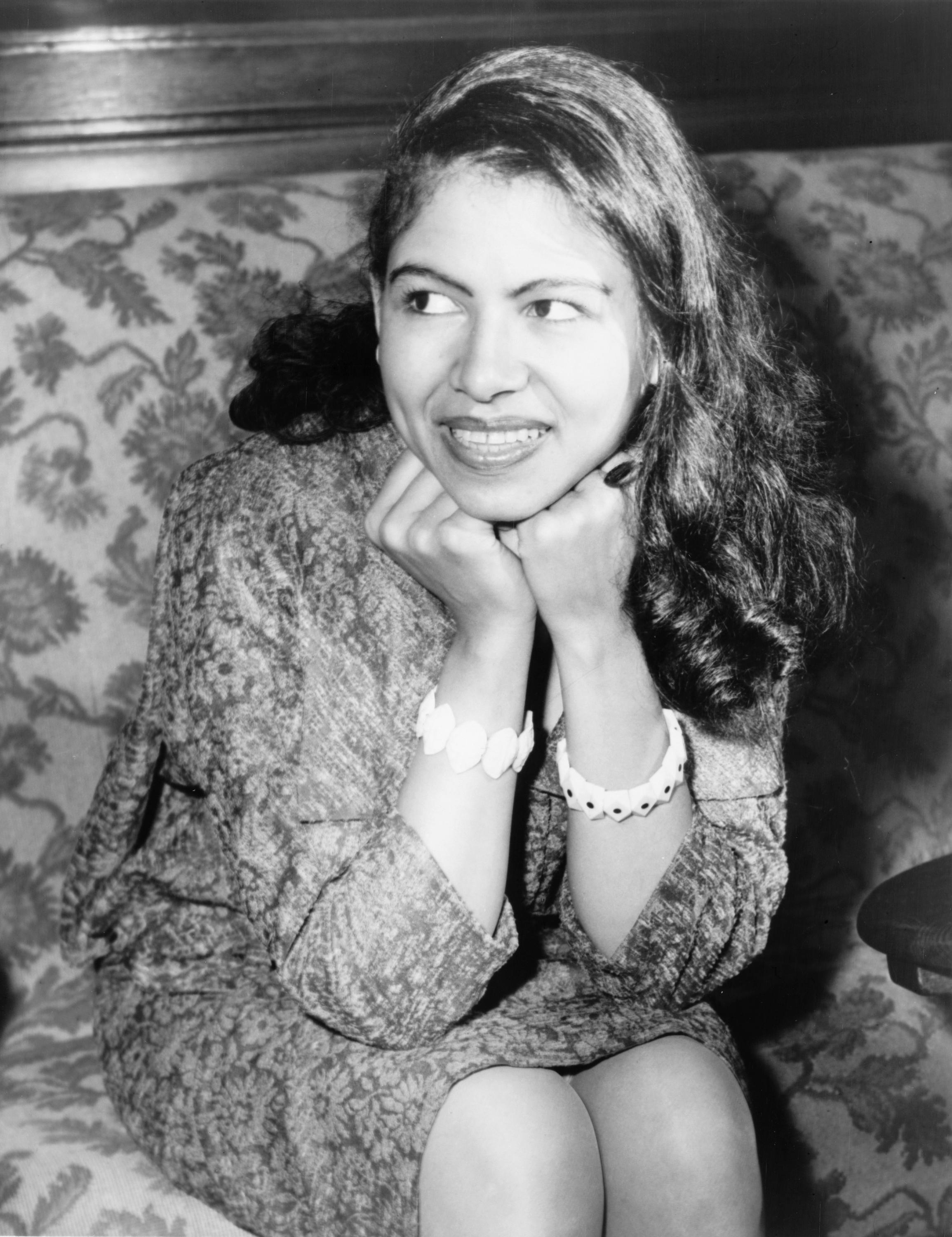
- Schuyler (1959)

Background information
- Born: Philippa Duke Schuyler; August 2, 1931; Harlem, New York, U.S.
- Origin: United States
- Died: May 9, 1967 (aged 35) Da Nang, South Vietnam
- Genres: Classical
- Occupations: Pianist, composer, non-fiction writer
- Instrument: Piano

Philippa Duke Schuyler (/ˈskaɪlər/; August 2, 1931 – May 9, 1967) was an American concert pianist, composer, author, and journalist.

A child prodigy, she was the daughter of black journalist George Schuyler and Josephine Schuyler, a white Texan heiress. Schuyler became famous in the 1930s for her talent, intellect, mixed race parentage, and the eccentric parenting methods employed by her mother.

Hailed as "the Shirley Temple of American Negroes," Schuyler performed public piano recitals and radio broadcasts by the age of four. She performed two recitals at the New York World's Fair at the age of eight. Schuyler won numerous music competitions, including the New York Philharmonic Young People's Concerts at Carnegie Hall. At 11, she became the youngest member of the National Association for American Composers and Conductors. Schuyler encountered racism as she grew older, and had trouble coming to terms with her mixed-race heritage. She later became a journalist and was killed in a helicopter crash in South Vietnam in 1967.

== Life and career ==
=== Early life ===
Philippa Duke Schuyler was born in Harlem, New York on August 2, 1931. She was the only child of George Schuyler, a prominent black essayist and journalist, and his wife Josephine Schuyler (née Cogdell), a white Texan and one-time Mack Sennett bathing beauty and the granddaughter of slave owners. Her parents believed that intermarriage could "invigorate" both races, produce extraordinary offspring, and help solve social problems in the United States.

For three years before Schuyler's birth, her mother ate only natural and raw food, avoided meat, and went on a body- and mind-preparing regime to cleanse her system and prepare to bear a "superior" child. Mrs. Schuyler believed that genius could best be developed by a diet consisting exclusively of raw foods. As a result, Philippa grew up in her New York City apartment eating a diet predominantly of raw carrots, peas, and yams and raw steak. She was given a daily ration of cod liver oil and lemon slices in place of sweets. "When we travel," Mrs. Schuyler said, "Philippa and I amaze waiters. You have to argue with most waiters before they will bring you raw meat. I guess it is rather unusual to see a little girl eating a raw steak."

She was recognized as a prodigy at an early age. In 1933, a New York Herald Tribune writer called her the "Negro Baby." Schuyler reportedly knew the alphabet at 19 months and was able to read and write at the age of two. By four years old, she could play compositions by Schumann and Mozart and was writing her own. Her intelligence quotient (IQ) at the age of six was found to be 185.

=== Music career ===
Schuyler's mother was an overbearing stage mother who entered her into every possible music competition. In June 1936, four-year-old Schuyler won her first gold medal at the annual tournament sponsored by the National Guild of Piano Teachers, where she performed ten original compositions. She won eight consecutive prizes from the New York Philharmonic Young People's Concerts at Carnegie Hall, then was barred from competing because the other children had little chance to win against her. She also won gold medals from the Music Education League and from the City of New York.

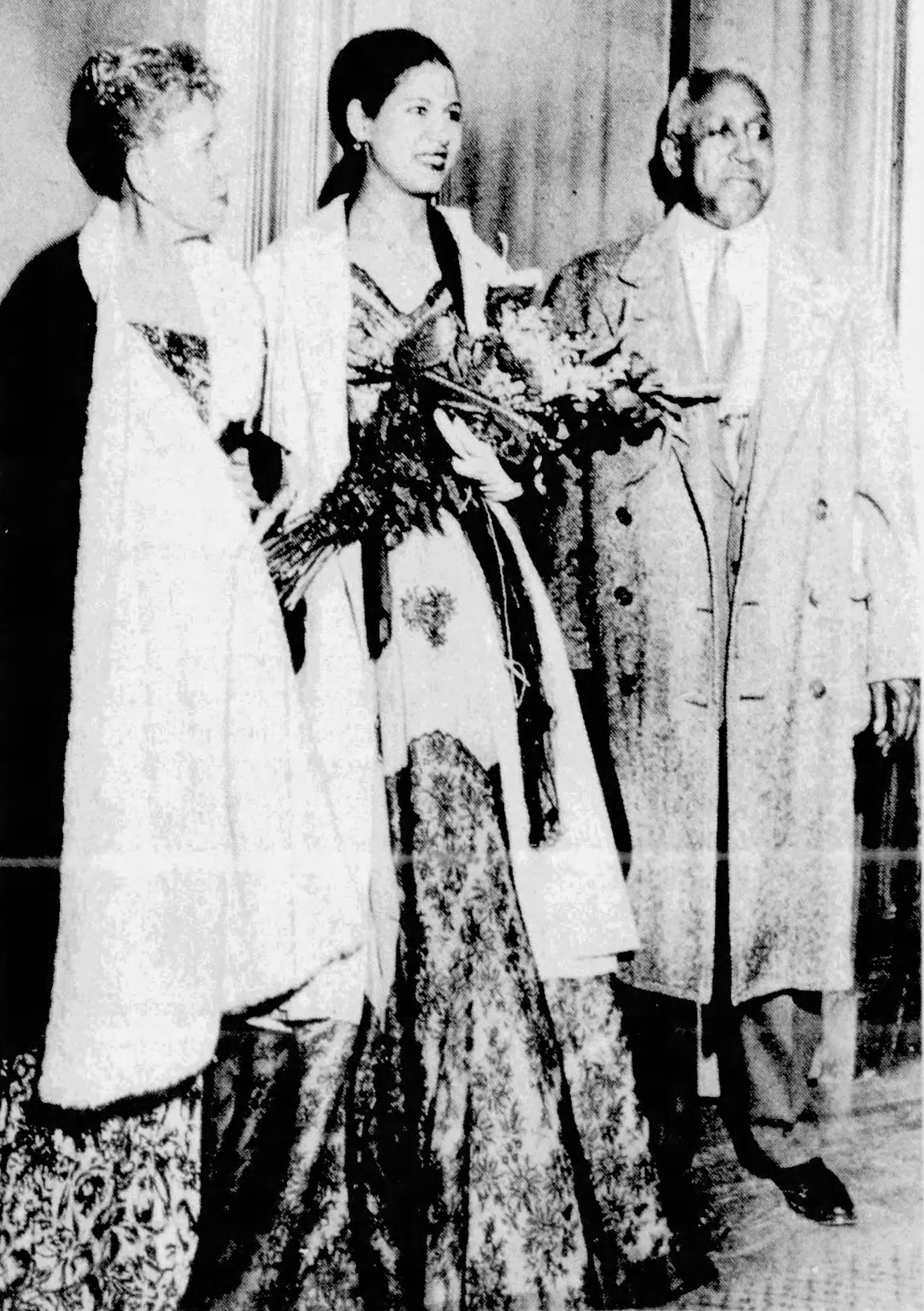
Schuyler with her parents

Schuyler's piano recitals and radio broadcasts attracted press coverage. Among her admirers was New York Mayor Fiorello LaGuardia, who visited her at home on more than one occasion. He declared June 19, 1940, "Philippa Duke Schuyler Day" at the New York World's Fair, where she performed two recitals. At nine, Schuyler became the subject of "Evening With A Gifted Child", a profile written by New Yorker correspondent Joseph Mitchell, who heard several of her early compositions. He noted that she addressed both her parents by their first names. Schuyler completed the eighth grade at the age of 11 and by the age of 14 she had composed 200 musical selections. She became the youngest member of the National Association for American Composers and Conductors in 1942.

By the time she reached adolescence, Schuyler was touring constantly in the United States and overseas. At 15, Schuyler graduated from Father Young S. J. Memorial High School, the Schola Cantorum of Pius X School of Liturgical Music. She performed with the New York Philharmonic at Lewisohn Stadium. Schuyler continued her studies at Manhattanville College. Her talent as a pianist was widely acknowledged, although many critics believed that her forte lay in playing vigorous pieces and criticized her style when tackling more nuanced works. Acclaim for her performances led to her becoming a role model for many children in the United States, but Schuyler's own childhood was blighted when, during her teenage years, her parents showed her the scrapbooks they had compiled recording her life and career. The books contained numerous newspaper clippings in which both George and Josephine Schuyler commented on their beliefs and ambitions for their daughter. Realization that she had been conceived and raised, in a sense, as a genetic experiment, robbed the pianist of many of the illusions that had made her earlier youth a happy one.

In later life, Schuyler grew disillusioned with the racial and gender prejudice she encountered, particularly when performing in the United States, and much of her musical career was spent playing overseas. She fled to Latin America, where people of mixed race were more prevalent. She chose a voluntary exile of traveling and performing in Latin America, the Caribbean, Asia, Africa and Europe. She played at the inauguration of three successive presidents in Haiti. In Africa, she performed for various notables such as Haile Selassie of Ethiopia, at Independence Day celebrations for Patrice Lumumba and Joseph Kasavubu of the Congo, President Kwame Nkrumah of Ghana, and for Albert Schweitzer in his isolated leper colony in Lamberéné. She began passing for white in 1959, at first so she could travel in South Africa, then again years later thinking she would have a better career if she reentered the American concert scene as a white performer.

=== Journalism career ===
As her concert schedule decreased in the early 1960s, Schuyler followed her father George Schuyler into journalism in her thirties. She supplemented her limited income by writing about her travels. She published more than 100 newspaper and magazine articles internationally, and was one of the few black writers for the United Press International. Schuyler published four non-fiction books: Adventures in Black and White (a memoir-travelogue, 1960); Who Killed the Congo? (a summary of the Belgian Congo's fight for independence, 1962); Jungle Saints (about Catholic missionaries, 1963); and Kingdom of Dreams (a quixotic study of scientific dream interpretation written with her mother, 1966).

== Personal life ==
Schuyler's personal life was frequently unhappy since childhood. Her mother punished her severely with whippings, and she never made friends because she did not attend school regularly. When she did attend school, she was ahead of other children her age, and was usually the only minority.

Schuyler developed an inferiority complex about her race and viewed her blackness as a "stigma". Schuyler rejected many of her parents' values and viewed their interracial marriage as a mistake. She increasingly became a vocal feminist and made many attempts to pass herself off as a woman of Ibero-American descent named Felipa Monterro y Schuyler.

Although Schuyler engaged in a number of affairs, she never married. In 1965, she endured a dangerous late-term abortion in Tijuana after an affair with the Togolese Foreign Minister at the time, Georges Apedo-Amah, because she did not want to have a child with a black man. Schuyler wanted to marry an Aryan man to boost her career and produce offspring she deemed ideal.

Schuyler and her father were members of the John Birch Society. In addition to her native English language, she spoke French, Italian, Spanish, Portuguese, and German. She was also a devout Catholic.

== Death ==
In 1966, Schuyler traveled to South Vietnam to perform for the troops and Vietnamese groups. She returned in April 1967 as a war correspondent for William Loeb's Manchester Union Leader and served as a lay missionary.

In early May, Schuyler planned to leave Vietnam, but extended her stay to bring Catholic children from Hue, where there was tension between Catholic and Buddhist factions. On May 9, 1967, she boarded a United States Army helicopter on a mission to evacuate Vietnamese orphans from Da Nang. The helicopter crashed into Da Nang Bay. She survived the crash but could not swim and drowned.

She was the second of two American women journalists to die in Vietnam. Some 2,000 mourners attended her funeral at St. Patrick's Cathedral in New York City on May 18, 1967.

== Legacy ==
Schuyler's parents established the Philippa Schuyler Memorial Foundation in her memory. Schuyler's mother was profoundly affected by her death and died by suicide a few days before the second anniversary of her death in 1969.

Philippa Schuyler Middle School for the Gifted and Talented in Bushwick, Brooklyn, New York is dedicated to preserving the memory of the child prodigy by offering an arts-focused education to New York City children.

It was reported in 2004 that Halle Berry owned the film rights to Schuyler's biography. Berry intended to co-produce the biopic with Marc Platt, starring Alicia Keys as Schuyler.

== Books ==
- Philippa Duke Schuyler, Adventures in Black and White, with foreword by Deems Taylor, (New York: R. Speller, 1960)
- Philippa Duke Schuyler, Who Killed the Congo?, (New York: Devin-Adair, 1962)
- Philippa Duke Schuyler, Jungle Saints: Africa's Heroic Catholic Missionaries, (Roma: Verlag Herder, 1963)
- Philippa Duke Schuyler and Josephine Schuyler, Kingdom of Dreams, (New York: R. Speller, 1966)
- Philippa Duke Schuyler, Good Men Die, (New York: Twin Circle, 1969)

== See also ==
- List of journalists killed and missing in the Vietnam War
