= Virginia Proctor Powell Florence =

American librarian

- Florence in 1923
- Born: October 1, 1897
- Died: April 3, 1991 (aged 93)
- Known for: first black woman in the United States to earn a degree in library science

Virginia Proctor Powell Florence (October 1, 1897 – April 3, 1991) was a trailblazer in both African-American history and the history of librarianship. In 1923 she became the first black woman in the United States to earn a degree in library science. This also made her the second African-American to be formally trained in librarianship, after Edward Christopher Williams.

== Early life and education ==
Virginia Proctor Powell Florence was the only child born to Socrates Edward and Caroline Elizabeth (Proctor) Powell on October 1, 1897, in Wilkinsburg, Pennsylvania. Powell Florence spent her early years in Wilkinsburg until both her mother and father died in 1913. At this time Powell Florence moved to Pittsburgh to live with her aunt.

After moving to Pittsburgh, Powell Florence graduated from Pittsburgh's Fifth Avenue High School in 1915. She followed in her mother's footsteps and continued her education at Oberlin College in Oberlin, Ohio. In 1919, Powell Florence earned her Bachelor of Arts degree in English literature from Oberlin and went out into the workforce. She moved back to Pittsburgh where, although having adequate training and experience, she was unable to pursue her desired goal of teaching and spent some time working at her aunt's salon as a beautician. Aware of her passion for children and books, Charles Wilbur Florence, her future husband, encouraged her to pursue a career in librarianship.

During a time when African-Americans were rarely considered for admission into predominantly white universities, Powell Florence was considered for admission into the Pittsburgh Carnegie Library School (now the University of Pittsburgh School of Information Sciences). There was much debate about allowing a black person into the program. School officials were concerned with how white students might react to having a black peer and the likelihood that Powell Florence would find work upon completion of the program was slim. No library in the Pittsburgh area had ever hired a black person with the amount of formal training Powell Florence would have after graduation. After deliberation, school officials decided to admit Powell Florence in 1922 based on her previous academic achievement at Oberlin College. Although the school had accepted her, she still had to face discrimination. She was not allowed to interact directly with the white patrons; she was instructed to allow a white patron to answer any questions patrons would have. Nevertheless, she graduated with a Bachelor of Library Science degree in 1923, after one year of library school.

== Career ==
Although Powell Florence is recognized for her place in the history of librarianship, her first few jobs did not lead her in that direction. Upon graduating from Oberlin, Powell Florence moved to St. Paul, Minnesota, to work for the YWCA as a secretary in the Girl Reserves of the Colored Girls Work Section. After only a year, Powell Florence decided St. Paul was not for her and she returned to Pittsburgh.

Upon her return to Pittsburgh, Powell Florence realized that she wanted to become a teacher. While at Oberlin, she had participated in community groups and campus literary clubs, and had a passion for working with children. Powell Florence thought the combination of her experience working with children at the YWCA and her degree in English literature would be more than adequate qualifications for her to become a teacher. Unfortunately, the Pittsburgh school system did not see her qualifications in the same light. The Pittsburgh school system had integrated the student body but they were not yet ready for black teachers to impress knowledge upon white students and therefore would not accept Powell Florence as a teacher. To her dismay, she could not find a job that she desired so she worked in her aunt’s beauty salon for two years.

Not only was it apparent to Powell Florence that working in her aunt’s salon did not fit into her career goals but it was also apparent to Charles Wilbur Florence. He did not want to see Powell Florence lose sight of her goals and was her main advocate for her pursuit of a degree in librarianship. Florence knew that Powell Florence had the right combination of academic success, determination, and a love for children and books to be triumphant in the program at the Carnegie Library School. Due to his encouragement, Powell Florence applied for the program and was accepted despite the school's apprehension about her race.

Following her graduation, Powell Florence applied to libraries across the country that seemed most likely to hire an African-American librarian. Powell Florence was hired into the New York Public Library system where she remained until 1927. After leaving the New York Public Library system, Powell Florence achieved yet another first: she became the first African-American to take and pass the New York high school librarian's examination. After completion of the test, Powell Florence was appointed librarian at Seward Park High School in Brooklyn.

On July 18, 1931, Virginia Proctor Powell and Charles Wilbur Florence were finally married. They had decided to delay marriage until this time to focus on their educations and careers. In addition to Mrs. Powell Florence’s success, Mr. Florence was quite accomplished himself. He earned undergraduate and graduate degrees from the University of Pittsburgh and spent two years at Harvard in a quest for a doctorate, however he did not complete the requirements. While in Boston, Florence was selected to become the president of Lincoln University of Missouri in Jefferson City, Missouri. After the wedding, the couple moved to Jefferson City so Florence could begin his appointment. Powell Florence took an eight-year hiatus from librarianship to take on the role of “First Lady” of Lincoln University. In Missouri, she was described as a stylish, soft-spoken librarian fond of social teas and reading clubs.

In 1938 the couple moved again to follow another career opportunity for Florence, this time in Richmond, Virginia. Powell Florence was unable to find work for herself in Richmond and decided to take a position in Washington, D.C., away from her husband. The move to Washington, D.C., allowed Powell Florence to return to librarianship where she worked at Cordoza High School until 1945. Due to health complications, Powell Florence stopped working in the Washington, D.C., school system and returned to Richmond.

Powell Florence’s health improved and allowed her to return to her career as a librarian. She worked in the Richmond school system at Maggie L. Walker Senior High School until 1965 when she retired from the field of librarianship. Although she was no longer in the work force, she and her husband remained passionate about social justice issues. Powell Florence noted in her 1968 alumni reunion class questionnaire that, "“My husband and I, being negroes, are especially interested in Civil Rights and better race relations. We work with our church, YWCA, and the Richmond Crusade for Voters toward that end.”

Virginia Proctor Powell Florence died on April 3, 1991, at the age of 93 in Richmond.

== Honors ==
Powell Florence’s contributions to librarianship were acknowledged decades after she became the first black woman in the United States to earn a degree in library science. She was honored by the University of Pittsburgh in 1981 with a Special Award for Outstanding Professional Service and again posthumously in 2004 with a plaque in the lobby of the Information Sciences Building. Additionally the American Library Association recognized her endeavors by honoring Powell Florence in their list “100 of the most important leaders we had in the 20th century,” where she was ranked number 34.

== See also ==
- List of African-American pioneers in desegregation of higher education
