= Black Empire (novel) =

Novel by George S. Schuyler

- Black Empire, Northeastern University Press
- Author: George S. Schuyler
- Language: English
- Publisher: Pittsburgh Courier
- Publication date: 1936-1938, 1991 (reissue)
- Publication place: United States

Black Empire was a tongue-in-cheek speculative fiction novel by African-American writer George S. Schuyler originally published under his pseudonym of Samuel I. Brooks. The two halves of the book originally ran as weekly serials in the Pittsburgh Courier. "Black Internationale" ran in the Courier from November 1936 to July 1937, "Black Empire" ran from October 1937 to April 1938. Combined and edited in 1991 by Robert A. Hill and R. Kent Rasmussen, editors at UCLA's Marcus Garvey Papers, the collected novel detailed the attempts of a radical African-American group called the Black Internationale, equipped with superscience and led by the charismatic Doctor Belsidus, who succeed in creating their own independent nation on the African continent. The novel is believed to be a lampoon of Marcus Garvey's Back-to-Africa movement and the Black Star Line.

"I have been greatly amused by the public enthusiasm for 'The Black Internationale,' which is hokum and hack work of the purest vein. I deliberately set out to crowd as much race chauvinism and sheer improbability into it as my fertile imagination could conjure. The result vindicates my low opinion of the human race." George S. Schuyler, "Black Empire (1936-38)".

== See also ==
- African American literature
- Africanfuturism
- Afrofuturism
