= Illustrated Feature Section =

Newspaper insert

- Type: African American Weekly Newspaper Insert
- Format: Tabloid
- Owner: William B. Ziff Company
- Editor: George Schuyler (1928–1929) Benjamin J. Davis Jr. (1929–1931) Ivy Boone (1931–1932)
- Founded: November 1928
- Ceased publication: December 1932

The Illustrated Feature Section (IFS) was a newspaper insert that was distributed to African American newspapers. It was founded by the William B. Ziff Company in November 1929. The IFS was advertised as appearing in "thirty-four of America's most prominent colored newspapers," and had a circulation of at least 185,000 in 1929. It had three editors, George Schuyler (1928–1929), Benjamin J. Davis Jr. (1929–1931), and Ivy Boone (1931–1932).

Schuyler had his editorship at the height of his journalist career, but left after a few months over issues with William Bernard Ziff Sr.'s management of the insert. Davis' editorship came at the beginning of his career, after graduating from Harvard Law School. Boone was the secretary of Carl J. Murphy, editor of the Baltimore Afro-American.

== Reception ==
Eugene Gordon, in the April 1929 edition of the Saturday Evening Quill, praised IFS for its work of to replace traditionally upheld motifs of destitution and racial antagonism, in accord with the Harlem Renaissance. He credited George Schuyler's "Instructions for Contributors" for the quality of IFS fiction. He appreciated how these rules contributed to a decentering of Black fiction from Harlem and allowing Black people from around the country to see themselves represented in fiction.

Stories must be full of human interest. Short, simple words. No attempt to parade erudition to the bewilderment of the reader. No colloquialisms such as "nigger," "darkey," "coon," etc. Plenty of dialogue, and language that is realistic.

We will not accept any stories that are depressing, saddening, or gloomy. Our people have enough troubles without reading about any. We want them to be interested, cheered, buoyed up; comforted, gladdened, and made to laugh.

Nothing that casts the least reflection on contemporary moral or sex standards will be allowed. Keep away from the erotic! Contributions must be clean and wholesome.

Everything must be written in that intimate manner that wins the reader’s confidence at once and makes him or her feel that what is written is being spoken exclusively to that particular reader.

No attempt should be made to be obviously artistic. Be artistic, of course, but “put it over” on the reader so he or she will be unaware of it.

Stores must be swiftly moving, gripping the interest and sweeping on to a climax. The heroine should always be beautiful and desirable, sincere and virtuous. The hero should be of the he-man type, but not stiff, stereotyped or vulgar. The villain should obviously be a villain of the deepest-dyed variety: crafty, unscrupulous, suave, and resourceful. Above all, however, these characters must live and breathe, and be just ordinary folks such as the reader has met. The heroine should be of the brown-skin type.

All matter should deal exclusively with Negro life. Nothing will be permitted that is likely to engender ill feeling between blacks and whites. The color problem is bad enough without adding any fuel to the fire.

These instructions were criticized by Henry Louis Gates Jr., who claimed they were incompatible with the oral form of African-American storytelling.

== Controversy ==
The Illustrated Feature Section was accused of filling Black newspapers with "sex and luck advertisements" by the Chicago Whip in the Spring of 1929. The insert was also criticized for because it was owned by white people rather than the community that it served. These issues came to a head when the Pittsburgh Courier ended its relationship with IFS.

Jefferson Davis Jr. claimed in a memoir that Ziff created the insert as a part of a scheme to create a Black Associated Press and require that any paper that used the insert employ the William B. Ziff Company as its advertising agents in order for the advertising company to take 30–50 percent of the advertising revenue. The realization that Ziff hired him because of the trust the African American press had for his father Benjamin Davis Sr., who owned and edited the Atlanta Independent, led him to leave his position as editor.
