= Black No More =

1931 American Harlem Renaissance novel

- Author: George S. Schuyler
- Language: English
- Genre: Satire, Afrofuturism
- Publisher: New York, Macaulay Co.
- Publication date: 1931
- Media type: Print
- Pages: 250
- OCLC: 5760472
- Dewey Decimal: 813'.52--dc21

Black No More: Being an Account of the Strange and Wonderful Workings of Science in the Land of the Free, A.D. 1933-1940 is a 1931 Harlem Renaissance satire on American race relations by George S. Schuyler. In the novel, Schuyler targets both the Ku Klux Klan and NAACP in condemning the ways in which race functions as both an obsession and a commodity in early twentieth-century America. The central premise of the novel is that an African American scientist invents a process that can transform Black people into white people. Those who have internalized white racism, those who are tired of inferior opportunities socially and economically, and those who simply want to expand their sexual horizons, undergo the procedure. As the country "whitens", the economic importance of racial segregation in the South as a means of maintaining elite white economic and social status becomes increasingly apparent, as the South relies on Black labor through sharecropping.

The novel is known not only for its satiric bite and inventive plot machinations, but also for its focus on racially motivated economic injustice and the caricatures of prominent figures of the American 1920s including W. E. B. Du Bois, Marcus Garvey, James Weldon Johnson, Madam C. J. Walker and others. The novel represents a cornerstone of the New Negro Movement in its transformative discussion of the aesthetic and cultural traditions present in African American art, in which the social concept of Blackness is challenged. It is included in the 2011 Library of America collection "Harlem Renaissance: Four Novels of the 1930s".

Black No More's aspects of science fiction regarding the sanitarium, and the issues it tackles regarding race relations and depictions of issues people of color face, put the novel under the umbrella of Afrofuturism. Black No More is one of the first novels written in this genre defined by the term coined by Mark Dery 60 years later.

== Black No More and Afrofuturism ==
The novel's use of technology literally through the sanitarium, and more abstractly through its satirical languages to create an alternate social reality, are Afrofuturistic in their presentation. Black No More was published the same year, 1931, as Schuyler's novel about forced labor and Americo-Liberian relations with indigenous tribes Slavery Today; A Liberian Story.

As an Afrofuturistic work, the novel satirically showcases the racial impacts of assimilation, along with satirizing a potential future, in which the Jim Crow era policies would have been buried through eugenic assimilation. The novel begins with a satirical dedication to those who claim to lack any African American genes, whilst also detailing a Japanese procedure which claims to have the capability of lightening skin, contextualizing the alternate social reality through the inevitability of racial mixing as a product of being human. Such dedications are included as forms of satire to mock the concepts of "race changing," but also to inform the reader of the absurdist style of the work's rooting in reality.

== Plot ==
=== Preface ===
In the preface, Schuyler surveys contemporary eugenics practices of the 1920s and 1930s such as skin whitening and hair straightening marketed to Black Americans. The ensuing satire critiques such concepts.

=== Story ===
The novel begins at a speakeasy in Harlem on New Year's Eve, where protagonist Max Disher's romantic advances are rejected by a white woman solely because he is Black. The following morning, he reads about a Black doctor's new scientific procedure for turning Black skin white called "Black-No-More," and he decides to go through with the procedure, being the first to do so. As Max sees his face broadcast on the news for undergoing the procedure, he expresses concern, until remembering that he is now unrecognizable due to now being white.

As the Black-No-More procedure grows increasingly popular, it wreaks havoc on the social and economic institutions of Harlem, drawing resistance from leaders in the African American community. It also draws fierce resistance from Southern segregationist organizations, as the Southern economy rooted in Black labor collapses. Meanwhile, Max — who has now changed his name to Matthew Fisher — discovers that life as a white man is not as great as he imagined, with economic struggles remaining a constant in his life. In order to earn some money, he travels to Atlanta, Georgia, and joins Reverend Harry Givens's white supremacist organization, The Knights of Nordica, claiming that he has the anthropological expertise necessary to help them end Black-No-More.

Incidentally, the woman who rejected Matthew at the beginning of the novel is Rev. Givens's daughter, Helen. Now that he is white and a prominent member of a white supremacist organization, Matthew wins Helen's affection and, eventually, her hand in marriage. This becomes dangerous for Matthew, however, when Helen becomes pregnant, raising the specter — faced by an increasing number of newly whitened individuals — of a non-white child betraying his true identity.

The Knights of Nordica break into politics, teaming up with the well-funded Anglo-Saxon Association, whose leader, Arthur Snobbcraft, shares the Democratic presidential ticket with Rev. Givens. With fewer and fewer Black individuals left for Snobbcraft and Givens to stake their racist positions against, they hire a statistician, Dr. Samuel Buggerie, to conduct a massive inquiry into the genealogy of American citizens and thereby taint their opponents as genealogically, if not epidermically, "Black."

After a miscarriage, Helen becomes pregnant again, prompting Matthew to keep an airplane and spare cash on hand for a quick escape whenever she happens to go into labor. He decides that, when she gives birth to what will inevitably be their Black child, he will ask her either to reject him outright, or to accept him for who he is and leave the country with him. However, with the genealogy project nearing completion on the eve of election day, the results indicate that almost all Americans have at least some African ancestry, including Snobbcraft, Buggerie, Givens, and Helen. These results are stolen by the Republicans and then leaked to the media. When Helen's child is born biracial, she blames herself for her undisclosed African-American heritage. Matthew then admits his own heritage, and she accepts him for who he is.

A violent mob forms when word spreads of Givens's and Snobbcraft's "impure" ancestry. Snobbcraft and Buggerie flee together on Matthew's airplane, but they are forced to land in Mississippi when they run out of fuel. Afraid of revealing their true identities, they blacken their faces with shoe-polish, which proves to be an unfortunate decision, as they encounter a group of local zealots who have been eagerly waiting for a Black person — any Black person — to kill. Givens and Snobbcraft remove their disguises and convince the zealots that they are, in fact, white, but just at this moment a newspaper arrives, divulging their true ancestry. Snobbcraft and Buggerie are mutilated and then burned alive.

In a flash-forward, Dr. Crookman, the creator of the Black-No-More procedure, announces that Black Americans who undergo the procedure appear lighter, which results in those with light skin facing discrimination, and having a darker skin tone becoming increasingly desired. As a result, both Black and white Americans begin staining their skin with the product "Zulu Tan" to appear darker. The novel closes on a picture of Max and Helen's family, in which all are dark-skinned.

== Critical reception ==
=== Jane Kuenz ===
When George Schuyler's Black No More appeared in early 1931, it entered a culture primed for its reception by more than three decades of apprehensive and contradictory public fulmination, posing as and often passing for a reasoned debate, on the subject of racial essences and their relation to national character. In his spoof on Harlem's Talented Tenth; of the stock themes, incidents, and characters peopling their work; of W.E.B Du Bois (Dr. Shakespeare Agamemnon Beard, later Dr. Karl von Beerde, editor of the Dilemma) and the NAACP ...

=== Treva D. Lindsey ===
At the core of the New Negro Movement was a desire for a re-creation of self, both individually and collectively. New Negroes acted upon this desire for re-creation through reconfiguring aesthetic and cultural traditions. African Americans engaged in new practices and aesthetic discourses with an unprecedented sense of possibility for self-determination and autonomy. Through the altering, adorning, and maintenance of physical appearance, African Americans could literally reconstruct and refashion themselves and create new models of black aesthetic identity. Aesthetic practices were integral to African Americans in shedding the vestiges of enslavement and for asserting their place within the modern world.

=== Sonnet H. Retman ===
The scientific invention of Black-No-More harnesses performance and mechanically reproductive technologies to the making of race, thereby usurping the racialized function of maternal labor (Mullen 77). Through this invention, Schuyler's masculine protagonist capitalizes as a highly commercial, free-floating sign: while passing for white, he sells blackness and whiteness for personal gain. Tracking a series of financial transactions in the novel that center on race, I argue the Black No More illuminates new market possibilities for the trade of racial property in commodity form during the Fordist era.

== Legacy ==
Black No More aligns with Schuyler's long held sentiments towards race in America, which argue against the concepts of a color line rooted in exaggerating and demeaning African American culture. Black No More satirizes such a concept by presenting the discourse of the color line in a way which showcases bigotry regardless of the presence of race in society.

Schuyler's legacy as one with a strict condemnation of the color line is shown through a work that is intent on satirizing the societal gap of race itself, one which contemporaries such as W. E. B. Du Bois embrace. DuBois begrudgingly endorsed the work, as it addresses the concept of race and its impact on economic stature as he had written. Black No More is the centerpiece of Schuyler's legacy, with its satire reflecting his attitude against the color line and its usage in art as a form of segregating the difference between Black and white Americans. Black No More and Schuyler remain controversial for their criticism of Black leaders, with their satiric bite being viewed as offensive or overlooked in regards to contributions to art during the Harlem Renaissance.

== Adaptation ==
The novel is in the public domain as its copyright was not renewed by 1959.

In 2018, Tantor Media published an audiobook edition, featuring voice actor Sean Crisden.

In early 2020, The New Group announced it was developing a musical adaptation of Black No More directed by Scott Elliott with a book by John Ridley and choreography by Bill T. Jones. Rapper Black Thought contributed music and lyrics and appeared in the production, which was originally scheduled to premiere in October 2020. The production ran from January to February 2022. The Off-Broadway production has faced criticism for its deviation from Schuyler's satire, with its musical numbers facing criticism for tonal dissonance from their source.

In 2022, The New York Times published several articles reviewing the musical, including "The Evolution of Black Music, and a Man’s Soul, in One Show" and "Review: In Black No More, Race Is Skin Deep, but Racism Isn’t".

== Publication history ==
- 1931 1st ed
- 1969 reprint OCLC 000014802
- 1971 reprint
- 1989 reprint ISBN 1-55553-063-X
- 1999 reprint ISBN 0-375-75380-X
- 2011 reprint ISBN 978-0486480404
- 2011 Harlem Renaissance Novels collection ISBN 978-1598531060
- 2021 Penguin Classics ISBN 9780241505724
