= Chandler Owen =

Black American writer, editor and activist (1889–1967)

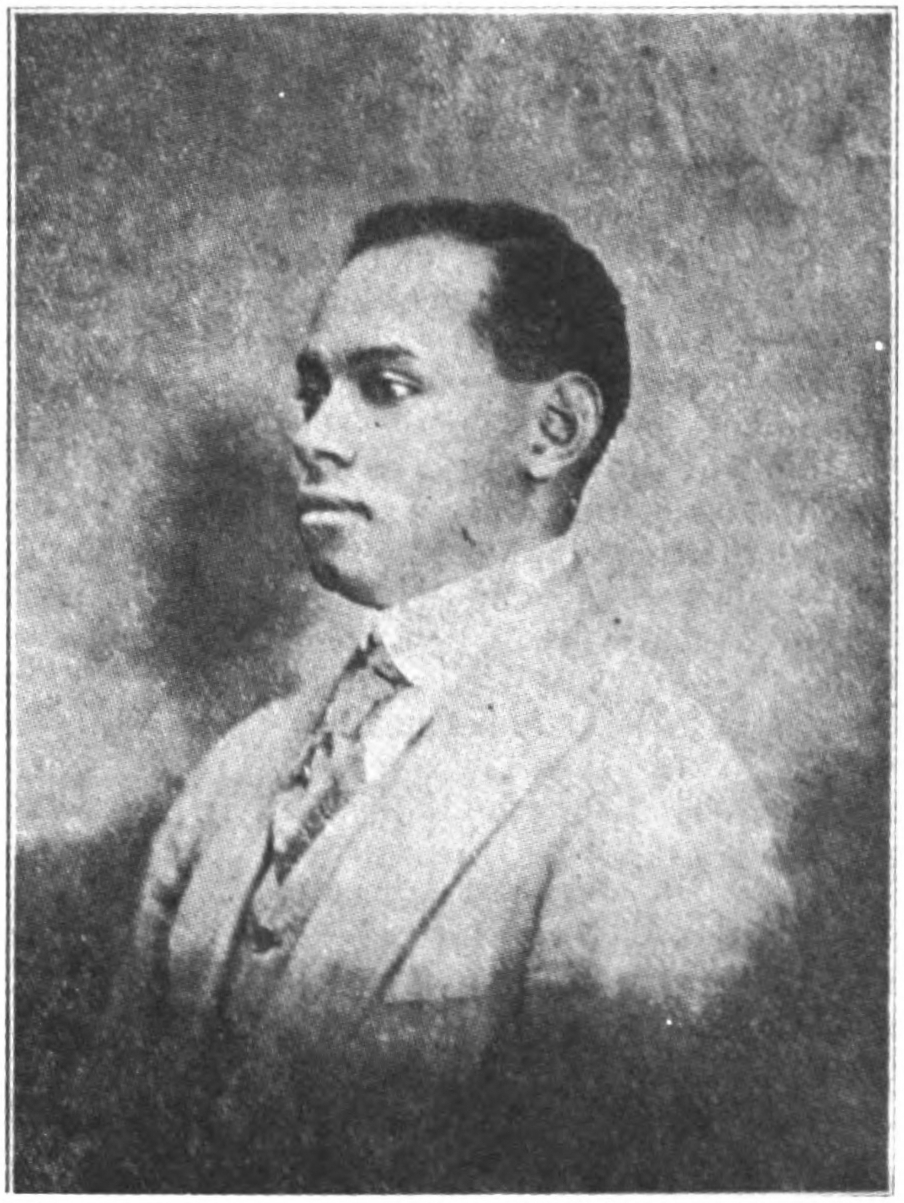
- Owen c. 1917
- Born: April 5, 1889; Warrenton, North Carolina, U.S.
- Died: November 2, 1967 (aged 78)
- Occupation: Writer
- Political party: Socialist (before 1920s); Republican (after 1920s)

Chandler Owen (April 5, 1889 – November 2, 1967) was an African-American writer, editor and early member of the Socialist Party of America. Born in North Carolina, he studied and worked in New York City, then moved to Chicago for much of his career. He established his own public relations company in Chicago and wrote speeches for candidates and presidents including Thomas Dewey, Dwight D. Eisenhower, and Lyndon B. Johnson.

== Biography ==
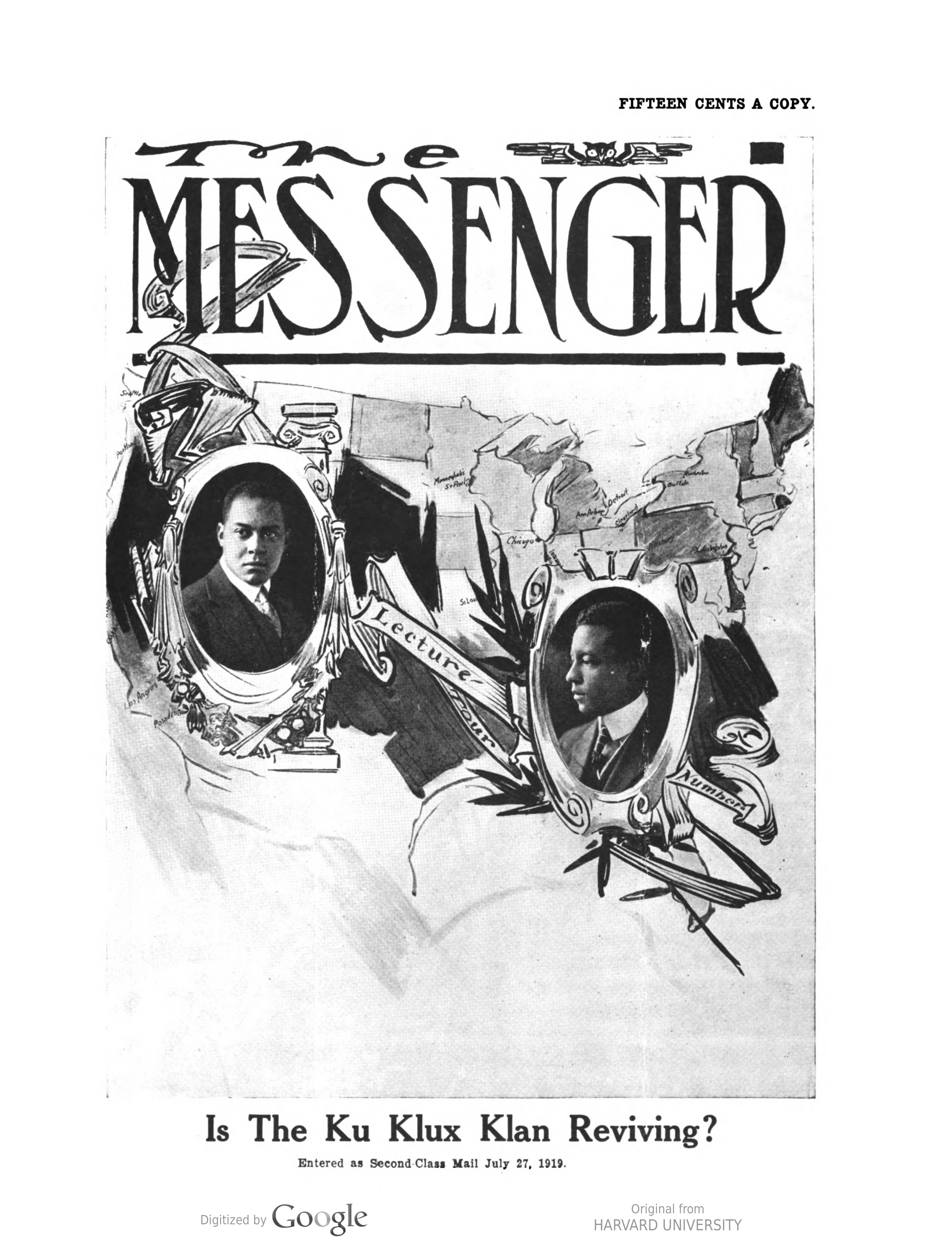
Owen (left) and A. Philip Randolph on the cover of The Messenger, February 1922

Owen was born in Warrenton, North Carolina, in 1889. He graduated from Virginia Union University in 1913. Later, while studying economics at Columbia University in 1916, he joined the Socialist Party of America. He began a lifelong friendship with A. Philip Randolph and together they followed the lead of radical activist Hubert Harrison. They soon became known in Harlem as "Lenin" (Owen) and "Trotsky" (Randolph). The two started a journal in 1917, called The Messenger, which published leading literary and political writers. Soon after, while Owen was running for the New York State Assembly, he and Randolph were jailed, where they were mocked and treated cruelly for their Socialist affiliations.

== Founding of The Messenger ==
See main article The Messenger (magazine).

The Messenger made a name for itself during WWI as the nation's leading African-American magazine and would be voice of the New Negro. Owen and Randolph, publishers of The Messenger, became Socialist Party members in the late 1916, calling for anti-racist working class solidarity on the streets of Harlem. Published in 1917, The Messenger was not just a journal, it also served as the heart of Harlem's socialist community and served as a platform for black intellectuals such as Wilfred A. Domingo, Wallace Thurman, and George Frazier Miller. Randolph and Owen welcomed the arrival of "The New Negros" whose goal was to wage a tireless battle against radical discrimination and working class exploitation. U.S. attorney described The Messenger's radicalism as "The most able and the most dangerous of all the negro publications." Three veterans who played a role in the production of The Messenger and its orientation were Victor Daly, William N. Colson, and George S. Schuyler.

== Tensions with Marcus Garvey ==
Chandler Owen urged the Department of Justice to bring Marcus Garvey of the Universal Negro Improvement Association to an early trial on an indictment returned in connection with Garvey's management of the Black Star Line's funds. The meeting listened to a denunciation of Garvey's career. The chief speaker, Owen, mentioned the libel suit that Garvey had recently filed against him and a number of newspapers. He stated that he would have been happy to repeat the lines that were complained about if the bill of complaint had been included with the lawsuit. His reinforced utterances, he said, might cause Garvey to sue "for a million dollars every day next week.

In The Messenger, Owen writes an article titled "Should Marcus Garvey Be Deported?", where Owen starts off by saying one is less concerned about the legal action than the aspects of the question. The law on the question of deportation is so broad and elastic that an alien may be deported for almost any slight offense-with or without cause. He adds no one in America except the radicals and liberals ever questions the right of deportation anyway. It is a mistake to believe that radicals and liberals of any school are opposed to deportation under any and all circumstances.

Owen goes on to talk about how he favors the conviction and imprisonment of Marcus Garvey and his deportation immediately after he serves his sentence. He adds that Marcus Garvey is an anarchist in the truest sense of the word, he says, and his removal would be accordance with a true and non-strained interpretation of the law. Owen says that Garvey's mockery of the race has had an impact on the streets of Harlem. He has denounced and berated every notable African American leader in the United States, both past and current, because he is resentful of criticism for his arrogant and meaningless plans. For thirty pieces of silver and a mess of pottage, Garvey attempted to sell the rights of American Negroes to a murder-graft-bund organization.

Owen says that because of his foolish antics and clown tactics, Marcus Garvey is embarrassing American and West Indian Negroes, and all respectable, self-respecting Negroes in America, both local and foreign, have declared that "Marcus Garvey Must Go!" as a result. White folks think he speaks for us. Nothing is more detached from reality. All intellectual Negroes, even the less intelligent ones, are embarrassed that such a moron is claiming to be their leader. They want to be obvious that the U.N.I.A. representative only harbors animosity for the most ignorant West Indian and American Negroes, along with a few schemers from both groups who revolve around the treasury and prey like hawks on the profits of guillible fanatics and dumb Negro dupes.

Owen concludes the article by stating that Marcus Garvey must go since the die has been cast. It is the duty of every self-respecting Negro to save the race from the shame of the Black Kluxer. He adds Garvey must get out of Negro life everywhere. There is no place in America for a black race baiter, one time reviling all white men; and a "good nigger" race traitor, at another time selling out the rights of all Negroes.

After Garvey met in secret with Ku Klux Klan leader Edward Young Clarke in June 1922, the "Garvey Must Go" Campaign gained traction. The following day, a story titled "Marcus Garvey! The Black Imperial Wizard Becomes Messenger Boy of the White Klu Klux Kleagle" appeared in Randolph & Owen's magazine The messenger.

In 1923, Garvey was found guilty of mail fraud. In February 1925, he was sentenced to nearly three years of a five-year sentence at the Atlanta Federal Penitentiary. Garvey would also be deported from the US in 1927 and never come back.

Owen moved to Chicago, Illinois, shortly thereafter and found himself quickly enlightened with socialistic views. He became managing editor of the Chicago Bee, a major African-American publication, and continued to back Randolph in his efforts to unionize Pullman porters on the railroads. With his mounting career success, Owen went on to establish his own public relations company. He remained interested in politics and wrote many speeches for politicians such as Wendell Willkie, Thomas Dewey, and even for US presidents Dwight Eisenhower and Lyndon B. Johnson.

In the 1920s, Owen became a Republican. He would later run unsuccessfully for a seat in the United States House of Representatives. For the remainder of his life, he worked in public relations and continue to write speeches.

Ahead of the 1935 Chicago mayoral election, Owen supported Paul H. Douglas's effort to run for mayor atop a "Chicago Fusion" municipal ticket. However, the ticket ultimately failed to submit petitions with the 56,000 signatures required to appear on the ballot.

== Active in the 1940s ==
Owen was involved in the Republican Party and continued to shift to the right direction throughout the 1930s and World War II. He was the Negro division's publicity chairman and wordsmith for Wendell Willkie's 1940 presidential campaign. Owen also wrote about black anti-Semitism for the Anti-Defamation League of B'nai B'rith. He wrote the Office of War Information's pamphlet Negroes and the War (1942), a tabloid-sized publication that praised the New Deal, and predicted that black people would receive worse treatment if Hitler won.

Suffering from terminal kidney disease, Owen wrote a last letter to Philip Randolph saying, ..."Our long friendship, never soiled, is nearing its close. I've been in pain. If you were not living, I would commit suicide today." Owen died soon after in November 1967.

Like Harrison, Owen was an atheist. In a 1919 issue of The Messenger he and Randolph wrote, "We don't thank God for anything... our Deity is the toiling masses of the world and the things for which we thank are their achievement."

== Electoral history ==
Illinois's 1st congressional district Republican primary, 1928
Party	Candidate	Votes	%
Republican	Martin B. Madden (incumbent)	22,427	68.15
Republican	William L. Dawson	9,424	28.64
Republican	George J. Witt	541	1.64
Republican	Chandler Owen	315	0.96
Republican	T. W. Shavers	200	0.61
Total votes		32,907	100.0

Illinois's 1st congressional district Republican primary, 1934
Party	Candidate	Votes	%
Republican	Oscar DePriest (incumbent)	18,054	94.58
Republican	Chandler Owen	1,034	5.42
Total votes		19,088	100.0

== Sources ==
- Banks, W. M. Black Intellectuals: Race and Responsibility in American Life, New York: W. W. Norton & Company, 1996.
