= George Schuyler =

American author (1895–1977)

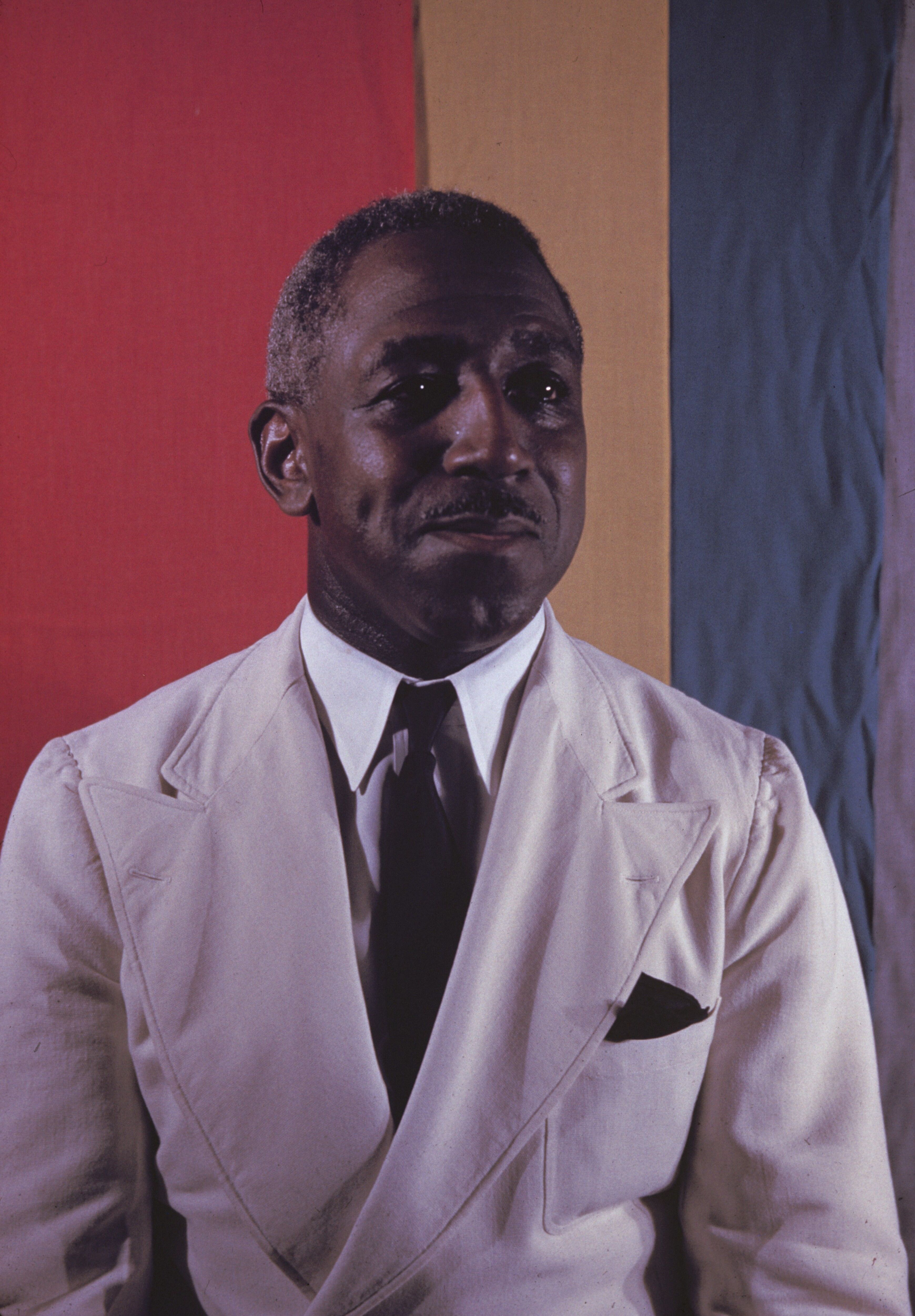
- Portrait by Carl Van Vechten, 1941
- Born: George Samuel Schuyler; February 25, 1895; Providence, Rhode Island, U.S.
- Died: August 31, 1977 (aged 82); Pittsburgh, Pennsylvania, U.S.
- Occupations: Journalist; columnist; author; novelist; social critic
- Spouse: Josephine Lewis Cogdell (m. 1928; died 1969)
- Children: 2, including Philippa

George Samuel Schuyler (/ˈskaɪlər/; February 25, 1895 – August 31, 1977) was an American writer, journalist, and social commentator. Known for his outspoken political conservatism and acerbic wit, he was frequently compared with his friend H.L. Mencken. Schuyler began his career in the early 1920s within the progressive black political mainstream as a popular columnist, but maintained a contrarian, maverick position on many contemporary black developments, including the Harlem Renaissance. He became increasingly conservative over the following decades, eventually becoming a Bircher and resolute opponent of the Civil Rights Movement. Alienated from the black mainstream, he died in relative obscurity in 1977. He was the father of noted pianist and journalist Philippa Schuyler.

== Early life ==
George Samuel Schuyler was born in Providence, Rhode Island, to George Francis Schuyler, a chef, and Eliza Jane Schuyler (née Fischer). Schuyler's paternal great-grandfather was believed to be a black soldier working for general Philip Schuyler, whose surname the soldier adopted. Schuyler's maternal great-grandmother was an ethnic-Malagasy servant who married a ship captain from Saxe-Coburg in Bavaria.

Schuyler's father died when he was young. George spent his early years in Syracuse, New York, where his mother moved their family after she remarried. In 1912, Schuyler, at the age of 17, enlisted in the U.S. Army and was promoted to the rank of First Lieutenant, serving in Seattle and Hawaii. During World War I he was assigned to Camp Dix, New Jersey, and later Camp Meade, Maryland, where he was put in charge of drilling new recruits, before being honorably discharged after the war ended.

== Socialist beginnings ==
After his discharge, Schuyler moved to New York City, where he worked as a handyman, doing odd jobs. During this period, he read many books which sparked his interest in socialism. He lived for a period in the Phyllis Wheatley Hotel, run by Black nationalist Marcus Garvey's Universal Negro Improvement Association (UNIA) and attended UNIA meetings. Schuyler dissented from Garvey's philosophy, and began writing about his own perspectives.

Although not fully comfortable with socialist thought, Schuyler engaged himself in a circle of socialist friends, including the Black socialist group Friends of Negro Freedom. This connection led to his employment by A. Philip Randolph and Chandler Owen's magazine, The Messenger, the group's journal. Schuyler's column, "Shafts and Darts: A Page of Calumny and Satire", came to the attention of Ira F. Lewis, manager of the Pittsburgh Courier, which was one of the leading African American newspapers in the United States. In 1924, Schuyler accepted an offer from the Courier to author a weekly column.

== Early career ==
=== Writing ===
By the mid-1920s, Schuyler had become disillusioned with socialism, believing that socialists were frauds who actually cared very little about Black people. Schuyler's writing caught the eye of journalist and social critic H. L. Mencken, who wrote, "I am more and more convinced that [Schuyler] is the most competent editorial writer now in practice in this great free republic." Schuyler contributed ten articles to the American Mercury during Mencken's tenure as editor, all dealing with Black issues, and all notable for Schuyler's wit and incisive analysis. Because of his close association with Mencken, as well as their compatible ideologies and sharp use of satire, Schuyler during this period was often referred to as "the Black Mencken."

In 1926, the Pittsburgh Courier sent Schuyler on an editorial assignment to the South, where he developed his journalistic protocol: ride with a cab driver, then chat with a local barber, bellboy, landlord, and policeman. These encounters would precede interviews with local town officials. In 1926, Schuyler became the Chief Editorial Writer at the Courier. That year, he published a controversial article entitled "The Negro-Art Hokum" in The Nation, in which he claimed that because blacks have been influenced by Euroamerican culture for 300 years, "the Aframerican is merely a lampblacked Anglo-Saxon" and that no distinctly "negro" style of art exists in the USA. Langston Hughes's "The Negro Artist and the Racial Mountain", a response to Schuyler's piece, appeared in the same magazine. Schuyler objected to the segregation of art by race, writing about a decade after his "Negro-Art Hokum" in an essay that appeared in The Courier in 1936: "All of this hullabaloo about the Negro Renaissance in art and literature did stimulate the writing of some literature of importance which will live. The amount, however, is very small, but such as it is, it is meritorious because it is literature and not Negro literature. It is judged by literary and not by racial standards, which is as it should be."

From 1928 to early 1929, Schuyler edited the Illustrated Feature Section, a newspaper insert sponsored by William Bernard Ziff Sr. with distribution of approximately 300,000 copies.

In 1929, Schuyler's pamphlet Racial Inter-Marriage in the United States called for solving the country's race problem through miscegenation, which was then illegal in most states.

In 1931, Schuyler published Black No More, which tells the story of a scientist who develops a process that turns black people to white, a book that has since been reprinted twice. Two of Schuyler's targets in the book were Christianity and organized religion, reflecting his innate skepticism of both. His mother had been religious but not a regular churchgoer. As Schuyler aged, he held both white and black churches in contempt. Both, in his mind, contained ignorant, conniving preachers who exploited their listeners for personal gain. White Christianity was viewed by Schuyler as pro-slavery and pro-racism. In an article for the American Mercury entitled Black America Begins to Doubt, Schuyler wrote: "On the horizon loom a growing number of iconoclasts and Atheists, young black men and women who can read, think and ask questions; and who impertinently demand to know why Negroes should revere a god that permits them to be lynched, Jim-Crowed, and disenfranchised".

He also positively reviewed Georg Brandes' book Jesus: A Myth in an article called "Disrobing Superstition." In his review, Schuyler states:

It is doubtful whether any intelligent person accepts the Jesus Christ of the Scriptures as a fact. His alleged exploits, career, death and resurrection can only be wholly swallowed by the same gullible folk who swarm into the sideshows at Coney Island; who believe that George Washington never told a lie; that Congressmen are exceptionally honorable; that the YMCA is something other than a training school for young babbits, or that the common people rule this country. The reviewer ditched this Jesus Myth about the same time that he threw Santa Claus overboard; i.e., at the age of eight.

Between 1936 and 1938 Schuyler published in the Pittsburgh Courier a weekly serial, which was later collected and published as a novel entitled Black Empire in 1991. He also published the highly controversial book Slaves Today: A Story of Liberia, a novel about the slave trade created by former American slaves who settled Liberia in the 1820s.

In the 1930s, Schuyler published scores of short stories in the Pittsburgh Courier under various pseudonyms. He was published in many prestigious black journals, including Negro Digest, The Messenger, and W.E.B. Du Bois's The Crisis, for which he served as business manager between 1937 and 1944. Schuyler's journalism also appeared in such mainstream magazines as The Nation and Common Ground, and in such newspapers as The Washington Post and The New York Evening Post (forerunner of the New York Post).

=== Political activity ===
In 1930, Schuyler was, along with Ella Baker, a co-founder of the Young Negroes' Cooperative League (YNCL), a consumer's and worker's cooperative organization which hoped to unite the African diaspora in the U.S. and the Caribbean in a "co-operative democracy". The League had over two dozen chapters in the U.S. and several affiliate credit unions in the West Indies, and had definite affinities with anarchism, an ideology ascribed by scholars to Schuyler at this point of his life. While the original chapter was in Harlem, chapters operated autonomously in forming buyer's clubs, credit unions, co-op stores, and, eventually, cooperative factories. Schuyler imposed a strict age limit on membership, restricting it to those between 16 and 36, effectively giving the organization an expiry date should it fail to continuously recruit new members. Schuyler and Baker wrote and spoke extensively on behalf of the YNCL, but its membership never broke 1,000 and the League shut down operations in 1937.

In 1932, Schuyler joined Roy Wilkins of the NAACP on a trip to Mississippi to inspect the working conditions of black laborers employed in flood mitigation following the Great Flood of 1927. Afterwards, he joined the organization's publicity department, compiling a history of the organization and eventually joining The Crisis.

== "Race to the right" ==
By the late 1930s, Schuyler was moving away from his previous socialist views and his columns at the Pittsburgh Courier became increasingly critical of the Roosevelt administration. Schuyler was one of a few prominent African Americans to oppose FDR's internment of Japanese Americans. He dismissed accusations that Japanese Americans presented any genuine national security threat. Schuyler warned African Americans that “if the Government can do this to American citizens of Japanese ancestry, then it can do this to American citizens of ANY ancestry...Their fight is our fight." For many of the same reasons, Schuyler, who was investigated by the FBI because of his columns, condemned the Sedition Trial of 1944 of thirty right wing critics of Roosevelt. If these defendants were prosecuted for their views, he charged, "then who is safe? I may be nabbed for speaking harshly about Brother Stimson’s treatment of Negro lads in the Army."

In 1947, he published The Communist Conspiracy against the Negroes. His conservatism was a counterpoint to the predominant liberal philosophy of the civil rights movement in the 1960s and 1970s. In 1964, Schuyler wrote a controversial opinion column in the ultraconservative Manchester Union Leader that opposed Martin Luther King Jr.'s being awarded the Nobel Peace Prize. He wrote, "Dr. King's principal contribution to world peace has been to roam the country like some sable Typhoid Mary, infecting the mentally disturbed with perversions of Christian doctrine, and grabbing fat lecture fees from the shallow-pated."

Schuyler opposed the Civil Rights Act of 1964. While acknowledging that white discrimination against blacks was "morally wrong, nonsensical, unfair, un-Christian and cruelly unjust", he opposed federal action to coerce changes in public attitudes. "New countries have a passion for novelty," he wrote, "and a country like America, which grew out of conquest, immigration, revolution and civil war, is prone to speed social change by law, or try to do so, on the assumption that by such legerdemain it is possible to make people better by force." Despite the inherent unfairness of racial discrimination, he considered federal intrusion into private affairs an infringement on individual liberty, explaining that "it takes lots of time to change social mores, especially with regard to such hardy perennials as religion, race and nationality, to say nothing of social classes."

In 1964, he ran for the United States House of Representatives in New York's 18th congressional district on the Conservative Party ticket and endorsed Republican candidate Barry Goldwater for president. The Courier's leadership disallowed Schuyler's title of associate editor. A formal refutation was communicated in a letter to the editor of the New York Times, signed by Courier Associate Publisher and Editor Percival L. Prattis, who had been a long-time friend since the 1920s.

In 1961, while still at the Courier, Schuyler began defending the John Birch Society (JBS). After he was forced out of the Courier, he came into the orbit of the society, joining the Society's speakers bureau in March 1965. It would take some months before Schuyler was personally offered membership in the Society by chairman Robert Welch, which he would accept in October. Between 1965 and 1970, Schuyler gave 69 speeches on the behalf of the Society, often concerning perceived links between the Civil Rights Movement and communism. Although Schuyler enjoyed cordial relations with the Society's leadership, he was conspicuously absent from JBS stages in the south, in no small part owing to his mixed-race marriage. He also frequently clashed with JBS leadership due to his views on race. Regardless, Schuyler's participation in the Society only worsened his pariah status within the black political scene: Jackie Robinson, who occasionally aligned himself with conservative causes, compared Schuyler to Judas, and the NAACP, his former employer, picketed his speeches. Although he would stop giving speeches in 1970, he continued writing for JBS publications until 1976.

In the 1960s, Schuyler, who had earlier supported the rights of Black South Africans, was led by his anticommunism to oppose taking any action against South African apartheid, saying in a radio broadcast, "In South Africa you have a system of apartheid. That's their business. I don't think it's the business of other people to change their society."

Outlets for Schuyler's written work diminished until he was a more obscure figure by the time of his death in 1977. As the liberal black writer Ishmael Reed notes in his introduction to a 1999 republication of Black No More, Schuyler's 1931 race satire, in the final years of Schuyler's life, it was considered taboo in black circles even to interview the aging writer.

He wrote a syndicated column (1965–1977) for the North American Newspaper Alliance.

Schuyler's autobiography, Black and Conservative, was published in 1966.

== Influence ==
In 1973 writers Ishmael Reed and Steve Cannon interviewed Schuyler about his career and controversy for Reed's publication Yardbird II.

== Family ==
Schuyler married Josephine Lewis Cogdell, a liberal white Texan heiress and writer, in 1928. Their daughter, Philippa Schuyler (1931–1967), was a child prodigy and noted concert pianist, who later followed in her father's footsteps and embarked on a career in journalism. In 1967 Phillipa was killed on an assignment in Vietnam for the Manchester Union Leader. Josephine Schuyler died by suicide two years later.

== Selected writings ==
- Slaves Today: A Story of Liberia, 1931
- Black No More: Being an Account of the Strange and Wonderful Workings of Science in the Land of the Free, A.D. 1933–1940, 1931
- Devil Town: An Enthralling Story of Tropical Africa (novella; published pseudonymously in the Pittsburgh Courier, June–July 1933)
- Golden Gods: A Story of Love, Intrigue and Adventure in African Jungles (novella; published pseudonymously in the Pittsburgh Courier, December 1933 – February 1934)
- The Beast of Bradhurst Avenue: A Gripping Tale of Adventure in the Heart of Harlem (novella; published pseudonymously in the Pittsburgh Courier, March–May 1934)
- Strange Valley (novella; published pseudonymously in the Pittsburgh Courier, August–November 1934)
- Black Empire, 1936–38, 1993 (originally published pseudonymously in the Pittsburgh Courier in serial form as two separate works under the titles "The Black Internationale" and "Black Empire")
- Ethiopian Stories, 1995 (originally published pseudonymously in the Pittsburgh Courier in serial form as two separate works entitled "The Ethiopian Murder Mystery" and "Revolt in Ethiopia")
- Black and Conservative: the Autobiography of George Schuyler, Arlington House, 1966. ASIN: B000O66XD8
- Rac(e)ing to the Right: Selected Essays of George S. Schuyler, 2001

== See also ==
- African American
- African American culture
- African American history
- Africanfuturism
- Afrofuturism
- American literature
- List of African-American writers
- Black conservatism in the United States
