= The Messenger (magazine) =

African-American literary magazine

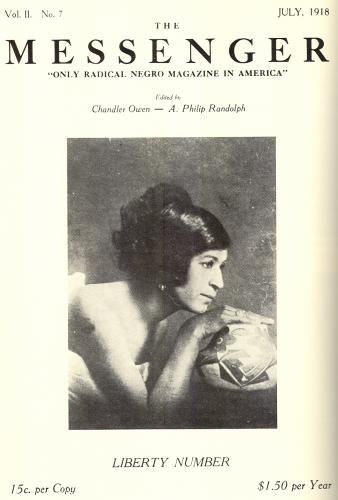
- Cover of the July 1918 issue
- Frequency: Monthly
- First issue: 1917
- Final issue: 1928
- Country: United States
- Based in: New York City
- Language: English

The Messenger was an early 20th-century political and literary magazine by and for African-American people in the United States. It was important to the emergence of the Harlem Renaissance and initially promoted a socialist political view. The Messenger was co-founded in New York City by Chandler Owen and A. Philip Randolph in August 1917. Popular writers for the magazine included Zora Neale Hurston, Langston Hughes, and Claude Mckay.

After 1920, The Messenger featured more articles about black culture and began to publish rising black writers. It became a literary magazine (similar to The Little Review, the revived The Dial, and The Liberator), contributing to the Harlem Renaissance. It was notable for helping strengthen African-American intellectual and political identity in the age of Jim Crow. Through the 1920s, The Messenger also noted the success of blacks who were reaching the middle class in business and the professions, publishing a series of essays known as "These 'Colored' United States", submitted by writers across the country. "These 'Colored' United States" was edited by Tom Lutz and Susanna Ashton.

== Early foundings ==
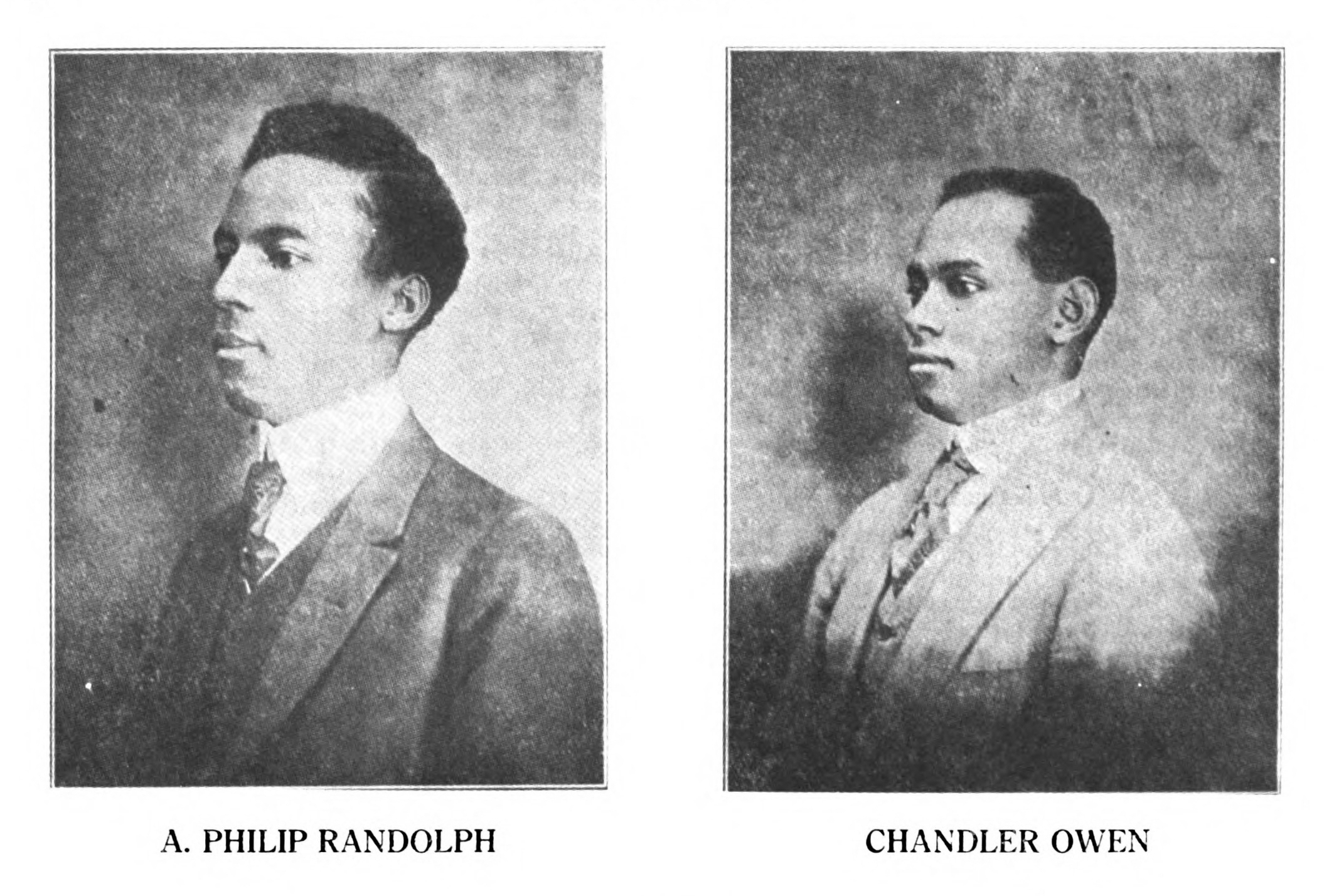
Randolph and Owen c. 1917

Toward the end of 1916, A. Philip Randolph and Chandler Owen dropped out of college, joined the Socialist Party, and gave soapbox orations on street corners around Harlem. Their socialist and labor union propagandizing gained them celebrity in the area. When they walked into the office building at 486 Lenox Avenue, while looking for a meeting space for their Independent Political Council, they were recognized by William White, President of the Headwaiters and Sidewaiters Society of Greater New York. He suggested they move into his society's headquarters and edit a monthly magazine for waiters.

From January until August 1917, Randolph and Owen published the Hotel Messenger. But their exposé of union corruption (wherein the headwaiters were selling uniforms to sidewaiters at high prices and pocketing the kickbacks from uniform dealers) resulted in their immediate dismissal.

== External conflicts ==
Throughout the magazine's tenure, Randolph and Owen encountered several setbacks due to their controversial magazine, including:

=== Conflict over socialism ===
After they were dismissed from the hotel they moved into a nearby office at 513 Lenox Avenue. With the patronage of Randolph's wife Lucille, they launched The Messenger. The first issue cost 15 cents (its price would never change) and ran the mission statement written by Randolph and Owen:

"Our aim is to appeal to reason, to lift our pens above the cringing demagogy of the times, and above the cheap peanut politics of the old reactionary Negro leaders. [This was a reference to Booker T. Washington, who promoted rural skills and compromise at Tuskegee Institute.] Patriotism has no appeal to us; justice has. Party has no weight with us; principle has. Loyalty is meaningless; it depends on what one is loyal to. Prayer is not one of our remedies; it depends on what one is praying for. We consider prayer as nothing more than a fervent wish; consequently the merit and worth of a prayer depend upon what the fervent wish is".

Declaring that "with us, economics and politics take precedence to music and art", the magazine's first two years were primarily devoted to advocating black labor unionism and socialism, and denouncing the War and its effects on black Americans. The magazine attacked President Woodrow Wilson's call to make "the world safe for democracy", when the black community was at risk in the U.S.: since the late 19th century, it had suffered a high rate of lynchings and violence in the South, and at the turn of the century most blacks were excluded from the political system and disenfranchised by changes in state law across the region that raised barriers to voter registration. They were excluded from the political system.

The editors of the Messenger also criticized major northern black figures such as W. E. B. Du Bois, who was pro-war at the time, and Marcus Garvey, an activist from Jamaica. They believed that Garvey's program to "repatriate" native-born American black citizens to Africa was illogical and far fetched.

Chandler Owens and A. Philip Randolph coined themselves “New Crowd Negroes”. Lacking a patriotic connection towards their country their stance on patriotism was “Patriotism has no appeal to us”. During this time the “New Negro” merged into society. At the time the U.S. Department of Justice described The Messenger as “the most able and the most dangerous publications of its time”. The Journal heavily supported the Socialist Party, then moved toward a less radical approach and unionizing black workers. Competing black African American magazines included Fire!! (An unusual magazine) and Opportunity (celebrated black culture) within the 1920s. These journals often had an overlap with the same writers in the magazines such as popular figures such as Zora Neale Hurtson and Langston Hughes.

=== Issues with the Justice Department ===
The Messenger declared:

"No intelligent Negro is willing to lay down his life for the United States as it now exists. Intelligent Negroes have now reached the point where their support of the country is conditional".

Such statements led to Justice Department agents ransacking the Messenger's editorial office in the dead of night, breaking furniture and confiscating back issues. Randolph and Owen conducted a public speaking tour against the war, appearing in Chicago and Cleveland, while selling copies of their fiery July 1918 issue.

Reaching Cleveland on 4 August, Randolph and Owen took turns addressing the mass meeting gathered by the city's Socialist Party leader Walter Bronstrup. He sold issues of the Messenger in the crowd until an undercover Justice Department official bought an issue and broke up the meeting. The DOJ official pulled Randolph from the stage, arrested him and Owen, and held them the following day for investigation. Randolph and Owen were held for trial under charges of violating the Espionage Act by:

"unlawfully, knowingly and feloniously, the United States being then and there at war with the Imperial German Government, willfully print and cause to be printed, publish and cause to be published, circulated, in a certain language intended to incite, provoke and incur resistance to the United States and to promote the cause of its enemies in a certain publication known as the Messenger.”

Socialism failed to attract followers in Harlem. By February 1920 the Messenger identified as "A Journal of Scientific Radicalism;” in June 1923, it billed itself as "The World’s Greatest Negro Monthly". It published increasing amounts of poetry, stories, and other work of Harlem intellectuals as the area became the center for black culture.

After two days in jail, the two men were brought to trial. The judge, looking at the two men and what they had written, said that he could not believe they were old enough, or, being black, smart enough to write that "red-hot stuff". He did not doubt that they were being used by white socialists who had written the editorials for them. He said there would be no trial and ordered Randolph and Owen returned to their parents' homes; telling them to leave town quickly. The men continued their tour. When they returned to New York, they learned that the Postmaster General Albert Burleson had denied second-class mailing privileges to their magazine because of its content.

== Impact within the Harlem Renaissance ==
Although lacking a literary editor, The Messenger was influential in the Harlem Renaissance; it published a range of new writers before they had reached literary reputations. Theophilus Lewis, the magazine's drama critic from September 1923 till May 1926, supported the African-American little theatre movement, and helped develop a black aesthetic in the theater. Lewis may have been untrained and was not paid for his contributions (apparently the Messenger offices paid only for his cab fare to and from shows), but his enthusiasm for the theater led to well-developed criticism. He helped shape African-American theater on many levels, from the little theaters to Broadway.

=== Comparable magazines ===
Lewis helped recruit Wallace Thurman to the magazine as a contributing editor. He later founded the influential magazine Fire!!, which explored controversial issues in the Black community, such as homosexuality, bisexuality, interracial relationships, promiscuity, prostitution, and color prejudice.Thurman worked at The Messenger from late 1925 to 1926 and helped to publish Zora Neale Hurston's "Eatonville Anthology", as well as the early stories of Langston Hughes (Hurston and Hughes joined Thurman as an editors of Fire!!). Thurman also became known for his novels The Blacker the Berry and Infants of Spring. George S. Schuyler, a staple of the magazine for his satiric column "Shafts and Darts" (which he sometimes wrote with help from Lewis), contributed the piece "Hobohemia" to the Messenger. He became a correspondent and Chief Editorial Writer for the Pittsburgh Courier. Schuyler earned some renown for his satirical novel Black No More.

The Journal Opportunity featured data and research pertaining to Black lives in America. While not as widely read as The Crisis or The Messenger, the journal was instrumental in providing breaks for new artists through its literary contests and literary parties.

The Crisis was utilized to encourage negro writers. Du Bois wrote that the goal of the publication was to "set forth those facts and arguments which show the danger of race prejudice, particularly as manifested today toward colored people."

== The end of The Messenger ==
The magazine was always in such debt that it did not publish at all during some months where coeditors were on fundraising lecture tours. Contributors received only token payments. Money problems forced the magazine to change offices after being evicted from its first base. They were evicted again after three years, and leased space at 2311 Seventh Avenue. It published from there until folding in 1928 from lack of funds.

== Notable contributors/essays ==
=== Claude Mckay ===
"If We Must Die"(1919)

"Labor's Day"(1919)

"Birds of Prey"(1922)

=== Langston Hughes ===
"Prayer for a Winter Night"(1924)

"Grant Park"(1924)

"Gods"(1924)

"The Naughty Child"(1927)

"Youth"(1927)

"Minnie Sings her Blues"(1927)

"Desire"(1927)

"Bodies in The Moonlight"(1927)

=== Zora Neale Hurston ===
"The Hue and Cry About Howard University"(1925)

"The Eatonville Anthology"(1926)

=== Alice Dunbar Nelson ===
"Woman's Most Serious Problem"(1927)
