= Charles Beard =

Charles Beard may refer to:

- Charles Beard (priest) (1870–1943), dean of Glasgow and Galloway
- Charles Beard (Unitarian) (1827–1888), English Unitarian divine, vice-president of University College, Liverpool
- Charles A. Beard (1874–1948), American historian
- Charles E. Beard (1920–2006), librarian in Georgia, U.S.
- Charles R. Beard (1879–1965), minister and politician of West Virginia, U.S.
- Charles Edmund Beard (1900–1982), CEO and president Braniff International Airways
- Charles Taschereau Beard (1890–1948), Canadian naval officer and politician
- Dave Beard (Charles David Beard, born 1959), former pitcher in Major League Baseball
- Edmund Charles Beard (1894–1974), British Major-General during the Second World War
