= List of people from Martinsburg, West Virginia =

This is a list of people who were born in, lived in, or are closely associated with the city of Martinsburg, West Virginia.

== Athletics ==
- Tyson Bagent, quarterback for the Chicago Bears
- Scott Bullett, former outfielder for the Pittsburgh Pirates, Chicago Cubs
- Vicky Bullett, Olympic gold medalist in women's basketball
- Corey Hill, UFC fighter
- Christian Rose, racing driver
- Fulton Walker, former football player for the Miami Dolphins
- Trevon Wesco, tight end for the Las Vegas Raiders
- Hack Wilson, Hall of Fame baseball player

== Arts and entertainment ==
- Kathe Burkhart, artist, writer, feminist
- Danny Casolaro, writer
- Robert Lee Castleman, Grammy-winning singer/songwriter
- Karl Hess, former D.C. insider, relocated to the Martinsburg area in the 1970s
- Walter Dean Myers, author
- Mary Elizabeth Price, impressionist painter
- Ronald Radosh, author
- Mary Ann Shaffer, writer, editor, librarian
- David Hunter Strother (aka Porte Crayon), artist
- Garland Wilson, jazz pianist

== Education and science ==
- Charles Boarman, physician
- Charles Porterfield Krauth, Lutheran theologian

== Politics and service ==
- Newton D. Baker, Secretary of War and Mayor of Cleveland
- Charles R. Beard, minister, politician; represented Berkeley County in the West Virginia House of Delegates
- Belle Boyd, Confederate spy in the American Civil War
- Summers Burkhart, attorney
- Harry Flood Byrd — Sr., U.S. Senator and Governor of Virginia
- J.R. Clifford, first African-American attorney in West Virginia
- Charles James Faulkner, U.S. Senator from West Virginia
- John S. Gallaher, Virginia state legislator and newspaperman
- Michael Hite, state delegate
- Joseph Howard Hodges, fifth Bishop of the Roman Catholic Diocese of Wheeling
- Edward F. McClain, member of the Wisconsin State Assembly
- Virginia Faulkner McSherry, President-General of the United Daughters of the Confederacy
- John Quincy Adams Nadenbousch, colonel in Confederate States Army
- Absalom Willis Robertson, U.S. Senator from Virginia
- Gray Silver, state senator and founder of the American Farm Bureau Federation

== Other ==
- Anthony Senecal, butler of Donald Trump
