= Tommie Dora Barker =

American librarian

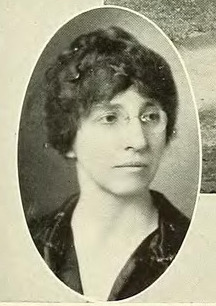
- Tommie Dora Barker, from the 1927 yearbook of Agnes Scott College
- Born: November 15, 1888; Rockmart, Georgia
- Died: February 6, 1978 (aged 89)
- Occupations: Librarian, Dean
- Known for: Regional field work for the American Library Association

Academic background
- Education: Agnes Scott College

Academic work
- Notable works: Libraries of the South: a report on developments 1930-1935

Tommie Dora Barker (Nov. 15, 1888 – Feb. 6, 1978) was an American librarian and founding dean of Emory Library School in Atlanta, Georgia. She also served as a regional field agent, representing southern libraries, for the American Library Association.

== Early life ==
Barker was born in Rockmart, Georgia to parents Thomas Nathaniel and Medora Elizabeth Lovejoy Barker. She attended Atlanta Girls' High School before pursuing higher education at Agnes Scott College. In 1909, she graduated from Carnegie Library School of Atlanta.

== Career ==
Barker was hired in 1909 by the Alabama Department of Archives and History as an assistant manager of Alabama's traveling libraries. This included reference work, maintaining the organizational structure of the department's library, overseeing a training course for library students, and serving as Secretary of the Alabama Library Association.

Barker returned to Atlanta in 1911 to work as a reference assistant for the Carnegie Library School. In 1915, she became the Director of Carnegie Library and its training school. During these years, the library faced budget cuts, which caused a series of problems from overworked staff to lack of support from local government, and ultimately restricted expansion.

A recommendation to the Board of Education for Librarianship (BEL) of the American Library Association (ALA), submitted by C.C. Williamson, advocated the shutting down of schools working with public libraries, specifically Atlanta. He argued the lack of demand for professional librarians in the South and believed Northern librarians could satisfy the needs of the South. In response to this challenge, Barker fought to improve the Carnegie Library School with the help of BEL. By 1925, the school had a loose partnership with Emory University, with a larger curriculum and staff. The school achieved junior undergraduate status by BEL in 1926, and graduate status in 1928.

Along with promoting the Carnegie Library School, Barker advocated for the improvement of Southern libraries in general. She alongside Charlotte Templeton and Mary Utopia Rothrock co-formed an association in 1920 to be a regional voice in policy-making; this association was named the Southeastern Library Association (SELA) in 1922. Barker served as the association's third president from 1926 to 1928.

Among her other duties, Barker served as president of the Georgia Library Association from 1920-1921.

Barker became the first woman to receive an honorary doctorate by Emory in 1930 for her work in securing funding for the Carnegie Library School. She requested the Carnegie Corporation and Rosenwald Fund to each donate $50,000 ($730,137.14 comparatively, after inflation) a year as it moved into Emory and became a professional library. In 1940, the Carnegie Foundation endowed the school with $100,000 ($1,825,342.86 after inflation).

Barker opened the Auburn Avenue Branch Library, the first African-American branch library in Atlanta, in the Sweet Auburn neighborhood in 1921.

=== Membership and regional field agent for ALA ===
Barker began her membership with ALA in 1909, and served on its Membership Committee from 1921-1922. She also served on the ALA Council from 1923-1928. In 1927, she was nominated for honorary vice-president, but lost to Charles Rodan. The nomination was the second given to a southerner, and the loss "reflected the South's lack of voting strength in the ALA".

Barker left the Carnegie Library School in 1930 to work as a regional field agent for the American Library Association, representing Southern libraries.

== Personal life ==
Barker never married or had children. She lived for many years with her mother and two of her sisters, including Mary Cornelia Barker.

== Death ==
Barker died February 6, 1978, three months after suffering a stroke. She is buried in Rose Hill Cemetery in Rockmart, Georgia.

== Selected bibliography ==
- Barker, Tommie Dora (1936). Libraries of the South : a report on developments, 1930-1935. Chicago, Illinois: American Library Association. OCLC 575634.
- Barker, Tommie Dora (1945). Report of a Survey of the Library of the Young Men's Library Association of Augusta for the Board of Directors. American Library Association. OCLC 6721214.
- Carmichael, James Vinson (1987). Tommie Dora Barker and Southern Librarianship. University of North Carolina at Chapel Hill. OCLC 862116331.
- Papers at Stuart A. Rose Manuscript, Archives and Rare Book Library.
