= Southeastern Library Association =

American library association

The Southeastern Library Association (SELA) is an organization that collaborates with different library associations within the Southeastern United States, including Alabama, Arkansas, Florida, Georgia, Kentucky, Louisiana, Mississippi, North Carolina, South Carolina, Tennessee, Virginia, and West Virginia.

SELA works with members of state library associations who are also members of SELA. Every other year a Leadership Conference is convened in which officers, directors, state representatives, and other SELA leadership members meet up to discuss issues, such as the functionality of SELA and the Biennial Conference. For over sixty years SELA has been instrumental in influencing legislation and garnering foundation and federal funds to support regional library projects.

The association's accomplishments include the creation of two library surveys, the adoption of school library standards, the establishment of state library agencies, the founding of library schools, the sponsoring of workshops, and SELn, a regional research and professional journal that has received national recognition.

== History ==
=== 1920s ===
The idea for a southern library association was conceived in 1920 by librarians Tommie Dora Barker, Mary Utopia Rothrock, and Charlotte Templeton, on their way to an American Library Association meeting in Colorado Springs. Their idle conversation about the possibility of a regional library association evolved into a serious discussion about the advantages a regional library association might offer. After a meeting in early June the ALA sent out letters to leading southern librarians describing the proposed meeting and asking for criticism, suggestions, and support. Once the responses to the preliminary letters were received, invitations to the first meeting were dispatched. The first regional meeting took place in Signal Mountain, Tennessee, on November 12 and 13, 1920, with an attendance of approximately one hundred librarians from seven states. This meeting was originally called the Southeastern Library Conference; its purpose was to address the general, professional issues concerning information professionals at the time rather than topics on administration and technique. The success of the first meeting prompted conference leaders to schedule another meeting for November 1922. Library Journal, edited by Melvil Dewey, reported that the association was officially founded at the November 1922 meeting, and the journal published the association's proposed constitution. During the 1922 meetings attendees addressed several key issues, such as, the provision of library services, the establishment of training facilities for African Americans, and the adoption of a new constitution that provided an informal organization based upon state membership (automatically making members of state library organizations SELA members). In addition, librarians Mary Utopia Rothrock, of the Lawson McGhee Library in Knoxville, and Charlotte Templeton, of the Greenville Public Library, were elected the first president and secretary-treasurer of the association. During the 1924 Asheville Conference, nine states- Alabama, Florida, Georgia, Kentucky, Mississippi, North Carolina, South Carolina, Tennessee, and Virginia- ratified the constitution. The April 1926 Signal Mountain Conference established goals to improve library services over a ten-year period, including the negotiation with the Southern Association of Colleges and Schools regarding standards for school libraries and institutions offering courses on school librarianship. On the final conference of the decade, the 1928 conference in Biloxi, substantial progress was made in providing services to minorities, establishing standards, and setting up state library agencies; and in 1929 the Policy Committee prepared a special report citing critical needs for the Southeast to be submitted to their national foundations at their January 1930 meetings.

=== 1930s ===
The goals that were identified in 1929, by the Policy Committee, were achieved with the financial support from three educational foundations: (1) The Julius Rosenwald Fund provided support to numerous school and college libraries for African Americans, sponsored demonstration programs of public library service, and laid the foundation for library extension work in the South through grants to several southern states. (2) The General Education Board, which made funds available to establish the position of school library supervisor in eight of the nine southeastern states whose role to support research programs and to sponsor cooperative enterprises in university libraries in the southern U.S. region. (3) The Carnegie Corporation which funded a survey of library training facilities in the South and provided direct assistance in updating collections in many college and university libraries in the region. The 1930 Tampa conference included reports on the completed survey of library training programs, the need for librarian certification, continued support for county library development, and better library legislation. In 1934 the first joint conference of the Southeastern and Southwestern Library Association was held in Memphis; the purpose of the joint conference was to address the evolving relationship between libraries and social development and the need for governmental support. Attendees were challenged to plan constructively in all developmental areas from elementary school to the largest research library by Louis Round Wilson Dean of the University of Chicago Graduate Library School. Two years later, during the 1936 Asheville conference, cooperative measures to strengthen research facilities were discussed. During the 1938 Atlanta conference discussions were held on federal and state aid; librarians began to recognize the importance of obtaining government funding for library development and they were willing to seek it.

=== 1940s ===
Federal aid continued to be at the forefront at the 1940 Savannah conference. The association was also in need of reorganization and for necessary committees to be established however, because of World War II, all conferences had to be suspended, but some programs were continued and a survey on the size and effectiveness of southern libraries, jointly sponsored by SELA and the TVA Library Council was undertaken. Conferences started up again in 1946 in Asheville and reorganization was once again the main priority of the meeting agenda; two committees were set up: The Publications Committee to investigate the publishing studies affecting regional librarianship and the feasibility of establishing a quarterly journal, and the Activities Committee to revise the constitution. The reports of these two committees were approved during the 1948 Louisville conference, and they also provided for annual meetings, a headquarters office, a full-time executive secretary, and a quarterly journal.

=== 1950s ===
On March 13, 1950, although Tennessee was essentially the birthplace of the SELA, Georgia became the state where the SELA became a legal corporation to enter into legal contracts. The headquarters office was established at Georgia Tech (where it remained for the next twenty years) and Dorothy M. Corsland, librarian at the Georgia Institute of Technology, became the first acting Executive Secretary. In Atlanta, October 1950, a new constitution was prepared; it was finalized by November 4, 1950. The first issue of the Southeastern Librarian came out in 1951; first issued semi-annually, it has been issued quarterly since 1953. In 1952, then president Louis Shores appointed the first Southern Books Competition Committee, which; to this day, remains to be a major project for SELA. Cataloging practices in small libraries were also surveyed during that year at the Atlanta Conference; and, in fact, the meeting concluded the first biennium as an incorporated organization. In 1956 President Nancy Jane Day persuaded the Southern States Work Conference to take school libraries as one of its study projects, which significantly enhanced the visibility of school libraries. During the Roanoke Conference of that same year the Trustees and Friends of the Library, formed in 1946, officially met as a section of the Southeastern Library Association, and, upon recommendation from the SELA Activities Committee, a workshop for new committee chairs and officers was called for February 1958, which became a customary practice for SELA. During the 1958 Louisville Conference, with Regionalism being the main objective, the association discussed ways to strengthen the relationship between the nine affiliated state associations and the association itself.

=== 1960s ===
This was a decade where SELA made significant advancements, attributable to the major federal legislation advancements made at the time. The Asheville SELA conference of 1960 was preceded by two workshops on facilities: The Public Library Building Institute and the College Library Buildings Institute. Before the 1962 conference, three more workshops were held: Recruiting for Librarianship in the Southeast, Library Education, and Library Service to Business and Industry. At the 1962 conference The Reference Services Section reported on a survey of the inter-library loan services in libraries of all types. During the 1964 conference in Norfolk the Sections of the association were, for the first time, responsible for planning the general sessions and, following the passage of the Higher Education Act (HEA), the officers representing SELA attended many workshops concerning Title II (HEA) programs and its allocations. In 1967 a workshop on Interlibrary Loan Cooperation was held to assist in the implementation of Title III of the Library Services and Construction Act. The first workshop on Library Automation was held in Gatlinburg in 1968. By the next conference, which took place in Miami, membership reached 3,085, the largest number on record.

=== 1970s ===
In 1970, two new sections of the SELA were approved during the Atlanta conference: Special Libraries and Library Education. In addition, the constitution was revised to include an elected secretary and a paid executive secretary. By 1971 a comprehensive survey of libraries in the Southern region was initiated; the information compiled within the survey was meant to supplement and update the information collected in the original survey which was done twenty-five years ago. In 1974, during a conference in Richmond, West Virginia became the tenth state affiliate of the SELA. Between 1975 and 1976 the results from the survey were published in the University of Alabama Press, Libraries and Library Services in the Southeast. In addition; January 2, 1975 marked the first SOLINET terminal at Emory University. To implement the recommendations from the survey Dr. Mary Edna Anders, of the Industrial Development Division at Georgia Tech, was appointed part-time interim Executive Director of SELA, and during her six-month tenure detailed planning for the headquarters, including funding, was accomplished. In August, 1976 TVA granted $100,000 to assist in the support of the headquarters office as a demonstration in regional development during the next four years. The SELA's first permanent award was established in January 1976 at the bequest of the estate of Mary Utopia Rothrock (one of the early founders of SELA) to provide a biennial award to a southeastern librarian for exceptional library development within the region. On January 3, 1977, former librarian of Austin Peay University, Johnnie Givens, became the first full-time Executive Director, and during that time two grants from the National Endowment for the Humanities and the Oak Ridge National Laboratory for a Solar Technology Transfer Program were secured. That same year, two publications were simultaneously prepared by two different SELA committees: The Southeastern Bibliographic Directory: Academic Libraries and Special Collections in Libraries of the Southeast; by 1978 the association had the publications distributed. 1978 was also the year two of the association's prestigious awards were given out: the first activity award went to the Greenville County Public Library in South Carolina in recognition for the outstanding children's program and Pulitzer Prize winner, Eudora Welty, received the first Outstanding Author Award. In addition, John Gribben and Kenneth E. Toombs, founders of SOLINET, received the Rothrock Award. In fall of 1978 the Junior Members Round Table was established. In 1979, after discontinuing the Executive Director's position, the Executive Board, in the best fiscal interest of the association, decided to staff the headquarters office once again with a part-time executive secretary and a full-time office manager. In June of that year, The Southeastern Librarian received special ALA recognition when it was awarded the H.W.Wilson Award for the most outstanding library periodical of the preceding year. Also, in observance of the twenty-fifth anniversary of SELA's Southern Books Competition, the association published a list of award winners from 1952 to 1977. In 1979, after several transfers, headquarters was finally moved from Georgia Tech to an office complex in Tucker, Georgia.

=== 1980s ===
During the Birmingham Conference of 1980, members observed the association's sixtieth anniversary with the publication of The Southeastern Library Association, Its History and Its Honorary Members, 1920-1980. In 1980, the association honored Virginia Lacy Jones, one of the first African-Americans to earn their PhD in Library Science, with the Mary Rothrock award. The 1980-82 biennium saw the creation of three new roundtables: Library Instruction, Online Search Librarians, and Government Documents. The biennium also conducted several workshops, such as, "Library Marketing" sponsored by the Public Relations Committee, "From Tape to Product: Some Practical Considerations" sponsored by the Resources and Technical Services Section, and "Crisis in the Southeast" (focusing on children's services) sponsored by the School and Children's Librarians Section. At the 1982 conference in Louisville, Kentucky, an expanded, revised version of the SELA Handbook was distributed to members, and Louisiana became the eleventh constituent member of the association. In Spring of 1987, upon examination of the association's organizational structure, then SELA president Charles Beard recommended that the Legislative/Library Cooperation Committee be split into two separate committees, because of the need of increased emphasis on these two areas. President Beard also requested for a special interest group on Library Services to the Aging to be established; this special interest group became a sub-committee to the Reference and Adult Services Section. During the 1986 biennial conference in Atlanta, the SELA introduced a resolution to support the Division of Library and Information Management at Emory University preventing the closing of one of the leading library and information management programs in the nation.

=== 1990s ===
The 1990s was an important period for the Southeastern Library Association; it was an opportunity for members and committee leaders to embrace new challenges and focus on the needs and opportunities of the coming years. SELA associates were focusing on preparations for the 1991 White House Conference on Library and Information Science; the second national gathering of librarians and advocates. Local and national meetings were held to gather opinions and to determine directions for this national gathering of librarians and advocates, and an ad hoc task force, which met August 16–18, 1990, was created as a preliminary consensus building step. The association has been struggling to maintain its program within their existing revenue, and in light of the changing roles of librarianship the association needed to show that it can embrace pragmatism. In the Spring of 1996, then SELA president Joe Forsee appointed a committee to study the future directions of the Southeastern Library Association. The newly created Future Directions Committee began its work by reviewing the traditional roles of SELA and whether those roles existed or needed to be played within the Southeast, plus new roles that SELA might take up that are needed by its members and those who are associated with the library and information services field. Throughout the 1990s, members worked on a variety of projects for the betterment of the association and the library profession, for example, a new SELA membership directory was created and the traveling SELA exhibit was refreshed.

=== 2000s ===
After the September 11, 2001 attacks libraries faced new intellectual freedom challenges caused by the U.S. Patriot Act and other restrictive legislation. In addition, the explosion of the Internet and the introduction of Library 2.0 profoundly changed how libraries function. As a result, SELA was forced to adapt, for instance, much of the committee work; which was performed through conference calls and correspondence; was transferred to electronic discussions, and emphasis was placed on the expansion of the SELA website, in fact, the site was hosted by a variety of organizations and institutions, such as, the Southeast Florida Library Information Network (SEFLIN), The University of Central Florida, and Austin Peay State University. The association's publication, The Southeastern Librarian, also made great strides with the introduction of the peer-review process. Issues also became available electronically on the association's website, and H. W. Wilson contracted with the association to offer online access to the journal. The Southeastern Librarian also transitioned to a twice yearly e-newsletter and a bi-annual traditional journal. In 2006 SELA archives were transferred from Emory University to the Valdosta State University Archives and Special Collections department. In 2002 the Ginny Frankenthaler Memorial Scholarship was created to provide financial assistance toward completion of a graduate degree in library science. During this decade, due to reduced participation of state organizations and the decline in revenue, SELA members had to think of strategies to ensure the future of the Southeastern Library Association; in January 2007, a new committee structure was introduced including the new Membership and Mentoring Committee. In 2008 the SELA President's Award was renamed the Charles E. Beard Award, named after the former president of SELA who died in 2004; he was known for being a strong advocate for libraries and an advocate for library workers on the local, state, regional, and national levels.

== Conferences and officers ==
"Biennial Meetings and Officers of the Southeastern Library Association" (PDF). Southeastern Library Association.

== Awards ==
Sources:

- Charles E. Beard Award (formerly President's Award)
- Honorary SELA Membership Award
- Information Technology Award for Excellence in Research and Scholarship
- Outstanding Authors Awards
- Outstanding Library Program Award
- Rothrock Award
- Southern Books Competition

== SELA State Associations ==
- Alabama Library Association (ALLA)
- Arkansas Library Association (ARLA)
- Florida Library Association (FLA)
- Georgia Library Association (GLA)
- Kentucky Library Association (KLA)
- Louisiana Library Association (LLA)
- North Carolina Library Association (NCLA)
- South Carolina Library Association (SCLA)
- Tennessee Library Association (TLA)
- Virginia Library Association (VLA)
- West Virginia Library Association (WVLA)

== See also ==
- List of libraries in the United States
