= Anne Smith =

Anne or Ann Smith may refer to:

== Arts and media ==
- Ann Smith Franklin (born Ann Smith, 1696–1763), American newspaper printer and publisher
- Anne Smith (silversmith) (fl. 1771–1782), English silversmith
- Ann Eliza Smith (1819–1905), American author and patriot
- Anne Smith (fl. 1955), actress in The Time of His Life
- Anne Easter Smith, British-American novelist
- Anne Mollegen Smith, American magazine editor and writer
- Anne Smith (Scottish writer) (1944–2013), Scottish academic, writer and editor
- Ann Lesley Smith (born 1956), American journalist

== Sport ==
- Anne Smith (runner) (1941–1993), British middle-distance runner
- Anne Smith (footballer) (born 1951), New Zealand footballer
- Anne Smith (tennis) (born 1959), American tennis player

== Other fields ==
- Ann Smith (activist) (fl. 1682–1686), English anti-Catholic political activist
- Lady Anne Culling Smith (1775–1844), sister of Arthur Wellesley, 1st Duke of Wellington
- Dame Anne Beadsmore Smith (1869–1960), British Army nurse
- Anne Ripley Smith (1881–1949), co-founder of Alcoholics Anonymous
- Anne Abel Smith (born 1932), British aristocrat and charity volunteer
- Anne Smith (academic) (1940–2016), New Zealand children's rights researcher
- Ann Alexander Smith (born 1947), Louisiana educator
- Anne Smith, Lady Smith (born 1955), Scottish Supreme Court judge

== Fictional characters ==
- Ann Smith, a character in Mr. & Mrs. Smith

== See also ==
- Anna Smith (disambiguation)
- Annie Smith (disambiguation)
