= Annie Smith Ross =

American librarian (1866–1924)

- Born: Anne "Annie" Leticia Smith; March 4 1866
- Died: April 20 1924
- Burial place: Charlotte, North Carolina
- Other names: Annie Smith Hovey
- Occupations: Librarian, library director
- Years active: 1902–1910
- Organization: Charlotte Carnegie library
- Board member of: North Carolina Library Association (president), North Carolina Library Commission (secretary), Children's Librarians Section advisory board of the American Library Association (appointed member)
- Spouse(s): James T. Ross, Edward Clarence Hovey
- Children: One son (died in infancy)
- Parents: Captain Thomas T. Smith (father); Laura Barbara Boone (mother)

Annie Smith Ross (March 4, 1866 – April 20, 1924), born Anne "Annie" Leticia Smith and later known as Annie Smith Hovey, was the first professionally trained librarian and library director at the public library in Charlotte, North Carolina, USA. In addition to her work in the local community, Ross led the creation of the North Carolina Library Association, a statewide organization of librarians that is active to this day, and served as the organization's first president from 1904 until 1908. She served as secretary of the North Carolina Library Commission and as an appointed member of the Children's Librarians Section advisory board of the American Library Association.

Ross's librarian work centered on the Carnegie library located at 6th and Tryon streets in Charlotte. (The original building was torn down in 1954, and the area is now served by the Charlotte Mecklenburg Library system.) She worked there from before the library's opening day in 1903 until her resignation in 1910. Ross was an example of an early public librarian in the state, as "public libraries were almost unknown in North Carolina until 1900."

== Early life, education, and first marriage ==
Anne "Annie" Leticia Smith was born on March 4, 1866 to Laura Barbara Boone and Captain Thomas T. Smith, and grew up in Alamance County, North Carolina. Later her family moved to Charlotte, North Carolina, where her father worked for railroad companies. Ross graduated from the Charlotte Female Institute in Charlotte, studying literature and history.

She married her first husband, James T. Ross, in Charlotte on January 27, 1886, becoming known as Annie Smith Ross. They had one son, who died in infancy. The year after the death of their son, James died of pneumonia on December 6, 1901. Ross subsequently moved back in with her parents.

== Librarianship ==
=== Librarian education ===
On November 11, 1902, the board of the Carnegie library of Charlotte announced that Ross would become its first librarian. Records from that period give no information as to how or why she was chosen for the position, but in any event she quickly decided to pursue professional training in librarianship. She found Anne Wallace at the Carnegie library in Atlanta, Georgia (about 250 miles from Charlotte) to serve as her teacher. Wallace, who had lacked sufficient help to run the Atlanta Carnegie library, had created a program in which young librarians could work at the library in exchange for training in the profession of librarianship.)

=== Charlotte library ===
After Ross's return from her librarian training in Atlanta, she helped the Charlotte Carnegie library prepare for its opening day on July 2, 1903. Her new duties were many and varied: "As the librarian, she was responsible for providing reference service and conducting reader advisory, creating programs for both children and adults, and supervising the technical work of cataloging and repairing books, as well as training potential assistants", an article about Ross explained. For this work, she was paid $480/year in 1903, though this increased to $720/year by 1908. She also designed promotional materials for featured books to whet patrons' appetites for specific titles. In addition to book-focused programming, she put on cultural events at the library, "arranging musical recitals, guest lectures, and dramatic readings." Though the number of books at Ross's library initially totaled only 2,526, within five years, under her oversight, it had grown to 5,350 volumes.

Ross was helped in the operation of the library by a library assistant and a janitor during most of her time at the Charlotte library, but insufficient staffing was still an issue. However, she did eventually manage to extend the library's hours later into the evening (as late as 9 p.m.) to make the library more accessible to those who worked during the day. A local newspaper reported that "[t]he popularity of the library at night continues to increase, proving the wisdom of the night opening."

To recruit help for the library's operations, Ross began her own training program at the Charlotte library for women interested in becoming librarians. One of her first two apprentices ended up becoming a long-term employee of the Charlotte library. Ross herself received additional formal instruction in librarianship by attending a summer library school in 1904 at the University of North Carolina at Chapel Hill. The classes were taught by Louis Round Wilson, a figure who remains prominent in library science both within North Carolina and beyond.

In 1905 The Charlotte Observer reported that despite the Carnegie library's small size, under Ross's direction, "great care and judgement has been exercised in the selection of the books. There are fewer libraries in the South that are better arranged and more carefully classified."

=== Children's librarianship ===
Ross made visits to local schools to encourage children to visit the Charlotte library, which, under her tenure, opened a designated children's room in 1904. One book about the history of the Charlotte library notes that having a children's room was "a very modern idea in the early 1900s." She decorated the walls of the room with "pictures, birds, trees, etc." Ross held children's story hours and lectures meant for audiences of children, including on the library's highly popular "Bird Day" in 1904, which drew 400 to 600 youngsters and adults, according to differing accounts.

Ross wrote in 1903 that she believed "[o]ne of the most important features of library work is work with children." In 1906 she was appointed to the national American Library Association's Children's Librarians Section advisory board at its annual meeting in Narragansett Pier, Rhode Island.

=== Library advocacy and outreach ===
Ross saw public libraries' role in society as important. "Unquestionably the public library is about the most practical beneficence of modern times," she told a newspaper reporter in 1906. She seemed puzzled that libraries' role should need defending, writing: "It seems strange standing as we do in the dawn of the Twentieth Century it should be necessary to defend or justify the library as an important practical part of our educational system. The public library is an adult school, it is a perpetual and lifelong continuation class, it is the greatest educational factor that we have."

Eager to promote the library's services to the community, Ross encouraged cooperation between her library and other local groups. She told a news reporter, "In the [Charlotte] Carnegie library, the aim is to cooperate with all existing educational agencies, for the general upbringing of the community". She also reminded the public that the library's children's room was available for community groups' use on weekday mornings.

She engaged in public advocacy for the Charlotte Carnegie library even after her resignation. In March 1910, Ross, using her new married name Annie Smith Hovey, wrote to the Charlotte Observer newspaper in response to a reader's suggestion for the creation of a history museum for Charlotte (which the newspaper deemed "A Suggestion That Should Be Acted Upon"). The reader had suggested that such a museum could get its start inside the library until it got its own building. Ross supported the reader's idea and made a plea for additional town appropriations for the library. She wrote that $1,500 in annual appropriations could unlock tenfold that amount from philanthropist Andrew Carnegie, which could pay for a library expansion big enough to include space for both historical items and more books.

=== Fundraising and resignation ===
In the years leading up to her resignation, Ross wrote in the Charlotte library's annual reports about the lack of funding that the library faced, and pleaded for more money for books. In an effort to raise funds, she started a book rental program in which certain fiction books could be rented from the library for two cents per day; after some time had passed and a book was no longer as popular, it would return to the library's main, free, lending collection. Members of the Charlotte Woman's Club also ran various fundraisers for the library.

Ross submitted her letter of resignation from the library on January 5, 1910. One local newspaper opined that the news of her resignation would "be received by the public with the keenest regret."

== North Carolina Library Association ==
Ross had attended the American Library Association's national conference in 1899, when North Carolina did not have any organization to serve as a state chapter. A few years later, not long after she returned to North Carolina from her librarian training in Atlanta, she began working on creating a state library association. During the winter of 1903–1904, she drafted letters inviting other librarians to form such an organization, and sent them to 18 librarians throughout the state. Six recipients responded with interest, and when they met in May 1904, this small group led to the ALA-affiliated North Carolina Library Association (NCLA)'s formation.

Ross was widely recognized as being the main force behind the North Carolina Library Association's creation. Librarian Louis Round Wilson publicly credited her as having led the movement to create the North Carolina Library Association, and separately referred to her "vital influence" in its creation. An article in the Charlotte Observer said Ross "was the first to agitate a movement for a library association" in the state.

Ross was elected as the NCLA's first president, and the group held its first meeting in November 1904. She continued to hold the position of president of the organization until 1908.

== North Carolina Library Commission ==
At the May 1907 meeting of the North Carolina Library Association in Asheville, North Carolina (the organization's third gathering), a group of members pushed for the creation of a library commission within North Carolina state government that could aid libraries throughout the state. However, the movement was unsuccessful at that time. The fourth NCLA meeting, held in Greensboro, North Carolina in November 1908, saw more powerful lobbying and the appointment of a legislative committee to work on writing a draft of a bill. The momentum and organizing from that meeting ultimately resulted in the 1909 creation of the North Carolina Library Commission by the North Carolina legislature.

In 1909 Ross was appointed to the new state-level library commission in the role of secretary. To assist in advising North Carolina libraries, the commission was tasked with gathering "complete statistics of all libraries and other library activities in the state". It also took over the operation of traveling libraries from the Federation of Women's Clubs, and began publishing the North Carolina Library Bulletin, as well as working toward the establishment of library training programs within the state.

== 1906 ALA convention ==
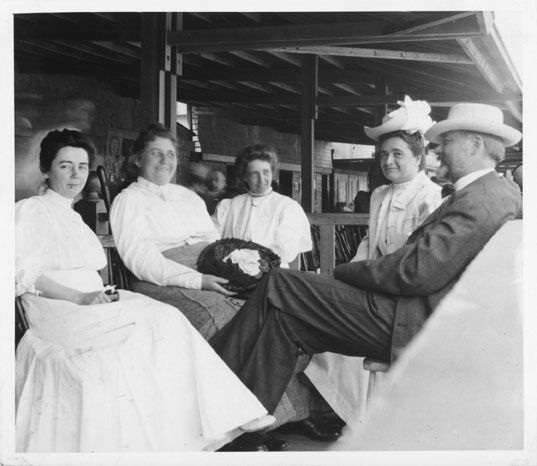
Annie Smith Ross (second from right) with other attendees of the 1906 American Library Association conference in Narragansett Pier, Rhode Island

The national American Library Association's annual meeting in 1906 was held in Narragansett Pier, Rhode Island, and Ross traveled from North Carolina to be there. There, she and a group of other conference attendees from North Carolina formally invited the ALA to hold its 1907 convention in the city of Asheville. Even though the North Carolina Library Association was just two years old at that point, the invitation to Asheville was accepted by leaders of the national group.

The 1906 trip to Narragansett Pier was also when Ross first met her future husband Edward Clarence Hovey (1854–1936). He was from the Boston area, and held the post of executive secretary (now called executive director) of the ALA from 1905 to 1907.

== Second marriage and death ==
Not long after her resignation from the Charlotte library, Ross married her second husband, Edward Clarence Hovey, on February 5, 1910. The marriage was arranged to take place at Ross's parents' house on South Myers Street in Charlotte, and the ceremony was described as a quiet gathering with few guests. The couple moved to South Carolina, then to Maryland in 1918, and later to South Carolina again.

It is not known if Ross (who now went by her new married name Annie Smith Hovey) was involved in library work outside of North Carolina. However, she continued to be a member of the NCLA until 1923.

Ross died of cancer on April 20, 1924 after a long illness, and was buried in Charlotte, North Carolina.

== Public perceptions ==
Ross was spoken of favorably by people who worked with her. One writer said she was "well-known for her warmth and professionalism". Thomas L. Montgomery, vice president of the National Association of State Libraries, joked genially at the group's 1907 convention, "We are simply here because Mrs. Annie Smith Ross told us to come, and as long as the South sends such a fine representative it can control all library associations."

Ross and her peers from the public libraries in Greensboro and Durham, were described as "strong librarians at [the] helm". Another writer described her librarian work as being "reportedly advanced for her time", and said that she "energetically implemented modern ideas for the early 1900s". Another writer who chronicled Ross's life wrote, "She was a woman who brought intelligence, enthusiasm, and foresight to the profession of librarianship."

After the North Carolina Library Association's fourth annual meeting in Greensboro, North Carolina, the group expressed "high appreciation of her many services in its behalf from its organization and her unceasing endeavor to bring success to its undertakings." A 1909 Charlotte Observer article described Ross's direction of the Charlotte library as "excellent", and an earlier article in the same publication described her as a "popular and efficient librarian". Upon the news of Ross's resignation, a news article in Charlotte's Evening Chronicle said she had become "one of Charlotte"s most widely known and popular women" and that "she deserves the greatest praise."
