= Annie Smith =

Annie Smith may refer to:

- Annie Smith (athlete) (born 1939), American long jumper
- Annie R. Smith (1828–1855), Seventh-day Adventist hymn writer
- Annie Morrill Smith (1856–1946), American botanist
- Annie Lorrain Smith (1854–1937), British lichenologist
- Annie Smith (EastEnders), fictional character in the soap opera EastEnders
- Annie Smith Ross (1866–1924), née Smith, American librarian and library director

== See also ==
- Annie Smith Peck (1850–1935), American mountaineer
- Anne Smith (disambiguation)
- Anna Smith (disambiguation)
