= Mary U. Rothrock =

American librarian and historian

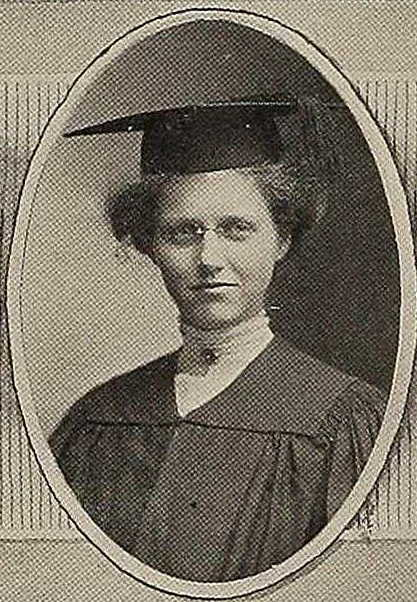
- Rothrock in 1911

President of the American Library Association
- In office 1946–1947
- Preceded by: Ralph A. Ulveling
- Succeeded by: Paul North Rice

Personal details
- Born: Mary Utopia Rothrock; September 19, 1890 Trenton, Tennessee, US
- Died: January 30, 1976 (aged 85) Knoxville, Tennessee, US
- Parents: John Rothrock; Utopia Herron
- Education: Vanderbilt University
- Occupation: Librarian

Mary Utopia Rothrock (September 19, 1890 – January 30, 1976), was an American librarian and historian.

Born in Brick Church in Giles County, Tennessee, Rothrock grew up Trenton, Tennessee. She was the youngest of five children of John Rothrock, a Presbyterian minister, and his wife, Utopia (Herron) Rothrock. She attended public schools in Milan, Tennessee, and Somerville, Tennessee, and the Ward Seminary in Nashville. She graduated from Vanderbilt University in 1912 with a Master of Science degree, and the New York School of Library Science in Albany in 1914. While in New York, she worked as an assistant at the New York State Library. Rothrock returned to Tennessee in 1915 to serve as Head of Circulation at the Cossitt Library in Memphis.

In 1916, Knoxville businessman and philanthropist Calvin M. McClung persuaded her to move to Knoxville to be Chief Librarian of the Lawson McGhee Library. She served in that position until 1933. During her tenure, she oversaw the establishment of the branch system that would later evolve into the Knox County Public Library system. She was also instrumental in persuading McClung to donate his personal collection to the library system, creating the Calvin M. McClung Historical Collection. This collection provided the core of the East Tennessee Historical Society (ETHS), of which Rothrock was a charter member.

Rothrock supervised the Tennessee Valley Authority libraries from 1934 to 1948. She afterward returned to the Knox County Library system, working as the Knox County Librarian from 1949 to 1955. After retiring, she remained active with the library system in some capacity until her death in 1976.

Rothrock wrote and edited numerous historical books and articles about Tennessee, East Tennessee, and Knoxville. In 1929, her article, "Carolina Traders Among the Overhill Cherokees, 1690–1760," appeared in the inaugural issue of the ETHS's annual Publications. She edited the first major comprehensive history of Knox County and Knoxville, The French Broad-Holston County: A History of Knox County, Tennessee, in 1946. She also wrote two school textbooks, Discovering Tennessee and This Is Tennessee: A School History.

== Career ==
Rothrock became President of the Tennessee Library Association (TLA) in 1920 and was elected a second time in 1928.

In 1929 she organized and co-founded with Tommie Dora Barker and Charlotte Templeton the Southeastern Library Association (SELA) in Chattanooga in 1920 and became its first President.

In 1946, she served as president of the American Library Association (ALA). In 1976 she was awarded American Library Association Honorary Membership.

== Selected publications ==
- Rothrock, Mary U. (1963). This is Tennessee: A school history. Knoxville, Tenn.: M. U. Rothrock.
- Rothrock, Mary U. (March 1949). "Wings of Thought". Library Journal. 74: 458.
- Rothrock, Mary U. (January 1947). "Our Common, Unifying Objective". ALA Bulletin. 41 (1): 12.
- Rothrock, Mary U. (December 1937). "Tomorrow's Rural Libraries". ALA Bulletin. 31: 961–964.
- Rothrock, Mary U. (August 1947). "On Some Library Questions of Our Time". ALA Bulletin. 41 (7): 241–246.
- Rothrock, Mary U. (May 1, 1935). "The Tennessee Library Plan". Library Journal. 60: 373–375.
- Rothrock, Mary U.; Luttrell, Laura Elizabeth (1921). Calvin Morgan McClung historical collection of books, pamphlets, manuscripts, pictures and maps relating to early western travel and the history and genealogy of Tennessee and other southern states. Knoxville, Tenn.: Knoxville Lithographing Co.

Non-profit organization positions
Preceded by Ralph A. Ulveling	President of the American Library Association; 1946–1947	Succeeded by Paul North Rice
