= North Carolina Collection =

Coordinates: 35°54′34.69″N 79°2′59.38″W

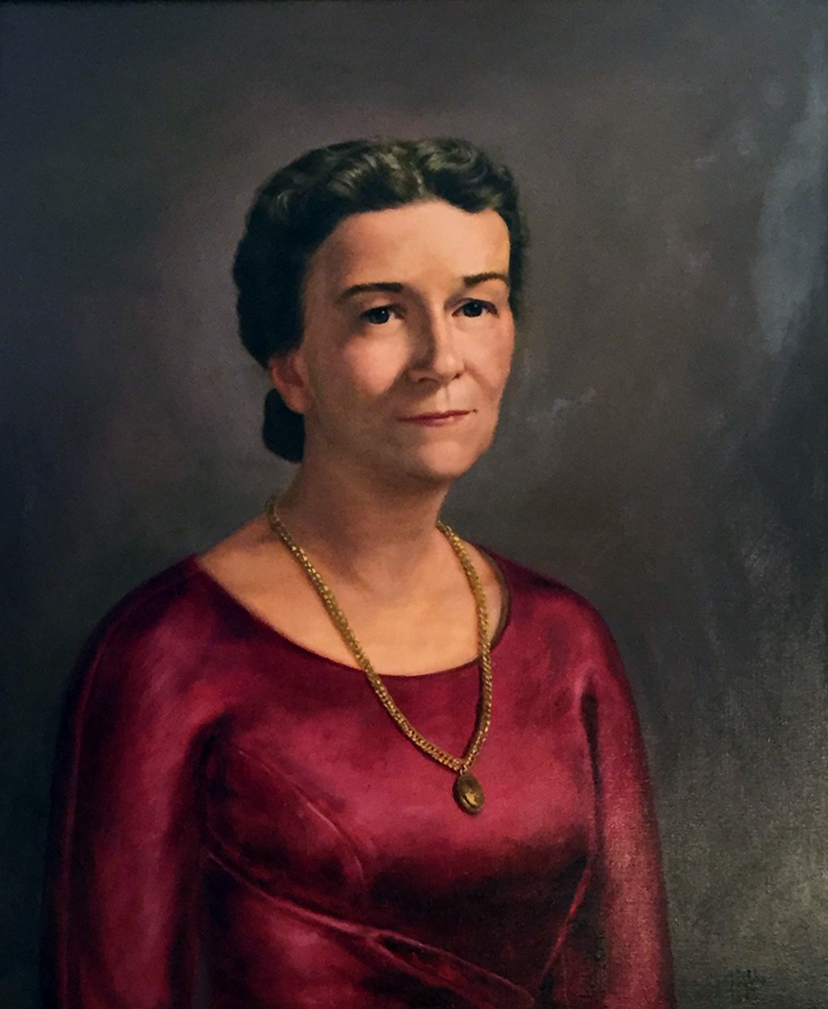
Mary Lindsay Thornton became the North Carolina Collection's first curator in 1917.

The North Carolina Collection is the largest collection of traditional library materials documenting a single state. It is part of the Louis Round Wilson Special Collections Library at the University of North Carolina at Chapel Hill. The origins of the collection began in 1844 with the creation of the North Carolina Historical Society. The collection formally came into existence after a donation from John Sprunt Hill in 1930 totaling $25,000. The collection includes The Thomas Wolfe Collection and The Sir Walter Raleigh Collection.

== History ==
In 1844, University President David Lowry Swain founded the North Carolina Historical Society in order to stimulate students' interest in history, but he also strove to collect every book, pamphlet, and newspaper in the state of North Carolina in existence. He called his collection the North Carolina Collection, and it was later inherited first by University President Kemp P. Battle and later by University Librarian Louis Round Wilson and philanthropist John Sprunt Hill in 1930. An earlier donation by Sprunt in 1917 paid for the collection's first curator, Mary Lindsay Thornton, and his later gift of the Carolina Inn and uptown business properties allowed the North Carolina Collection to rely on trust funds instead of legislative appropriations for its funding.

== Collecting scope ==
The collection's acquisition policy calls for collecting materials related to North Carolina. Its holdings include over 300,000 books and pamphlets, 6,000 printed maps, 50,000 reels of microfilm, 4,000,000 photographs, and 35,000 museum artifacts. The collection is divided into three areas: the Research Library, the Gallery, and the Photographic Archives. The Research Library's holdings contain items about the state of North Carolina from its earliest days to the present. The Gallery displays items from the North Carolina Collection and contains three historical rooms, each depicting a different part of North Carolina's past. The Photographic Archives documents the state of North Carolina through its estimated 4 million photographs, representing many types of photos, from daguerreotype to digital.

== Gallery ==
The North Carolina Collection Gallery, located on the library's second floor, hosts exhibits that feature literature, photographs, and artifacts from the North Carolina Collection’s holdings including furnishings in three historic rooms. Gallery exhibitions are free and open to the public.
