= Louis Round Wilson Library =

Wilson Library
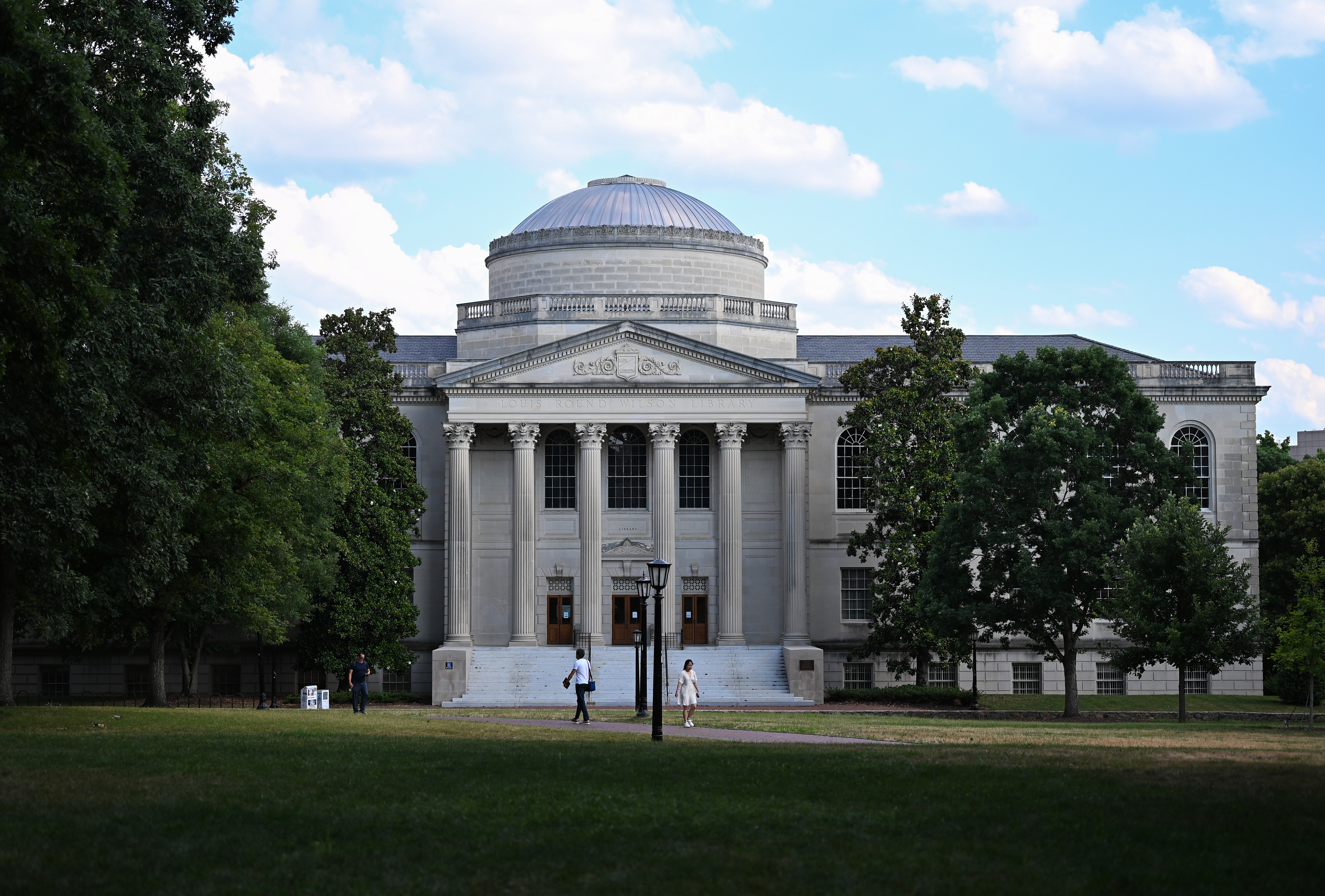
- Wilson Library opened in 1929 and serves as the special collections library at the University of North Carolina.
- Interactive map of Wilson Library
- Location: University of North Carolina, Chapel Hill, North Carolina
- Coordinates: 35°54′34.9308″N 79°2′59.0568″W
- Built: 1927–1929
- Website: Wilson Library

The Louis Round Wilson Library is a library at the University of North Carolina at Chapel Hill. Completed in 1929, it served as the university's main library until 1984. It houses several special collections. The dome rises 85 feet over the university's South Quadrangle.

== History ==
The library was constructed between 1927 and 1929 at the far end of the South Quadrangle at a time of rapid growth for the university. Twenty-three buildings were constructed on the UNC campus between 1920 and 1931. Architect Arthur Cleveland Nash, together with William Kendall of famed firm McKim, Mead, and White, designed the neo-classical building in the Beaux-arts style. The building follows the standard plan of Carnegie libraries across the United States. In 1923, the Carnegie Corporation reported having no objection to the university building a new library and converting the 1907 Carnegie-funded library to other uses. However, the university did not apply for library construction funds in 1924 for the new building. Wilson Library was named for Louis Round Wilson, the university's first librarian, in 1956. Prior to the naming, the building had been referred to as "the library."

Wilson had campaigned for a new library building for most of the 1920s, wanting a building that would house enough books to make it a library of national distinction. Ten days after the building opened on October 19, 1929, the stock market crashed. State support for the university dropped, which meant that Wilson had to raise money for the library through private donations and foundation support. Some of the gifts donated during the Depression created some of the library's most distinctive collections.

The original building was 219 feet long by 140 feet deep. The first addition was made in 1952, with two more in 1976 and 1984. It served as the university's main library until 1984, when Davis Library opened. The Wilson Library mainly serves as a special collections library. Its North Carolina Collection is the largest concerning a single state in the nation.

== Collections ==
- Rare Book Collection – The Rare Book Collections began in 1929 and contains over 200,000 printed materials, as well as original graphics, medieval and Renaissance manuscripts, and literary and historical papers.
- Southern Historical Collection – Established in 1930, the Southern Historical Collection documents the American South through its more than 15 million items and 4,600 discrete collections.
- North Carolina Collection – Created in 1930, the North Carolina Collection is the largest collection in existence documenting a single state.
- University Archives – UARMS collects, preserves, and provides access to the records of the University of North Carolina.
- Southern Folklife Collection – The Southern Folklife Collection opened in 1989 and documents vernacular music, art, and culture related to the American South.
