= Charles E. Beard =

American librarian

- Born: November 17, 1940
- Died: June 2, 2004 (aged 63)
- Occupation: Librarian

Charles E. Beard (November 17, 1940 – June 2, 2004) was a notable librarian from the state of Georgia.

== Career ==
Charles E. Beard was born in 1940 and grew up in Alabama. He received his B.A. from the University of Alabama and his M.S.L.S. from Florida State University.

He began working at the Jacksonville Public Library in 1964, went into the Army and was a librarian there, and became an academic librarian in 1966 at University of Alabama Libraries. He remained an academic librarian the rest of his life.

He became Director of Libraries at what was then West Georgia College (now the University of West Georgia) in 1978 and held this position until he retired in 2004.

During Beard's tenure as Library Director, he was very active at the national level with the American Library Association and the White House Conference on Library Information and Services.

He was also an integral part in the creation of the GALILEO system. GALILEO stands for Georgia Library Learning Online and is a virtual library with over one hundred databases and is available to K12 users as well as most higher education systems in Georgia.

Beard battled illness for months prior to his retirement and his retirement party was advanced to May 28, 2004, instead of the date that marked his twenty-sixth year of service, June 30. Beard's respiratory condition worsened right before his retirement party and he was unable to attend. More than 100 people came to the party to honor him. On June 2, 2004, Beard died at Emory Hospital in Atlanta. He is buried in Scottsboro, Alabama.

== Legacy ==
Beard was President of the Southeastern Library Association. He served twice as the Georgia Library Association's president.

Beard was the lead in developing Georgia Library Learning Online (GALILEO), an online resource for Georgia libraries, connecting them all in one virtual library.

The Georgia Library Association renamed their Library Advocacy Award the Charles Beard Library Advocacy Award. GLA also named one of their scholarships after him; The Beard Scholarship, which provides financial assistance to those pursuing a master's degree in Library Science who “inspire and motivate their peers in the profession and in professional associations.”

The Southeastern Library Association awards the SELA Charles E Beard Award to honor an individual outside the library profession who has made a significant contribution to the development or promotion of libraries in the Southeast.
