= Milton J. Ferguson =

American librarian

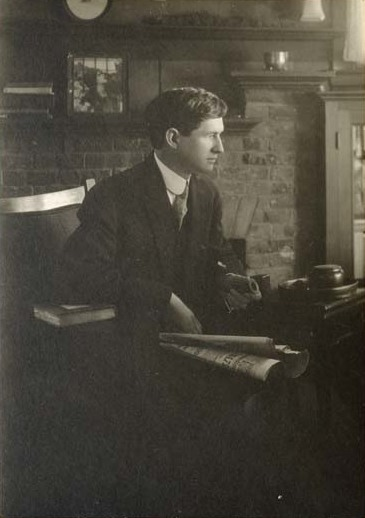

President of the American Library Association
- In office 1938–1939
- Preceded by: Harrison Warwick Craver
- Succeeded by: Ralph Munn

Personal details
- Born: Milton James Ferguson; April 11, 1879 Hubbardstown, West Virginia, US
- Died: October 23, 1954 (aged 75)
- Education: University of Oklahoma
- Occupation: Librarian

Milton James Ferguson (April 11, 1879 – October 23, 1954) was an American librarian. He graduated from the University of Oklahoma in 1906, and served as librarian of the University of Oklahoma from 1902 to 1907. He helped organize and was elected the first president of the Oklahoma Library Association (1907–08).

He was California State Librarian (1917–1930) and President of the California Library Association in 1919. He wrote about the development of county libraries. In 1926 Ferguson was an honorary member of the California Society of Printmakers (né Etchers). Ferguson also worked for the Carnegie Corporation making library surveys in Africa.

He was Chief librarian of the Brooklyn Public Library from 1930- 1949. In 1933-34 he served as President of the New York Library Association.

In 1938–39, Ferguson was president of the American Library Association.

Non-profit organization positions
Preceded by Harrison Warwick Craver	President of the American Library Association; 1938–1939	Succeeded by Ralph Munn
