= Malcolm Glenn Wyer =

American librarian and president of the American Library Association

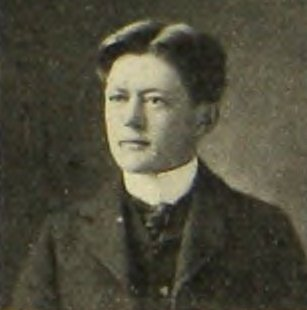

President of the American Library Association
- In office 1936–1937
- Preceded by: Louis Round Wilson
- Succeeded by: Harrison Warwick Craver

Personal details
- Born: August 21, 1877 Concordia, Kansas, US
- Died: December 31, 1965 (aged 88)
- Education: University of Minnesota
- Occupation: Librarian

Malcolm Glenn Wyer (August 21, 1877 – December 31, 1965) was an American librarian and the president of the American Library Association from 1936 to 1937. Wyer was born in Concordia, Kansas, and moved with his family to Minnesota because of health problems caused by malarial fever. He graduated from Minneapolis Central High School and went to the University of Minnesota, where he received his B A. in 1899 and M.A. in 1901. In 1903, Wyer received a Library Science degree from New York State Library School.

== Career ==
Wyer began working in libraries in 1900 as an assistant at the University of Minnesota. After graduating from New York State Library School, his first position was as a librarian at Colorado College. In 1904, he left Colorado to serve as the acting librarian at the University of Iowa, and he was appointed to that role in 1906. Wyer left Iowa to be a librarian at the University of Nebraska from 1913 to 1924. He left Nebraska briefly from 1918 to 1919 to serve as the assistant to the director for the American Library Association Library War Service. In 1924, Wyer became the city librarian in Denver, Colorado, where he worked until he retired in 1951.

While in Denver, Wyer founded a Bibliographical Center for Research in 1934, the Western History Department in 1935, and the University of Denver School of Librarianship. Wyer served as dean of the school from 1931 to 1948 as well as the director of libraries at the University of Denver during that same time.

During his career, Wyer served as president of the Iowa Library Association, the Nebraska Library Association, the Nebraska Library Commission, the Colorado Library Association and the American Library Association as well as receiving numerous honors and honorary degrees that continued until his death in 1965.

== Awards and honors ==
- Honorary Doctorate in Library Science from the University of Nebraska (1931)
- Honorary Doctorate of Letters from Colorado College (1938)
- Honorary Doctorate of Letters from University of Denver (1958)

Non-profit organization positions
Preceded by Louis Round Wilson	President of the American Library Association; 1936–1937	Succeeded by Harrison Warwick Craver
