= Mary Lindsay Thornton =

American librarian and curator (1891–1973)

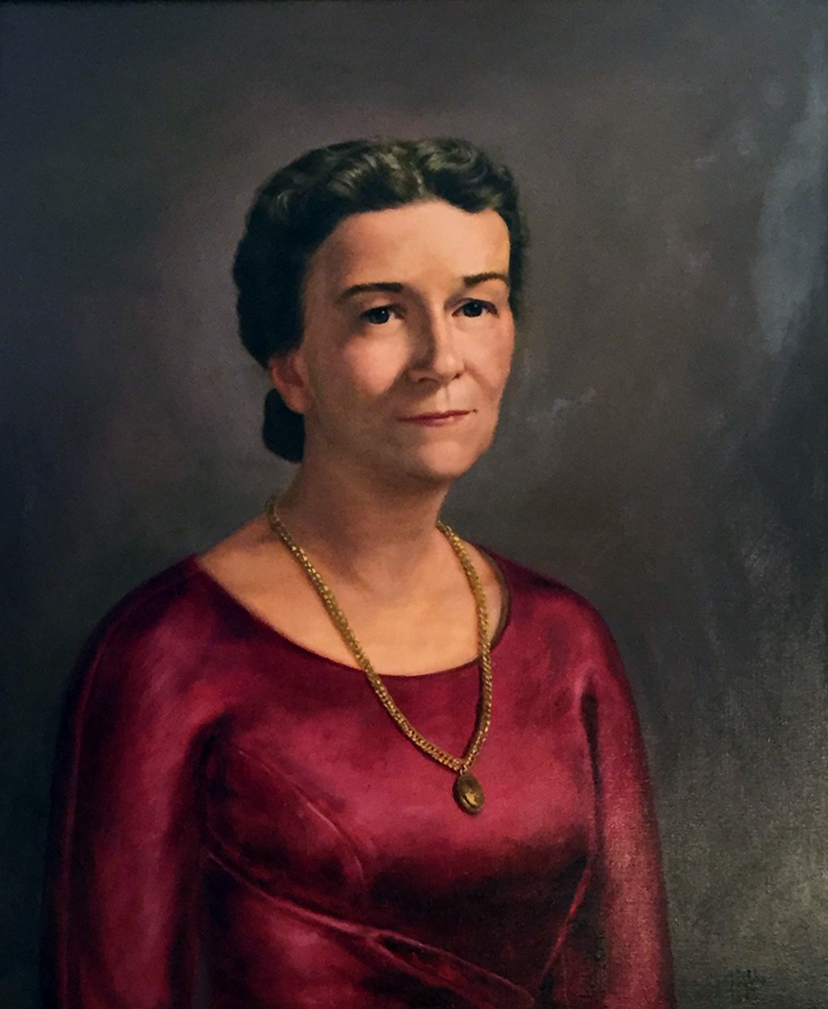
Mary Lindsay Thornton

Mary Lindsay Thornton (June 12, 1891 – September 27, 1973) was the first curator of the North Carolina Collection at the University of North Carolina at Chapel Hill. First appointed in 1917, Thornton served as the curator until 1958.

== Background ==
Mary Louise Thornton was born on June 12, 1891, in Louisa County, Virginia, in a home called Cuckoo House that had been in the family for many generations. She was the one of four children of William Percy Thornton and Elizabeth Pendleton. The family moved to Salisbury, North Carolina, and then Atlanta, Georgia. Because she did not like her name, Mary Louise changed her name to Mary Lindsay in honor of her great-grandmother; her name was never legally changed. Thornton graduated from the Atlanta Girls High School and the Carnegie Library School of Atlanta (later affiliated with Emory University). She was a librarian at the University of Georgia from 1913 to 1917.

== University of North Carolina ==
Thornton took a position as the first librarian of the North Carolina Collection in 1917. At the time, the collection was located in an upstairs room in the university's Carnegie Library and contained 1,000 books and 500 pamphlets. The following year, the university purchased Stephen B. Weeks' collection of North Caroliniana, which added an additional 10,000 items. Though she would have periodic offers for higher paying jobs, she chose to remain at the North Carolina Collection for decades. She also earned two additional degrees from the University of North Carolina during her time as an employee. Her thesis for her M.A. in History was entitled Public printing in North Carolina from 1749 to 1815.

During her time as the curator, the North Carolina Collection added donations from John Sprunt Hill and Thomas Wolfe's family. Additionally, Thornton was an author, having written two books, Official Publications of the Colony and State of North Carolina, 1749–1939 and A Bibliography of North Carolina, 1589–1956. She also wrote numerous journal articles.

Thornton continued at the university until 1958.
