= Ella May Thornton =

American librarian (1885–1971)

President, National Association of State Libraries

Personal details
- Born: on April 28, 1885 Atlanta, Georgia, U.S.
- Died: October 11, 1971 (aged 86) Atlanta
- Education: Carnegie Library School of Atlanta
- Occupation: Georgia State Librarian
- Awards: Woman of the Year in Professions (1951)

Ella May Thornton (April 28, 1885 – October 11, 1971) was an American librarian who served as the State Librarian of Georgia; president of the Atlanta Library Club; and in 1936, became the president of the National Association of State Libraries.

== Early life and education ==
Ella May Thorton was born in Atlanta, Georgia, on April 28, 1885. She was the daughter of Eugene Hascal Thornton (born May 31, 1848, in Clay County, Georgia;corporal, Pruden's Battery, Confederate States Army; board member, superintendent and secretary, Confederate Soldiers' Home; died December 14, 1921) and Emma (Neal) Thornton (born April 25, 1844, in Zebulon, Georgia ; died March 29, 1918). Granddaughter of Richard and Elizabeth (Eley) Thornton of Clay County, Georgia, and of John Neal (born September 19, 1796, in Warren County, Georgia; member, Pike County, Internal Improvement Convention, 1831; member, Pike County, Convention, 1833; member, Pike County, House of Representatives, 1838, 1839; died January 4, 1886, in Atlanta, Georgia) and Mary Jane (Campbell) Neal (born April 15, 1817). Great-granddaughter of David Neal (captain in the Revolution; married Apr. 2, 1780) and Joyce (McCormick) Neal.

She was educated in the private schools of Atlanta; Walnut Hill School, Natick, Massachusetts, (3 years); and the Carnegie Library School of Atlanta.

== Career ==
Thornton served as Second Assistant Librarian, Georgia State Library, 1909–14; Legislative Reference Librarian, Georgia State Library, 1911–18; Assistant State Librarian, 1919–25; and became the State Librarian on January 6, 1926, retiring in 1954. During the period of 1926–28, she was the Secretary-Treasurer of the Southeastern Library Association. She was also a member of the Georgia Library Association and the American Library Association, as well as a member ex-officio of the Georgia Library Commission and Georgia State Historical Commission.

She compiled and published Georgia State Constitution and Amendments, 1917, 1925; and Georgia Election Laws, 1926.

== Personal life ==
She was Baptist.

Thornton never married. She died in Atlanta on October 11, 1971.

The Ella May Thornton letters are held in a collection by the University of Georgia.

== Awards and honors ==
- 1951, Woman of the Year in Professions

== Selected works ==
- 1917, A Checklist of Georgia State Publications
- 1925, A Checklist of Georgia State Publications
- 1929, A Checklist of Georgia State Publications
- 1932, A Checklist of Georgia State Publications
- 1941, Georgia Women: 1840-1940, Record of Achievement
