= Anna Smith =

Anna Smith may refer to:

- Anna Smith Strong (1740–1812), American spy
- Anna Tolman Smith (1840–1917), American educator
- Ann Bedsole (born Margaret Anna Smith, 1930–2025), American politician
- Anna Deavere Smith (born 1950), American actress and academic
- Anna Nicole Smith (1967–2007), model and actress
- Anna Bustill Smith (1862–1945), suffragist and genealogist
- Anna Harris Smith (1843–1929), American animal welfare activist
- Anna Young Smith (1756–1780), American poet
- Anna Smith (cricketer) (born 1978), New Zealand cricketer
- Anna Smith (tennis) (born 1988), British tennis player
- Anna Smith (critic) (21st century), British film critic
- Anna Smith, known professionally as Anna Acton (born 1977), English actress

== See also ==
- Anne Smith (disambiguation)
- Annie Smith (disambiguation)
