= Harrison Warwick Craver =

American librarian and educator

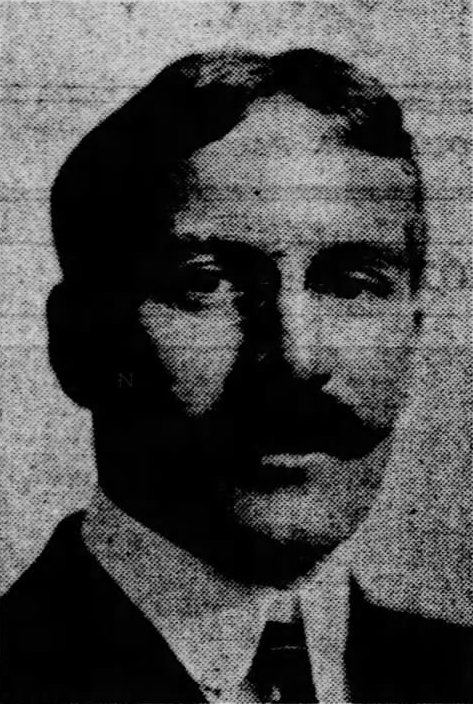

President of the American Library Association
- In office 1937–1938
- Preceded by: Malcolm Glenn Wyer
- Succeeded by: Milton James Ferguson

Personal details
- Born: August 10, 1875 Owaneco, Illinois, USA
- Died: July 26, 1951 (aged 75)
- Education: Rose Polytechnic Institute
- Occupation: Librarian

Harrison Warwick Craver (August 10, 1875 – July 26, 1951) was an American librarian and educator. Craver was a chemist and metallurgist. He graduated from the Rose Polytechnic Institute in 1895 with a specialization in industrial chemistry. He joined the staff of the Carnegie Library of Pittsburgh in 1900 to organize the Technology Department. In 1908, Craver was elected the librarian of the Carnegie Library of Pittsburgh where he served until 1917 when he was appointed director of the United Engineering Societies of New York and the combined libraries of the American Society of Civil Engineers.

Craver served as president of the American Library Association from 1937 to 1938.

Non-profit organization positions
Preceded by Malcolm Glenn Wyer	President of the American Library Association; 1937–1938	Succeeded by Milton James Ferguson
