= Meditation by the Sea =

1860s painting

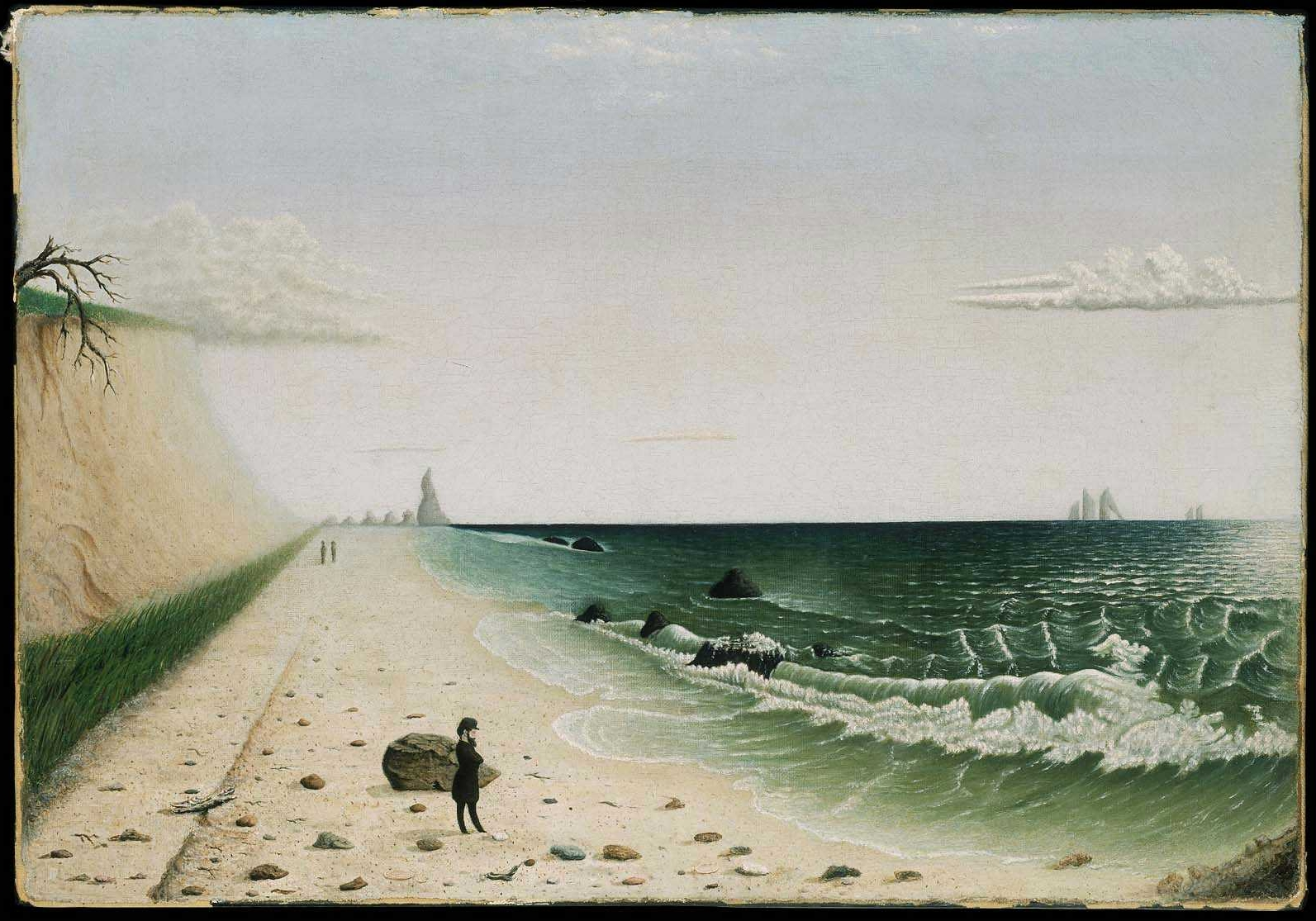
- Artist: unknown
- Year: early 1860s
- Medium: Oil on canvas
- Dimensions: 34.61 cm × 49.85 cm (13 5/8 in × 19 5/8 in)
- Location: Museum of Fine Arts, Boston, Massachusetts, United States

Meditation by the Sea is an American folk art oil painting by an unknown artist from the early 1860s.

The painting is derived from a wood engraving of Gay Head, Martha's Vineyard by David H. Strother in the September 21, 1860 issue of Harper's New Monthly.

== Description ==
Though the receding cliff suggests the artist's familiarity with one-point perspective, the rest of the view is distorted to suggest the vastness of the scene. The artist creates a surreal image by juxtaposing the lone, brooding foreground figure with tiny silhouettes in the distance. Though solitary figures are common in the contemporary luminist paintings of the Hudson River School (to which the artist was likely exposed), the artist's approach to the subject is markedly different. They create a sense of foreboding using a vast horizon and an ominous hanging branch. Based on the date of the Strother engraving, this painting was probably painted near the outbreak of the Civil War; a sense of dread is visible in the figure's "confrontation with the omnipotence of nature and God".

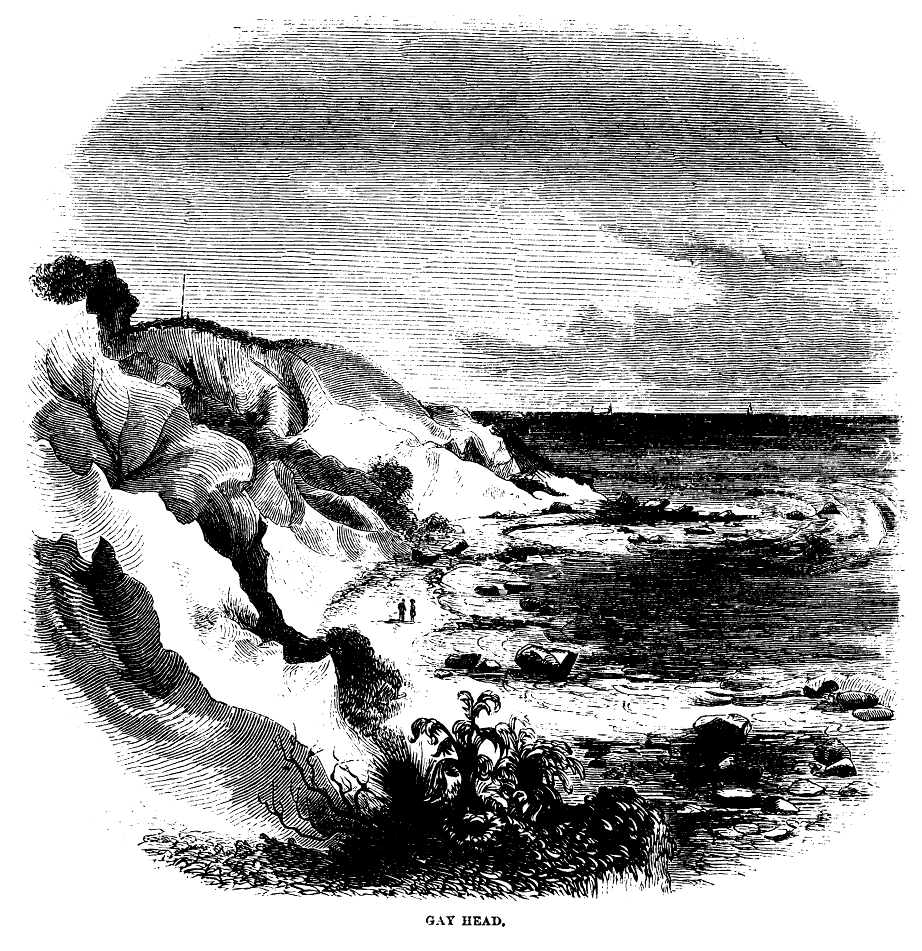
The engraving in Harper's New Monthly that inspired Meditation by the Sea

== Acquisitions ==
Art collector Maxim Karolik bought the painting from J.B. Neumann for $650 in 1943; it was one of the first 19th-century paintings he acquired. In 1945 Karolik donated the piece to the Boston Museum of Fine Arts to inaugurate the M. and M. Karolik Collection of American Art, 1815–1865.
