= David Hunter Strother =

American author and illustrator (1816–1888)

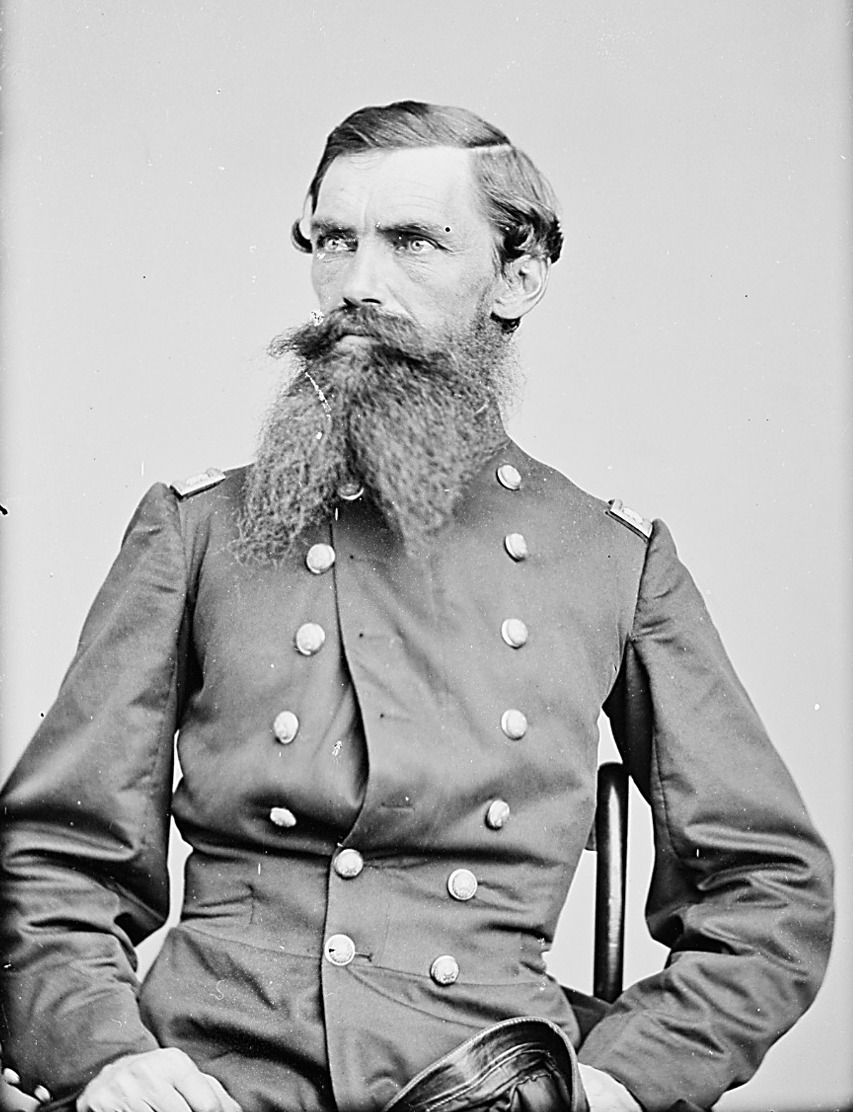
- Strother during Civil War
- Born: David Hunter Strother; September 26, 1816; Martinsburg, Virginia (now West Virginia), U.S.
- Died: March 8, 1888 (aged 71); Charles Town, West Virginia, U.S.
- Resting place: Green Hill Cemetery, Martinsburg, West Virginia
- Occupations: Journalist, artist, politician, military officer, diplomat
- Spouses: Anne Doyne Wolfe; Mary Elliott Hunter

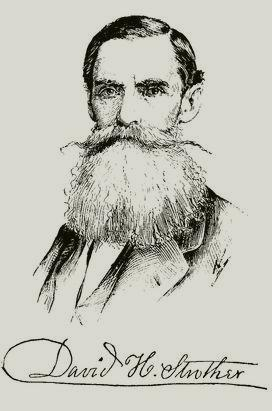
A sketch of Col. Strother

David Hunter Strother (September 26, 1816 – March 8, 1888) was an American journalist, artist, brevet brigadier general, innkeeper, politician and diplomat from West Virginia. Both before and after the American Civil War (in which he was initially a war correspondent), Strother was a successful 19th-century American magazine illustrator and writer, popularly known by his pseudonym, "Porte Crayon" (French, porte-crayon: "pencil/crayon holder"). He helped his father operate a 400-guest hotel at Berkeley Springs, which was at the time the only spa accessible by rail in the mid-Atlantic states. A Union topographer and nominal cavalry commander during the war, Strother rose to the rank of brevet Brigadier General of Volunteers, and afterward restructured the Virginia Military Institute, as well as serving as U.S. consul in Mexico (1879–1885).

== Early and family life ==
Born in Martinsburg, Virginia (now West Virginia), in 1816 to Colonel John Strother and his wife Elizabeth Pendleton Hunter, David Strother was the first of their eight children and the only male to reach adulthood. Both sides of his family (especially his mother's) were among the First Families of Virginia and included prominent political and military leaders even before successful participation in the American Revolutionary War. His grandfather fought in the navy then army during that conflict before moving to Berkeley County, and his father was a lieutenant in the War of 1812, then led the Berkeley County militia as well as running a hotel. He served as first assistant clerk to his father-in-law (then clerk of the county's circuit court) and eventually county clerk, all for many years (although at least once defeated by Democrat Harrison Waite). His mother attended the local Presbyterian church, and his father the local Episcopal church; as an adult, Strother lost interest in sectarian religion.

Over his father's objection, 32-year-old David Strother married 19-year-old Anne Doyne Wolfe, daughter of a Martinsburg saddler, in 1849. The following year they had a daughter, Emily, who survived to adulthood and became the wife of John Brisben Walker. On May 6, 1861, he married Mary Elliott in Jefferson County, who bore sons David Hunter Strother Jr. (1866–1871) and John Strother (1868–1923). As many as six of his children may have died young, per tombstones.

== Education and early career ==
After some time at the Martinsburg academy, as well as his father's tutelage, David Strother traveled to Philadelphia to study drawing under Pietro Ancora at the Pennsylvania Academy of Fine Arts in 1829. He had not been robust enough to secure a place at the U.S. Military Academy at West Point. Strother spent a year (1832) at Jefferson College in Canonsburg, Pennsylvania. After desultory studies in law and medicine, and a continued inability to obtain a position at West Point, now because of his father's lack of political clout in the Jacksonian era, Strother and friend John Ranson in 1835 took a 500-mile (805 km) round-trip hike in the Blue Ridge and Appalachian Mountains, down to Natural Bridge and Rockbridge County, Virginia, and back up through the Shenandoah Valley, which changed his outlook on life.

In 1837–38, on the recommendation of Winchester's John Gadsby Chapman, Strother traveled to New York City to study painting under Samuel F. B. Morse, who later became more famous for inventing the telegraph. Strother traveled along the Ohio River and in the Midwest in 1838–1839 (visiting cousins in Louisville and St. Louis, as well as painting various portraits in Indiana and Illinois).

Having raised some money selling portraits, and his father also having borrowed money for the study trip, Strother embarked for Europe in the fall of 1839, traveling as a student and artist rather than an aristocrat. After briefly visiting England and spending more time in France (witnessing Napoleon's funeral in Paris), he completed an Italian itinerary Chapman had recommended. He also learned to his surprise that his father had forwarded his amusing letters home to the Martinsburg Gazette, where they acquired a devoted following. Strother returned to the United States in the spring of 1843, unable to continue to Greece and Turkey because of his father's financial reverses and the lack of work for expatriate Americans in Europe.

His father rebuilt the family's hotel in 1844–46, so it could serve 300–400 guests, including artists as well as politicians and society people, who could travel to Berkeley Springs on the Baltimore and Ohio Railroad (which reached Cumberland, Maryland, in 1844). David Strother owned a cottage at Berkeley Springs and assisted at the fashionable hotel during the summer season, but traveled in the off-season. At first, he went to Baltimore, where he was able to sell some paintings with the help of his cousin John Pendleton Kennedy. Strother continued to draw and paint portraits, and in the spring of 1845 went to New York, where he learned woodcut illustration under the direction of John G. Chapman, and the publishing business first at the S.G. Goodrich publishing factory, and later by illustrating a life of Gen. Winfield Scott and a reissue of one of Kennedy's books (Swallow Barn). With Gouverneur Kemble, he helped organize the Century Club for sketch artists.

By 1848, Strother was publishing landscapes and other scenes of his native state, then of other areas of America. He visited the historic sites of southeastern Virginia, including Williamsburg, Jamestown, and Yorktown, and saw the area as decayed, unlike the commercially expanding area in which he had been raised. In 1851 Strother bought a home, Norborne Hall, for his young family in Martinsburg, which became his winter home until the Civil War. Strother published in a variety of places before winning fame as both author and illustrator of a series of humorous travelogues which appeared in Harper's Monthly magazine. Commencing in 1853 and using the pen name "Porte Crayon", these articles included The Virginia Canaan (1853), Virginia Illustrated (1854–1855), North Carolina Illustrated (1857), A Winter in the South (1857–1858) and A Summer in New England (1860–1861).

After John Brown's Raid, Harper's Monthly commissioned the 43-year-old Strother to write and illustrate an article or series. Harpers Ferry was near his home, and he soon published an article about the flaming destruction of the armory and successful capture of the raiders by Virginia forces led by Lt. J. E. B. Stuart. Strother later published articles about the trial (during which his uncle served as prosecutor and at which a friend presided) and even sketched a death image of John Brown. Unlike more partisan writers, but like many future West Virginians, Strother abhorred the fanaticism of both the abolitionists and the Virginia militia.

== American Civil War ==
Having been raised in Martinsburg and with a sister married to the chief civil engineer of the Baltimore and Ohio Railroad (of crucial strategic importance to the Union and often a target of Confederate raiders), Strother supported the Union, as did his father and his mentor Gouverneur Kemble, although all five of his aunts' husbands supported the Confederacy. Though he hoped to remain neutral as a war correspondent and his native Berkeley County leaned toward the Confederacy (sending no delegates to the Wheeling Convention and raising five companies of Confederate volunteers, against two raised by Unionists), in June 1861 Strother volunteered as a topographer due to his detailed knowledge of the Shenandoah Valley.

By March 1862, as West Virginia continued its drive toward statehood, Strother received a commission as captain in the Union Army and was assigned to assist General Nathaniel Banks in the Valley campaign. In June 1862, he accepted a commission as Lt. Col. of the 3rd West Virginia Cavalry, and was the topographer on General Pope's staff during the Battle of Cedar Mountain and the Second Battle of Manassas. During the Antietam campaign, Strother served on General McClellan's staff until that officer was relieved in November 1862. Strother then returned to the staff of General Banks, seeing action at the siege of Port Hudson in Louisiana. During the Gettysburg campaign, he was back in Washington, unassigned, but promoted to colonel of his regiment (which he never commanded in the field).

Strother continued to document his wartime experiences in a detailed journal, some of which Harper's Monthly published after the war as "Personal Recollections of the War". His articles won praise for their objective viewpoint and humor.

On June 12, 1864, Col. Strother was chief of staff to his distant cousin General David Hunter, a fervent abolitionist who led the Shenandoah Valley Division of the West Virginia Department as Union forces struck at Lexington and Lynchburg. Unionists considered the Virginia Military Institute (VMI) in Lexington a cradle of secession ideals and Confederate officers. After shelling, Gen. Hunter ordered the institution torched. Strother sent a bronze statue of General George Washington off to Wheeling, considering it a trophy and indignant that it had adorned "a country whose inhabitants were striving to destroy a government which he founded." Following the end of the war Col. Strother shared the responsibility of having the statue returned to VMI in 1866.

Strother was involved in 30 battles, though never wounded. He resigned his commission on September 10, 1864, when General Hunter was replaced by General Philip Sheridan, whose scorched-earth strategies would be successful, but make him even more despised in the Valley. In August 1865, Strother was appointed a brevet brigadier general of volunteers and remained Adjutant General of Virginia militia into 1866. Following the war, Strother became Adjutant General of VMI and also served on the VMI Board of Visitors; in that capacity, he actively promoted the institution's reconstruction.

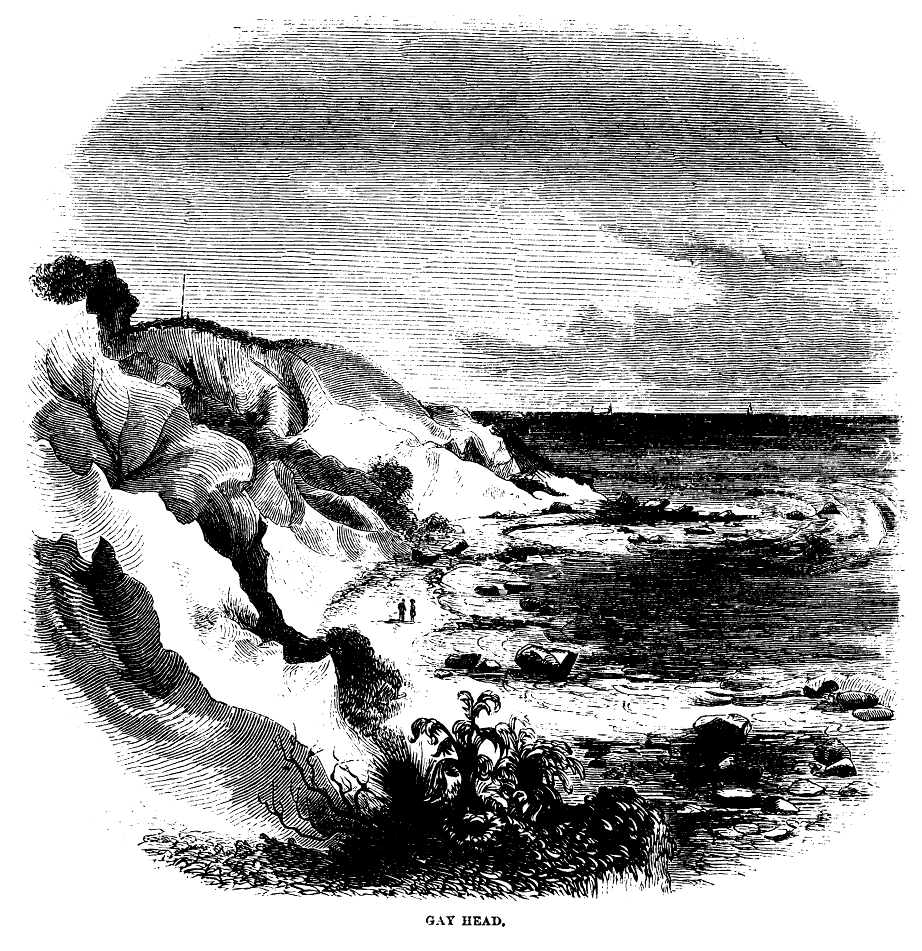
Gay Head (1860); engraving by David Hunter Strother

== Postbellum career ==
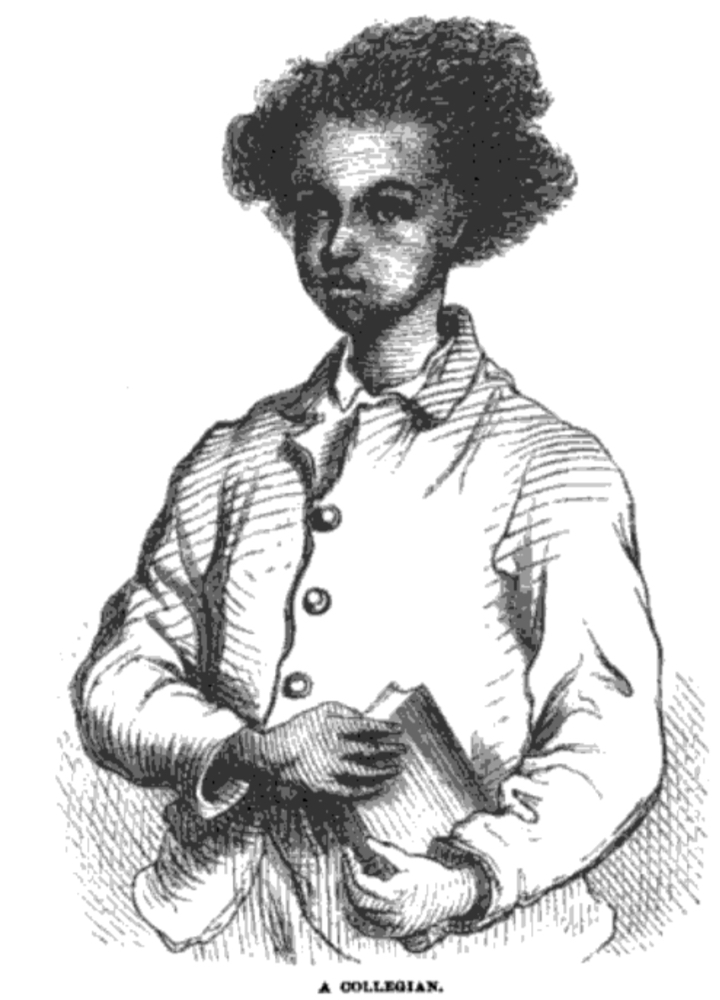
A Storer College student, 1874; sketch by Porte Crayon

After his father's death in January 1862, the war limited occupancy by Southern guests (other than the unwelcome Stonewall Jackson, who once used it as a base to shell the Baltimore and Ohio Railroad). Strother ran the family hotel, which a Baltimore company purchased in 1869 and refitted until John T. Trego purchased it in 1876. Strother continued to publish articles on a wide range of subjects – including politics, race relations, and Chief Sitting Bull. Harper's Monthly began publishing his illustrated Civil War memoirs in 1866, but discontinued the series after ten installments out of the 24 Strother planned (ending with his recollections of the Battle of Antietam). Strother also made many drawings of people he met or observed going about their daily lives. His ten-part series The Mountains in 1870 introduced Americans to the character and folkways of West Virginia.

Due to Strother's dedication to his home state, especially its rural character, he moved to Charleston for a short period in the early 1870s. There, he edited a newspaper and dedicated himself to furthering West Virginia's growth and well-being. He convinced state leaders to prioritize infrastructure initiatives. Strother became one of the first writers to understand West Virginia's unique place in both wanting to preserve its natural beauty while also encouraging economic and industrial growth.

In 1878, three years after Trego purchased what had once been the Strother family hotel, President Rutherford B. Hayes appointed David H. Strother the General Consul to Mexico. In that capacity, he hosted former General and President Ulysses S. Grant as well as dealt with the problems of various Americans in that country, as well as relations with the government of Mexican President Porfirio Díaz. He served until 1885, after which he returned to West Virginia.

== Death and legacy ==
Strother died in Charles Town, West Virginia, three years later, around the time a branch railroad line was built to the family's former hotel. The New York Times published an obituary which noted that his pen name "Porte Crayon" was a household name during the summit of his career. Strother is buried in Green Hill Cemetery in Martinsburg, West Virginia, which he had designed based on a French model in 1854, and where his first wife Anne Wolfe Strother and infant children were buried, and where his widow Mary Elliott Strother, who long survived him, would be buried nearly three decades later.

West Virginia University makes over 700 of his drawings available online. Mount Porte Crayon, in eastern West Virginia, honors Strother by way of his pseudonym, and the folk painting Meditation by the Sea (ca. 1862) is based on a Strother engraving.

In 1961, a biography of Strother by Washington and Lee University historian Cecil Eby Jr. was published by the University of North Carolina Press, and that press published a new edition of his Civil War diary in 1999. The Handley Library in Winchester, Virginia, has an unpublished diary of the months after Virginia's secession in April 1861. Kent State University Press published Strother's diaries as consul in Mexico in 2006.

The rebuilt family hotel burned down in 1898, but some outbuildings remained. Another hotel was subsequently built to utilize the springs, which were renowned for their waters and had been visited by George Washington and his uncle, Lawrence Washington. The whole area became Berkeley Springs State Park, revitalized again by the Civilian Conservation Corps and named on the National Register of Historic Places in 1976.

== Works ==
- Kennedy, Philip Pendleton (1853), The Blackwater Chronicle, A Narrative of an Expedition into the Land of Canaan in Randolph County, Virginia, Redfield, New York; Illustrated by David Hunter Strother.
- Strother, David Hunter (1853), "The Virginia Canaan", Harper's Magazine, 8:18–36.
- Strother, David Hunter (1857), Virginia Illustrated, containing "A Visit to the Virginian Canaan" and "The Adventures of Porte Crayon and his Cousins"; New York: Harper & Brothers, Publishers
- Strother, David Hunter (1872–73), "The Mountains", Harper's New Monthly Magazine, v. 44–51. A fictionalized travelogue based on actual experiences in the mountains of West Virginia.
- Strother, David Hunter (18??), "The Old South Illustrated", edited with introduction by Cecil B. Eby, Jr, University of North Carolina Press, 1959.
- Strother, David Hunter (1961), Virginia Yankee in the Civil War: The Diaries of David Hunter Strother; Edited by Cecil D. Eby, University of North Carolina Press.
- Strother, David Hunter (2006), Porte Crayon's Mexico: David Hunter Strother's Diaries in the Early Porfirian Era, 1879–1885, Edited by John E. Stealey III, Kent State University Press.

== Archival material ==
- The manusctripts and other materials of Strother biographer Cecil D. Eby Jr. are available at the West Virginia and Regional History Center at West Virginia University Libraries.

== See also ==
- Sinks of Gandy
- Seneca Rocks
- Canaan Valley
- Blackwater Falls State Park
