= Green Hill Cemetery Historic District =

Historic district in West Virginia, United States

- U.S. National Register of Historic Places
- U.S. Historic district
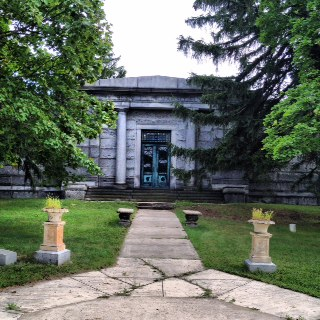

- Location within West Virginia Location within the United States
- Location: 486 E. Burke St., Martinsburg, West Virginia
- Coordinates: 39°27′13″N 77°57′20″W
- Area: 19 acres (7.7 ha)
- Architect: Small, Wendell S.; Strother, David Hunter
- Architectural style: Shingle Style
- MPS: Berkeley County MRA
- NRHP reference No.: 80004433
- Added to NRHP: December 10, 1980

Green Hill Cemetery Historic District is a national historic district located at Martinsburg, Berkeley County, West Virginia. The 15-acre (6.1 ha) site encompasses two contributing buildings, one contributing site, and 22 contributing objects. The rural cemetery was designed in 1854 by David Hunter Strother modeled on a French cemetery. It includes a Neoclassical Revival style mausoleum (1917–1918) and a Shingle Style caretaker's lodge (1901). The cemetery includes a number of notable monuments, as well as the graves of Strother and his family.

It was listed on the National Register of Historic Places in 1980.

Burials within the cemetery include that of actor Robert Barrat (1889–1970), George Meade Bowers (1863–1925), a Representative from 1916 to 1923 and David Hunter Strother (1816–1888), a noted artist, journalist and brevet brigadier general in the Union Army.
