= Charles R. Beard =

American politician (1870–1965)

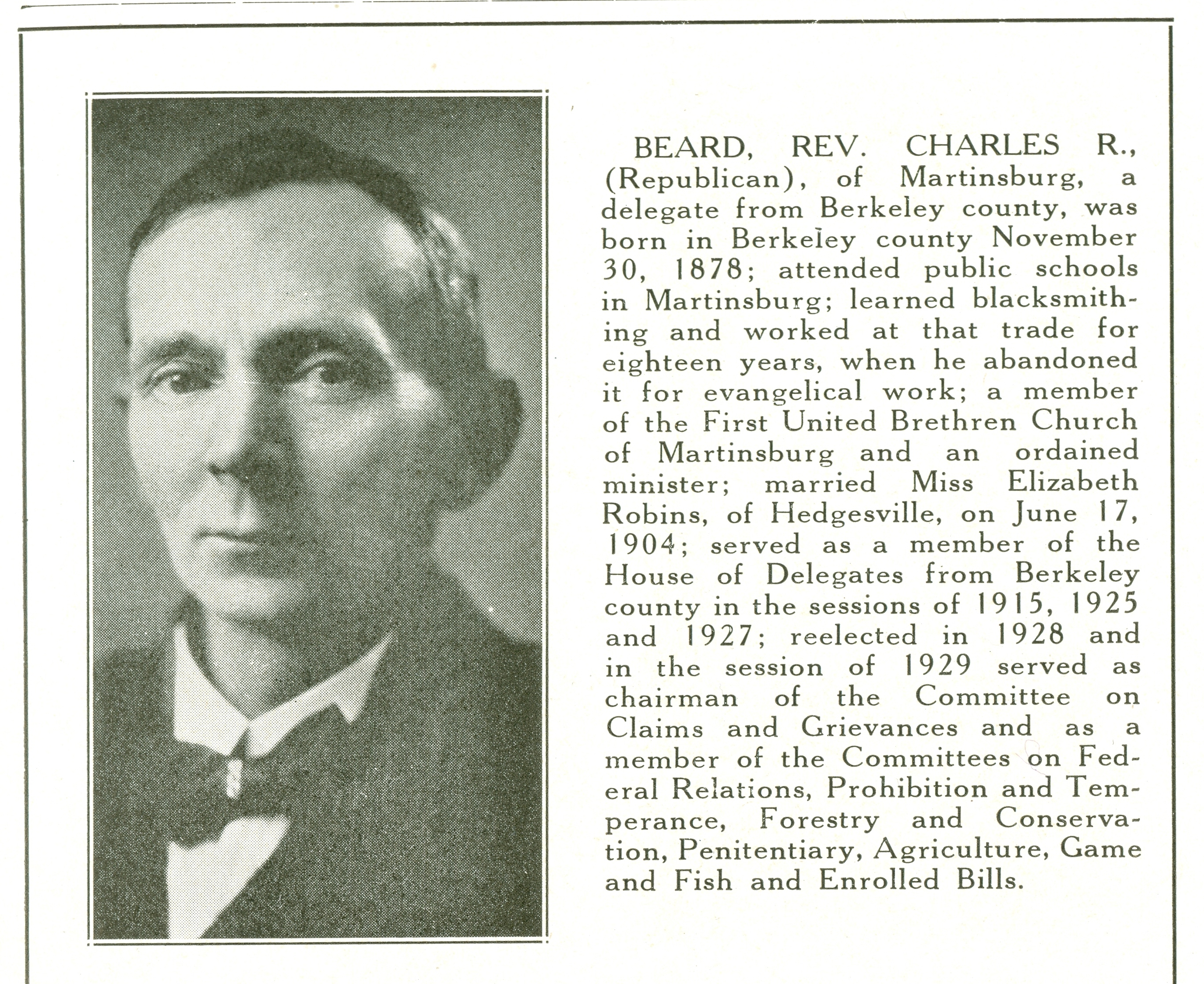

Charles R. Beard (1879–1965) was a blacksmith, minister and politician in West Virginia. He represented Berkeley County in the West Virginia House of Delegates for several terms. He was a Republican and lived in Martinsburg, West Virginia. He is buried at Green Hill Cemetery in Martinsburg.

Ge married Elizabeth Robins of Hedgesville. He served as chaplain in 1943.
