= Anne Smith (silversmith) =

British artist

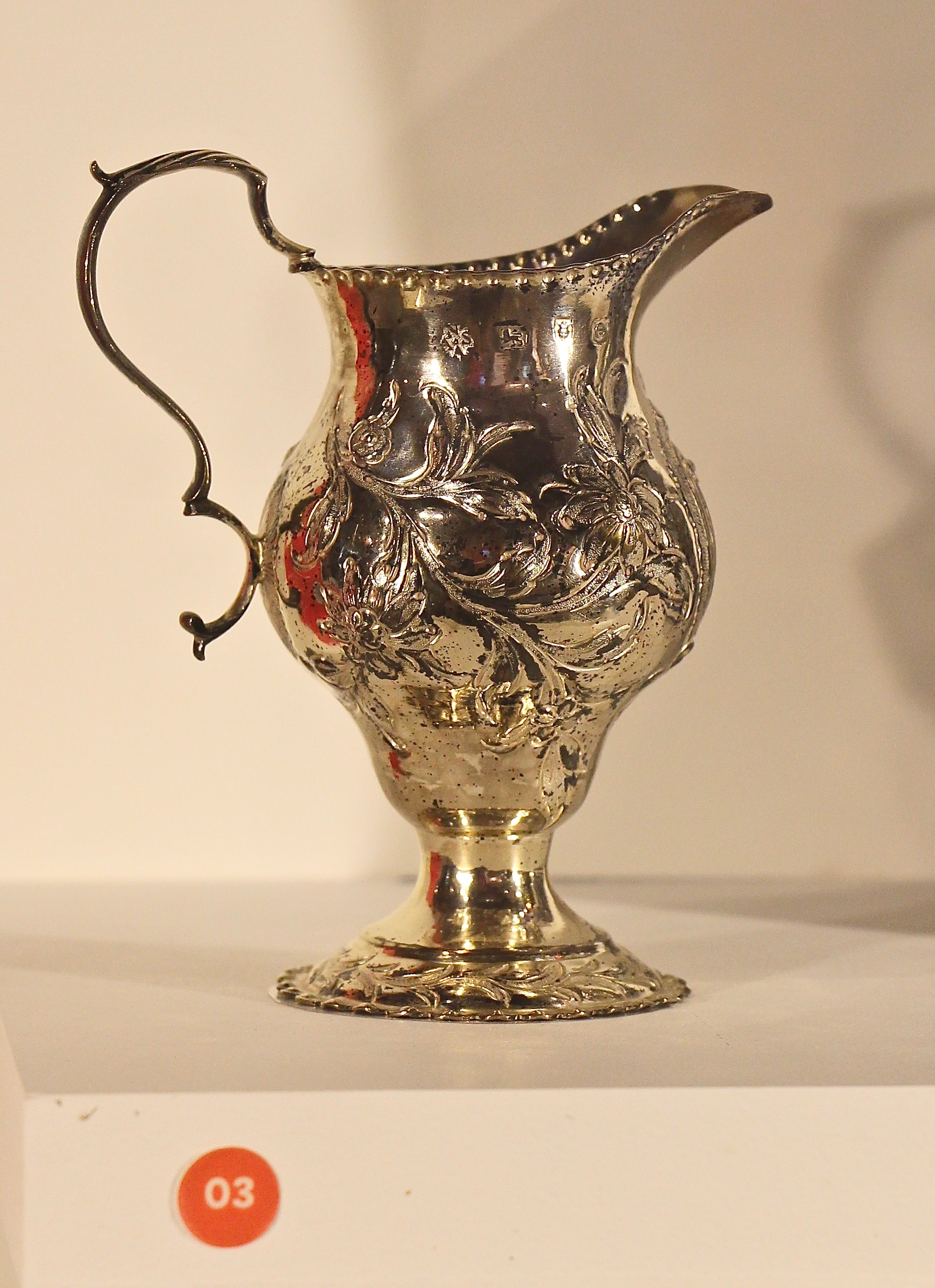
Water Pitcher, by Nathaniel Appleton & Anne Smith (1780)

Anne Smith was an English silversmith working in partnership with Nathaniel Appleton.

Unusually, Smith does not appear to have been the widow of a silversmith when she registered her mark on 26 July 1771; her marital status at the time is given instead as "unknown". She lived in Aldersgate Street and was classified as a smallworker. Her partnership with Appleton appears in the Parliamentary Report list of 1773. The couple specialized in the making of saltcellars and small cream jugs. A George III cream jug of 1773 and a set of four George III saltcellars of 1782 by the partners are owned by the National Museum of Women in the Arts, while a collection of saltcellars is owned by the National Gallery of Victoria. Numerous other pieces are known to exist as well.
