= National Association of State Libraries =

- Abbreviation: NASL
- Formation: 1889
- Dissolved: Succeeded by AASL 1957
- Type: Non-profit NGO
- Purpose: To develop and increase the usefulness and efficiency of the state libraries and other agencies performing library functions at the state level.

The National Association of State Libraries was established in 1889 to develop and increase the usefulness and efficiency of the state libraries and other agencies performing library functions at the state level in the United States.

== History ==
In the early nineteenth century, state legislatures identified a need to develop a system to catalog their state legal materials. In 1816, Pennsylvania formed the first state library followed the next year by Ohio. Within twelve years, 24 states had established similar institution. The role of these libraries rapidly expanded to include state and local records, federal documents and general reference materials. The National Association of State Libraries functioned as a section of the American Library Association between 1889 and 1898 when it became an independent organization.

The association was succeeded in 1957 by the American Association of State Library Agencies (AASL) as a division of the American Library Association. The State Library Agencies Division (SLAD) was founded on January 1, 1957 and in 1958 SLAD merged with the AASL to become the State Library Agency Division which subsequently changed its name to the Association of Specialized and Cooperative Library Agencies (ASCLA). In 1973 SLAD established the Chief Officers of State Library Agencies (COSLA) and in 1983 a compilation of American Library Laws was published.

== Notable people ==
- Ella May Thornton (1885-1971), president, National Association of State Libraries (1936)

== See also ==
- Association of Specialized and Cooperative Library Agencies
