= Charlotte Templeton =

American librarian

- Occupations: Librarian, educator

Charlotte Templeton was a librarian and lecturer in the United States. She was a lecturer at the Carnegie Library School of Atlanta. She served as a secretary of the Georgia Library Commission. After resigning that position she worked as a librarian at the public library in Greenville, South Carolina.

She wrote the article Who's Who in the A. L. A. (American Library Association) in 1930. She was one of the librarians who conceived the Southeastern Library Association on a trip to an A. L. A. conference.

In 1926, 1927, and 1928, she served as president of the South Carolina Library Association (SCLA). She published an article in the Christian Index on children's books and libraries.

She was a librarian at Atlanta University. She was involved with organizing the first Negro Library Conference. It was held in Kentucky.

One of her letters to her mom survives.
