= Carnegie Library School of Atlanta =

Former school for librarians, 1905–1988

The Carnegie Library School of Atlanta was a training school for librarians in Atlanta, Georgia. Emory University has a collection of the school's files. Originally known as Southern Library School, it opened at the Carnegie Library on September 20, 1905, with Anne Wallace as its director. It affiliated with Emory University in 1925 and remained the only nationally accredited library school until 1930. It closed in 1988.

In 1921, the Director of the Carnegie Library School, Tommie Dora Barker, opened the Auburn Avenue Branch Library, the first branch library for blacks in Atlanta. A Carnegie library, it was located in the Sweet Auburn neighborhood. The Auburn Avenue Research Library on African American Culture and History succeeded it.

== Alumni ==
- Ella May Thornton (1885–1971), Georgia State Librarian
- Mary Lindsay Thornton (1891–1973), first curator of the North Carolina Collection at the University of North Carolina at Chapel Hill
