= Louis Round Wilson =

American librarian (1876–1979)

Lewis Round Wilson
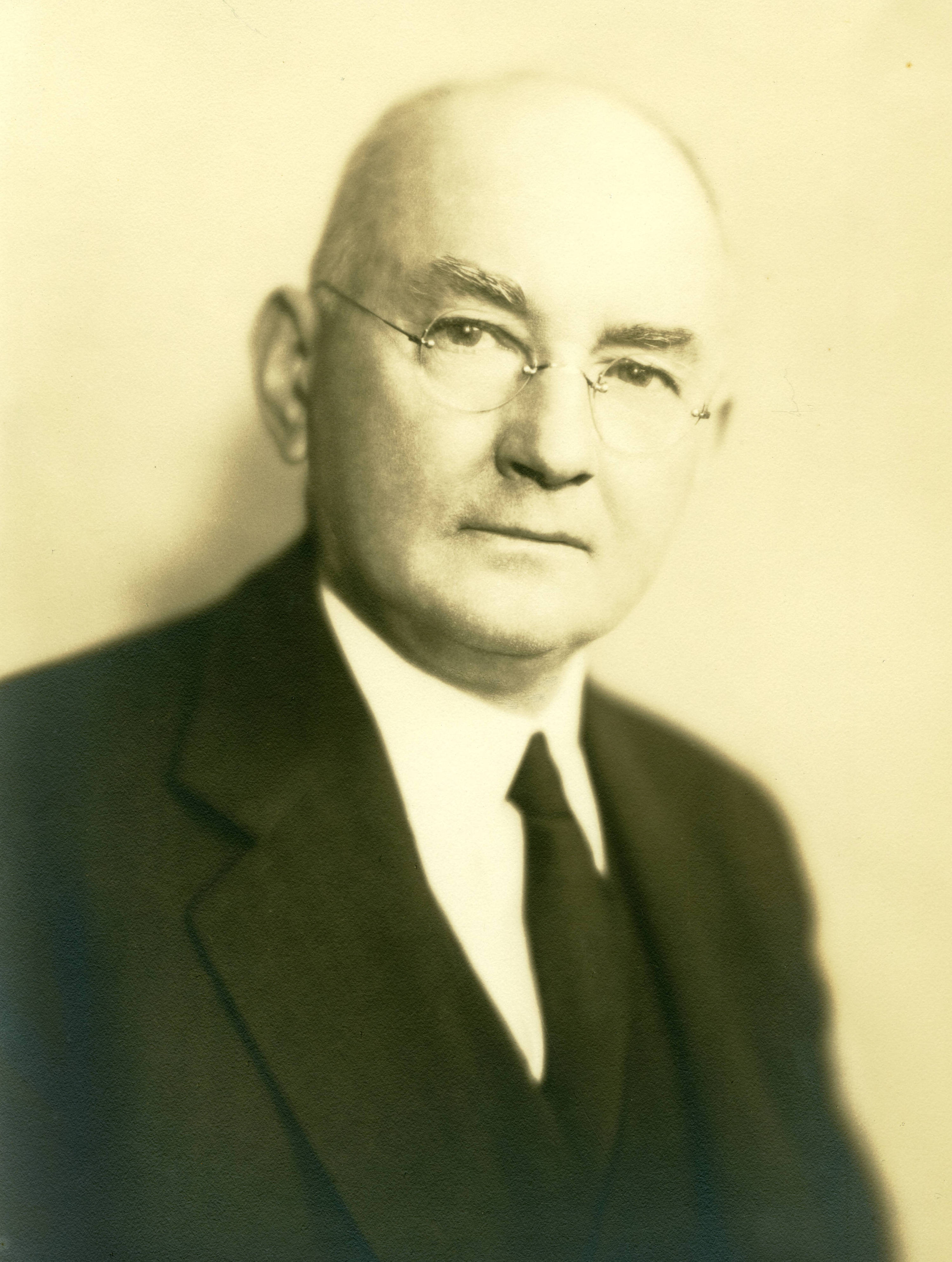

President of the American Library Association
- In office 1935–1936
- Preceded by: Charles H. Compton
- Succeeded by: Malcolm Glenn Wyer

Personal details
- Born: December 27, 1876 Lenoir, North Carolina, U.S.
- Died: December 10, 1979 (aged 102) Durham, North Carolina, U.S.
- Education: University of North Carolina
- Occupation: Librarian

Louis Round Wilson (December 27, 1876 – December 10, 1979) was an important figure to the field of library science, and is listed in "100 of the most important leaders we had in the 20th century," an article in the December 1999 issue of American Libraries. The article lists what he did for the field of library science including dean at the University of Chicago Graduate Library School, directing the library at the University of North Carolina Chapel Hill, and as one of the "internationally oriented library leaders in the U.S. who contributed much of the early history of the International Federation of Library Associations and Institutions." The Louis Round Wilson Library is named after him.

== Background ==
Louis Round Wilson was born on December 27, 1876, in Lenoir, North Carolina. Wilson was the youngest child of Jethro Reuben and Louisa Jane (Round) Wilson, who were both descendants from early English settlers. Growing up, Wilson frequented the local library in Lenoir, the Pioneer Library. His passion for the freedom to read led him to his important promotion of free public library services may have begun in his youth at the Pioneer Library.

Wilson later worked on a newspaper, called the Topic, and was also a janitor at the local Methodist church. He became the church's Sunday school librarian, spending about an hour charging and discharging books. With this experience he was introduced to printing, publishing, administration, and handling books, which would encompass his life's work.

Wilson attended Vine Hill Academy in Scotland Neck, North Carolina. He entered Davenport College, a preparatory school in 1894, studying Greek and ancient history among the other essential subjects. In 1895, Wilson entered Haverford College, but "left on account of ill-health" at the end of his Junior year, 1898. His Senior year, he decided to attend the University of North Carolina, the location of a milder climate which would be more beneficial to his health.

== University of North Carolina ==
Wilson received a letter from the dean of the University of North Carolina, asking if he would take the position of University Librarian, and was also provided the chance to continue his work on a master's degree. His Master's thesis was "The Influence of Lyly and Green upon the Pastoral Comedy of Shakespeare," and was published in the October 1902 issue of the University Magazine. During the beginning of his librarianship, he obtained copies of the Dewey abridged classification scheme, providing the rules and forms for cataloging, and widened his knowledge and expertise pertaining to the operation of libraries. Wilson also considered that the success of a librarian was dependent on both managerial skills and knowledge of books.

Wilson succeeded W.S. Bernard as the librarian at University of North Carolina. Wilson also worked with Katherine McCall, a graduate of the New York State Library School at Albany, during the summer of 1901 changing the classification system from a fixed location to the more modern "relative" Dewey arrangement that was being adopted by librarians across the nation. The library at the University of North Carolina owned 38,593 volumes of books at that time. That same year, Wilson obtained his first grant for the university to establish two reading prizes open to students for consecutive reading during their sophomore and junior years. This was also a plan that was used at Haverford. In addition to these works, Wilson prepared an exhibit of early North Caroliniana for display at the State Fair, which won a gold medal for the library.

== Wilson's first annual report ==
December 1901, Wilson prepared his first annual report for President Francis P. Venable, which was significant for his career as the new librarian as well as the fortunes of the university, and university libraries in general. Wilson stated that the "growth and support of the university library was a matter of primary significance if teaching and research were to have a sound foundation...recognizing that the excellence of the library was not solely the responsibility of the librarian." Wilson also urged the various academic departments to provide expertise in their fields by assisting the librarian in building the collections. The necessity of permanent assistants to help with the operations of the library was also stressed by Wilson, in addition to his emphasis on the careful treatment of rare items, and he was also concerned with building an extensive collection of North Carolina. In his report, Wilson came up with an important conclusion about the several short-term librarians that preceded his arrival as librarian at North Carolina. Wilson's statements in his report received the impressed attention of President Venable in which he wrote, "the salary of the Librarian should be increased so as to obtain the services of a skilled officer. Scarcely any instructor has the opportunity for more effective work among the students."

== Important benchmarks and awards ==
Wilson received his Ph.D. in philology with a dissertation on Chaucer's relative constructions in 1905 from the University of North Carolina as well. In 1905, he also joined the faculty as a German professor in 1905, and even began teaching courses in library science. Wilson helped found the North Carolina Library Association in 1904, and drafted the law establishing the North Carolina Library Commission in 1907. He co-founded the Southeastern Library Association and served as its president from 1924–1926, and also was president of the American Library Association in 1925. In 1951 he was awarded American Library Association Honorary Membership. In 1976 he was awarded the Melvil Dewey Medal.

During his career as the University librarian at UNC, Wilson increased the library's collection from 32,000 volumes in 1901 to 235,000 in 1932. In 1922 he founded the University of North Carolina Press, one of the most respected university publishing houses in the U.S., founded and edited Carolina's Alumni Review magazine, helped construct UNC's first student union, and organized a special department of the library with North Carolina Collection materials.

== University of Chicago Graduate Library School ==
Wilson left Chapel Hill and became dean of the University of Chicago Graduate Library School in 1932. Edward G. Holley, during the Louis Round Wilson Centennial Day, stated that Wilson made the decade following his leadership at the University of Chicago, a "golden age" for library education. The research and progress in the library science field under Wilson's leadership in Chicago has never been equaled. Wilson also later became a surveyor of libraries, helping several large libraries with impressive collections organize and catalog their materials to be more accessible. Students at the Graduate Library School, University of Chicago, 1928-1989. under Wilson went on to become head librarians at some of the most prestigious libraries in the United States.

== Late professional life ==
Wilson was a "Librarian, educator, writer, and editor...worked for thirty years as the developer of the library of a great state university, ten years as a dean who stirred a pioneering library school, and then eighteen years as a teacher of librarianship" In 1942, Wilson returned to Chapel Hill and worked at the University's libraries, until his retirement, while also doing a great deal of writing, including a history of the University of North Carolina, titled "The University of North Carolina: 1900-1930: The Making of a Modern University." Wilson died in 1979 at the age of 102.

== List of works ==
Wilson, L. R. (1935). County library service in the South; a study of the Rosenwald county library demonstration. Chicago: University of Chicago Press.
Wilson, L. R. (1966). Education and libraries; selected papers. In M. F. Tauber & J. Orne (Eds.), . Hamden, Connecticut: Shoe String Press.
Wilson, L. R. (1938). The geography of reading; a study of the distribution and status of libraries in the United States. Chicago: University of Chicago Press.
Wilson, L. R. (1951). The library in college instruction; a syllabus on the improvement of college instruction through library use. Westport, Connecticut: Greenwood Press.
Wilson, L. R. (1951). The library of the first State university. Chapel Hill: University of North Carolina Press.
Wilson, L. R. (1937). Library Trends. Chicago: University of Chicago Press.
Wilson, L. R. (1976). Louis Round Wilson's Historical sketches. Durham, NC: Moore Publishing Co.
Wilson, L. R. (1940). The Practice of Book Selection. Chicago: University of Chicago Press.
Wilson, L. R. (1957). The University of North Carolina, 1900-1930: The Making of a Modern University. Chapel Hill: University of North Carolina Press.
Wilson, L. R., & Tauber, M. F. (1945). The university library; its organization, administration and functions, by Louis Round Wilson and Maurice F. Tauber. Chicago: University of Chicago Press.

Non-profit organization positions
| Preceded by Charles H. Compton | President of the American Library Association; 1935–1936 | Succeeded by Malcolm Glenn Wyer |
