= Georgia Library Association =

Professional association for librarians in Georgia, United States

- Nickname: GLA
- Formation: May 31, 1897; 129 years ago
- Founder: Anne Wallace
- Founded at: Atlanta, Georgia
- Tax ID no.: 58-6043537
- Parent organization: American Library Association
- Website: gla.georgialibraries.org

The Georgia Library Association (GLA) is a professional organization in the United States for Georgia's librarians and library workers. It is headquartered in Savannah, Georgia. It was founded as The Georgia Library Club by members of the Young Men's Library of Atlanta and Georgia Federation of Women's Clubs. The organization changed its name to the Georgia Library Association at its first business meeting. GLAs first president was Anne Wallace, elected at the organization's first meeting May 31, 1897, in Atlanta, Georgia.

The Georgia Library Association was open only to White librarians until the Civil Rights Act of 1964. The American Library Association (ALA) asked each state chapter to recertify itself by 1956 and required that each state have a single, integrated chapter. The Georgia Library Association did not recertify and lost their chapter status. By 1965 the Georgia Library Association complied and was restored.

E. J. Josey was a Black Georgia librarian and ALA member. When he noted in 1964 that ALA officers attended the GLA conference, a conference he could not attend as an ALA member, he drafted a resolution forbidding ALA officers from participating in the activities of segregated ALA chapters. Josey became the first Black librarian to receive membership in GLA. He founded the Black Caucus of ALA in 1970 and was president of the American Library Association from 1984 through 1985.

GLA has published Georgia Library Quarterly (previously The Georgia Librarian) since 1964.

Records of the Georgia Library Association are archived at Valdosta State University.

== See also ==
- List of libraries in the United States
