= Ethel Martin Bolden =

American educator and librarian

- Born: December 14, 1918; Charleston, South Carolina, U.S.
- Died: October 20, 2002 (aged 83); Columbia, South Carolina, U.S.
- Occupations: Educator, librarian, community leader.
- Spouse(s): Charles F. Bolden, Sr. (m. 1941; died 1979)
- Children: former U.S. astronaut Major General Charles F. Bolden, Jr., and Warren M. Bolden, Sr

Ethel Evangeline Martin Bolden (December 14, 1918 – October 20, 2002) was an African-American librarian, educator, historian, and community leader.

Bolden educated generations of residents in Columbia, South Carolina. Bolden established libraries in Columbia's Black elementary schools and emphasized collecting books about Black history. She wrote, "It is now an established fact that the lack of a knowledge of the history of black Americans does harm not only to blacks but to whites as well. A lack of black history leaves the white student only half educated in American history, and only half prepared for the American future." Her dedication continued when she integrated Dreher High School as its head librarian in 1968.

== Early life and education ==
Ethel Evangeline Martin was born December 14, 1918, in Charleston, South Carolina to Ethel Sinkler and Thomas John Martin. Her father moved to Chicago, Illinois during the Great Migration in the early 1920s, but was severely injured in a streetcar accident. Her mother moved the rest of the family to Columbia, South Carolina, where she was hired as the superintendent of the Fairwold Industrial School for Delinquent Negro Girls, an organization founded in part by Celia Dial Saxon.

Martin spent time between her mother's house in Columbia and Peak, South Carolina, where her paternal grandmother ran a missionary school. Her mother died in 1927, followed by her grandmother in 1929. Martin and her younger brother then lived with various relatives.

Martin attended Booker T. Washington High School from 1932 to 1936. She also attended Barber–Scotia College, where she worked as a library assistant. She received her Bachelor of Science from Johnson C. Smith University.

Bolden completed her Master of Science degree in library science from Atlanta University in 1959, after writing her master's thesis on Susan Dart Butler.

== Career ==
She worked at Waverly Elementary school as an "intern teacher" for one year before she married Charles F. Bolden in 1941, and had to leave because married women could not be teachers.

In 1944, she became Waverly's first teacher-librarian, where she taught students part-time and established the first Black elementary school library in the city. She continued to supervise the establishment of libraries in most of the city's other Black elementary schools. She became the first librarian at W.A. Perry Middle School.

In 1968 she became the head librarian at Dreher High School. Her belief in free education for all students led her to open up the library's collection. She and guidance counselor Francena Robinson were the first two African Americans to integrate the faculty.

Bolden served on the staff of an institute held by Allen University, "Institute for Elementary Librarians" in 1969, where she gave a lecture titled "Evaluation, Selection and Acquisition of Materials for the Elementary School Library." She was a member of the Greater Columbia Community Relations Council, a multiracial taskforce founded by Mayor Lester Bates. She also served on the South Carolina Council on Human Relations and on the board of directors of its successor, the Greater Columbia Community Relations Council.

Bolden was an active member in professional organizations like the South Carolina Library Association and South Carolina Education Association. She was a dedicated researcher into Black experiences in South Carolina, and collected thousands of papers and other material, which she dedicated to local libraries. The Ethel Evangeline Martin Bolden papers collection at South Caroliniana Library at the University of South Carolina includes fifteen linear feet of manuscripts and material that provide insight into Bolden's life and work.

Bolden retired from Dreher in 1982, but continued to work in the local library community. She was the secretary of the Richland County Public Library board of trustees, and oversaw major projects such as construction of the Northeast branch, relocation of Eastover and Wheatley branches, and fundraising for the main branch.

== Honors and recognition ==
She was a lifetime member of the NAACP, and a lifetime member of Gamma Nu Omega chapter of Alpha Kappa Alpha sorority. She was awarded the Order of the Silver Crescent for Volunteer and Community Service, the Order of the Palmetto, and was inducted into the South Carolina Black Hall of Fame. She was recognized by organizations such as Christian Action Council and the board of directors of the Columbia Young Women's Christian Association as well as the Columbia City of Women project.

== Family and personal life ==
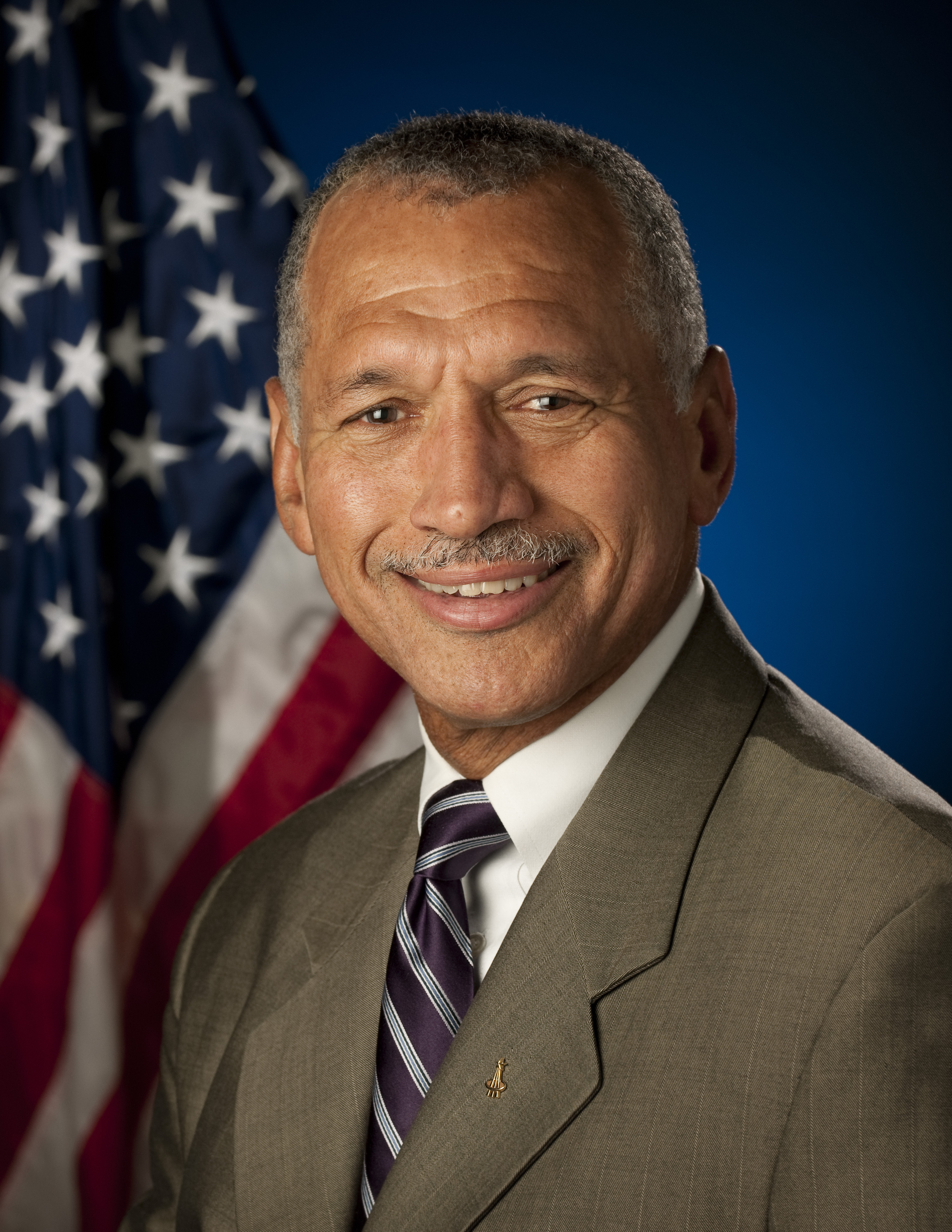
Major Charles F. Bolden, Jr.

Martin married Charles F. Bolden, Sr. (December 16, 1917 – October 18, 1979), in 1941. They remained married until his death in 1979.

They had two children, Charles F. Bolden, Jr., and Warren M. Bolden. Her older son, Major Charles F. Bolden, Jr. is a former administrator of NASA, a retired United States Marine Corps major general, and a former astronaut who flew on four Space Shuttle missions.

Bolden joined the Ladson Presbyterian Church, Columbia's oldest African-American church. Later, she was a founding member of Northminster Presbyterian Church.

== Death and legacy ==
Bolden died on October 20, 2002.

The Richland Library Friends and Foundation offers the Ethel Bolden Minority Fellowship award to encourage and provide financial support to students from underserved or underrepresented ethnic and racial groups.
