= Aerospace Industries Association =

American trade association

Aerospace Industries Association of America
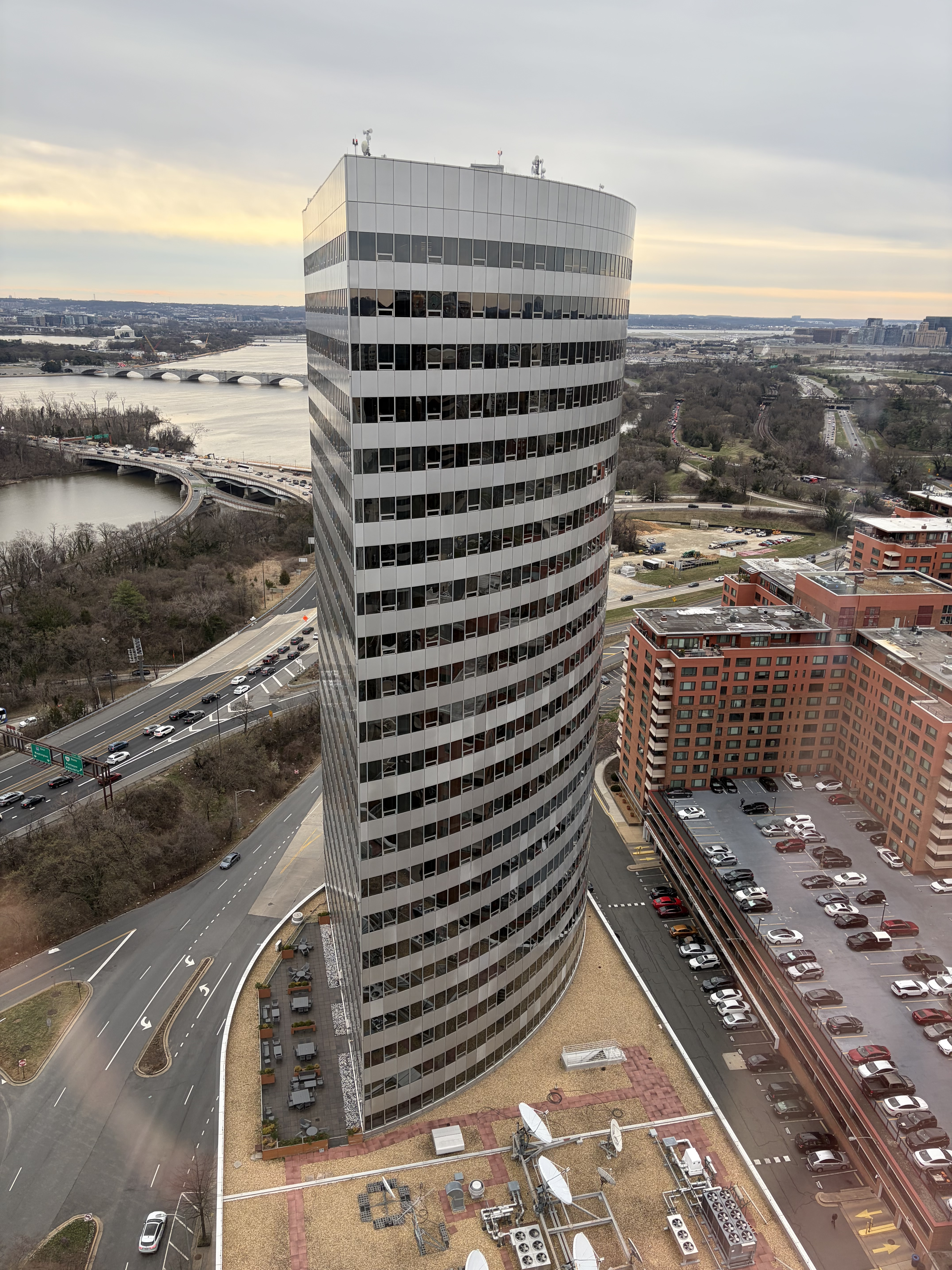
- The Aerospace Industries Association's headquarters at 1000 Wilson Boulevard in the Rosslyn Twin Towers
- Type: Non-profit trade association
- Industry: Aerospace Manufacturing; Defense
- Founded: 1919
- Headquarters: Arlington, Virginia, United States
- Area served: United States
- Key people: Eric Fanning (President & CEO); Robert Ortberg (Chairman)
- Number of employees: < 50
- Website: AIA-Aerospace.org

The Aerospace Industries Association (AIA) – originally the Aeronautical Chamber of Commerce (1922-1945), then Aircraft Industries Association (1945-1960) – is an American trade association representing manufacturers and suppliers of civil, military, and business aircraft, helicopters, UAVs, space systems, aircraft engines, missiles, material, and related components, equipment, services, and information technology in the United States. It also co-sponsors, with the National Association of Rocketry, the America Rocketry Challenge (TARC), an annual competition for high school students. Member companies also give awards and scholarships to top placing teams at the TARC national finals each year, and it is funded through sponsoring companies. AIA also develops the manufacturing standards called National Aerospace Standards, which are available to aerospace manufacturers that conform to United States Military Standards for equipment manufacturing and provide standards for other various components.

The organization's current president and CEO is Eric Fanning.

== Organization ==
The Aerospace Industries Association (AIA) is governed by a board of governors that meets twice a year and consists of senior representatives of member companies at the c-suite level, and an executive committee that meets more frequently. The government frequently seeks advice from AIA on issues, and AIA provides a forum for government and industry representatives to exchange views and resolve problems on non-competitive matters related to aerospace and defense.

== Advocacy ==
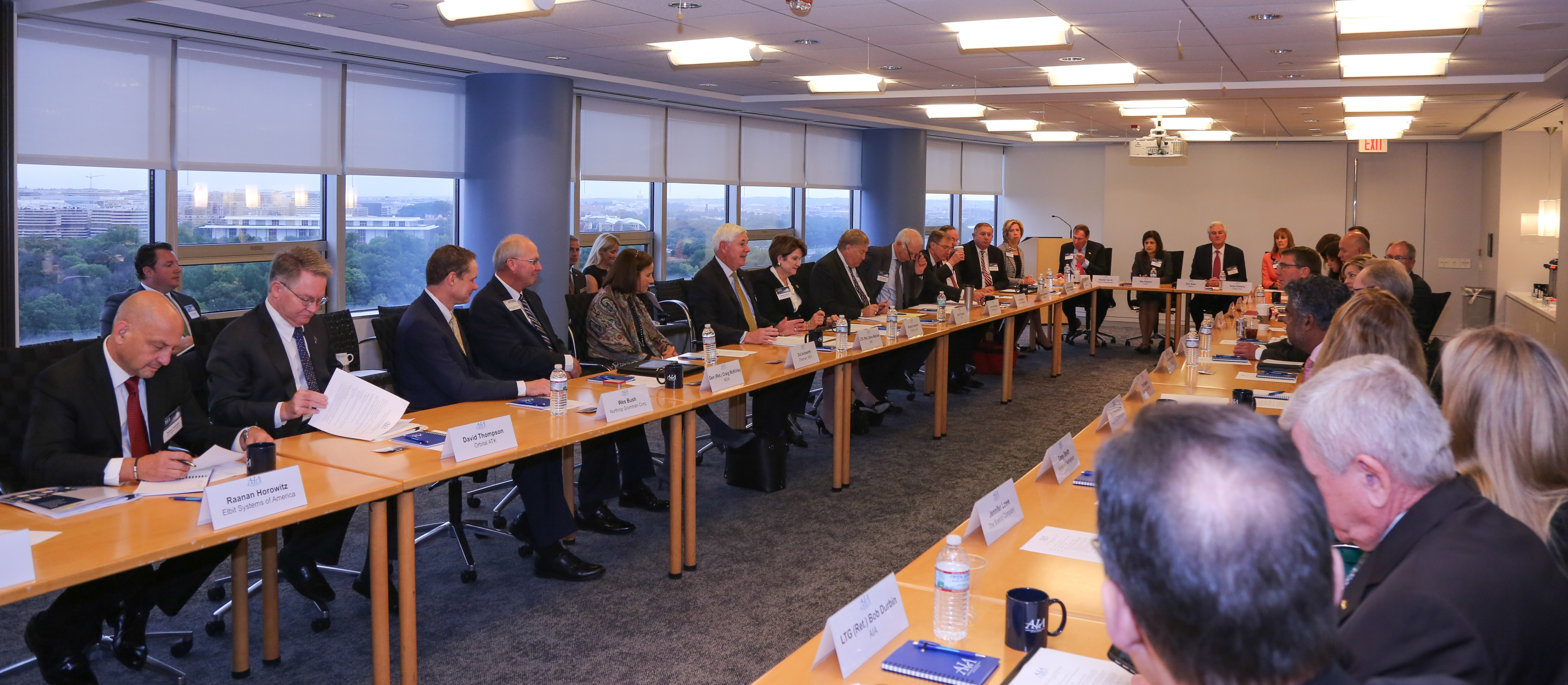
Defense Secretary Ash Carter meets with members of the Aerospace Industries Association at its Arlington, Virginia, headquarters in 2016.

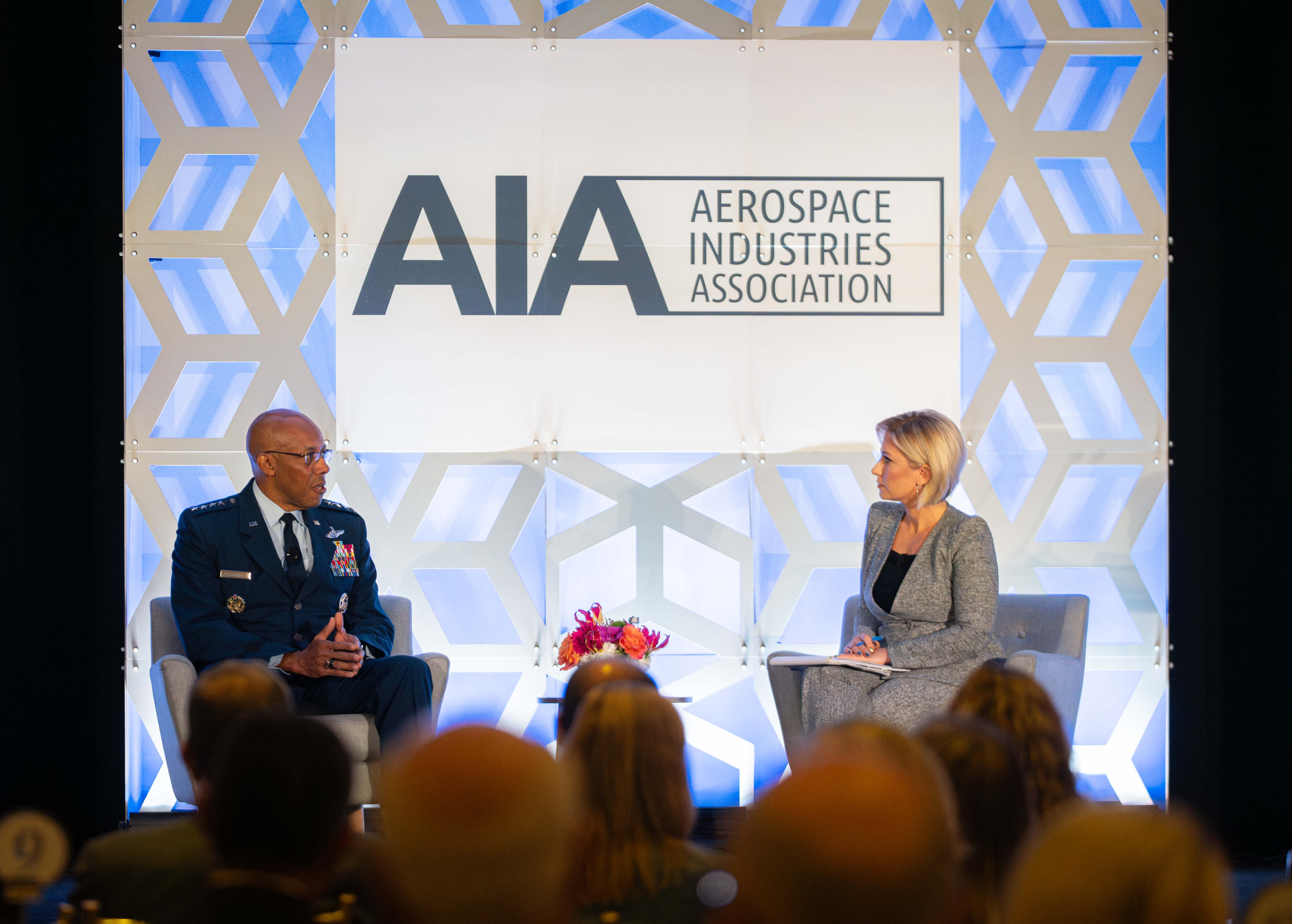
General Charles Q. Brown Jr. speaks with Morgan Brennan at the Aerospace Industries Association Board of Governors meeting at the Waldorf Astoria in Washington, D.C. on November 20, 2024

Founded in 1919 with the purpose of representing the American aviation industry, AIA has since expanded the scope of that vision with technological advance in aerospace. Today, on behalf of its more than 340 member companies, AIA advocates for aerospace and defense issues ranging from technical workforce policy to space exploration. Notable recurring topics of advocacy include "... robust federal budgets for aerospace and defense, a strong U.S. industrial base, defense modernization, and an efficient acquisition system."

Another AIA advocacy endeavor is National Aerospace Week, an event that celebrates aerospace in the United States. In 2010, National Aerospace Week was established under a resolution passed by both houses of the U.S. Congress, in conjunction with AIA. This event has been recognized by NASA and the U.S. Department of Commerce.

In late 2011, AIA launched the Second to None federal budget education campaign to inform the public and elected officials about the importance of the aerospace and defense industry and provide answers to what the predicted impacts of federal budget cuts, commonly known as sequestration, will have on the aerospace and defense industry. The campaign received significant media attention in 2012 for its efforts and competed as a finalist in 2012 for PRWeek Awards 2013's Public Affairs Campaign of the Year.

In July 2024, AIA signed a letter to members of both the House Committee on Armed Services and the Senate Committee on Armed Services opposing Section 828 of S. 4628, the National Defense Authorization Act for Fiscal Year 2025, entitled "Requirement for Contractors to Provide Reasonable Access to Repair Materials," which would require contractors doing business with the US military to agree "to provide the Department of Defense fair and reasonable access to all the repair materials, including parts, tools, and information, used by the manufacturer or provider or their authorized partners to diagnose, maintain, or repair the good or service."

== The America Rocketry Challenge ==
The America Rocketry Challenge (TARC) is an annual American model rocketry competition for students in grades seven to 12 sponsored by the Aerospace Industries Association and the National Association of Rocketry. Co-sponsors include NASA, United States Department of Defense, the American Association of Physics Teachers and the Civil Air Patrol. The event receives local and national media coverage and draws well-known representatives of the Defense Department, NASA, the FAA, and other government agencies. Past National Fly-Offs have been attended by United States Secretary of Defense Robert Gates, Apollo 11 astronaut Buzz Aldrin, Rocket Boys author Homer Hickam, former NASA Administrator Sean O'Keefe, U.S. Senator Mike Enzi, and former NASA Administrator, Charles Bolden.

== Membership ==
In October 2017, AIA's membership was composed of 346 member companies. This diverse group of businesses includes large aerospace and defense companies and small businesses alike. Membership is divided into full and associate membership.

The Aerospace Industries Association’s Supplier Management Council (SMC) has served as a forum for aerospace and defense manufacturers, prime contractors, and suppliers to discuss industry supply-chain issues. The council has organized meetings addressing supplier relationships, industry challenges, and policy matters affecting the aerospace and defense supply chain. Its activities have included industry networking, collaboration between suppliers and manufacturers, and discussion of regulatory and procurement issues.

== The Aircraft Year Book ==
The Aircraft Year Book (1919-1957), Aerospace-Facts-and-Figures (1959-1996), Annual-Report-Of-The-President (1952-1996), and other research documents have been uploaded and are online.

== History ==
The Smithsonian reports that the AIA was originally incorporated as the Aeronautical Chamber of Commerce (ACC) in 1922.

Other sources, however, report that:

"The Aeronautical Chamber of Commerce was incorporated under the laws of the State of New York in 1919 and was formally organized with 100 charter members on December 31, 1921."

At the end of World War II, in 1945, it became the Aviation Industries Association (AIA). In 1960, during the early years of the Space Race, was renamed the Aerospace Industries Association (AIA)

== Historical leadership ==
=== Previous chairman ===
AIA Chairman are selected from the leadership of member companies, as voted by the Board of Governors. Each Chairman serves a yearlong term, begin on 1 January and ending on 31 December.

AIA Chairman Since 2005
Year	Chairman	Company
2019	William Brown	L3 Harris Technologies
2018	Tom Kennedy	Raytheon
2017	Dennis Muilenburg	The Boeing Company
2016	Marillyn Hewson	Lockheed Martin
2015	David L. Joyce	General Electric Aviation
2014	Michael T. Strianese	L3 Technologies
2013	Wes Bush	Northrop Grumman Corporation
2012	David P. Hess	Pratt & Whitney
2011	James F. Albaugh	The Boeing Company
2010	Scott C. Donnelly	Textron Inc.
2009	Bob Stevens	Lockheed Martin Corporation
2008	Clay Jones	Rockwell Collins
2007	Bill Swanson	Raytheon Company
2006	Ronald D. Sugar	Northrop Grumman Corporation
2005	Robert D. Johnson	Honeywell Aerospace

== See also ==
- The America Rocketry Challenge
- National Aerospace Week
