= Fannie Phelps Adams =

American educator, activist (1917–2016)

- Born: Fannie Delores Phelps; June 17, 1917; Columbia, South Carolina, U.S.
- Died: May 30, 2016 (aged 98); U.S.
- Occupations: Educator, activist
- Spouse: David King Adams Jr.
- Children: 1

Fannie Phelps Adams (née Fannie Delores Phelps; June 17, 1917 – May 30, 2016) was an American educator and activist from South Carolina. She was known for her commitment to helping encourage the minds of Black youth during Jim Crow. She is among the '101 Women Who Shaped South Carolina'.

== Early life and education ==
Fannie Phelps Adams was born as Fannie Delores Phelps on June 27, 1917, in Wheeler Hill, Columbia, South Carolina, to African American parents Mary Lou and James Phelps. She was the eighth of their ten children, and her father died when she was a young child.

In 1934, she graduated from Booker T. Washington High School in Columbia, South Carolina, which was the only high school for African Americans in the city. She earned her Bachelor's of Arts degree in 1938 from Allen University in Columbia, South Carolina and her master's in 1953 from South Carolina State University in Orangeburg, South Carolina.

She was married to David King Adams Jr., and they had one daughter together.

== Career ==
Adams began her career as a third grade teacher at Booker T. Washington Heights Elementary School. She continued to work there until 1943, moving to Booker T. Washington High School where she taught English and social studies. After years of teaching, she transitioned into administrative roles, working as a guidance counselor, assistant principal, and acting principal at the same school. After it closed in 1976, she worked until retirement, five years later, as the assistant principal on A.C. Flora High School.

=== Activism ===
Adams activism was rooted in her work in preparing her students to overcome the racial challenges and discrimination they may face throughout their lives. She encouraged confidence, positive attitude, and taught her kids the skills needed to create progress in an unjust society, while emphasizing the importance of collaboration and responsibility. The University South Carolina's Museum of Education "invited Fannie Phelps Adams, a colleague of Septima Clark, to speak at the October 2008 So Their Voices Will Never be Forgotten session. While students and faculty had been reading the words of Septima Clark during the past year, we could now hear the voice of a 92 year old African American talk of life as an educator in a segregated setting where, while teaching only blocks away, she would not have been allowed to enter the Museums space and outdoor pavilion. Unknown to Mrs. Phelps Adams, the event concluded with the unveiling of a commemorative bench on the Museums pavilion area with the inscription, in honor of Fannie Phelps Adams and the courageous teachers of Booker T. Washington High School who fought for civil rights so that all individuals could sit on this bench. During the 2008-2009 academic year, the Museum will begin each So Their Voices Will Never be Forgotten event with an audio recording by Phelps Adams . . . so that her voice will never be forgotten, and every program will conclude with a reading at the Phelps Adams bench".

=== Community work ===
Adams was a lifelong member of the St. James AME Church and lived in Wheeler Hill, Columbia, SC, her entire life. She was one of the founders of the Palmetto Cemetery Association and held the office of a director of the Wheeler Hill Neighborhood Association. Adams was a member of the NAACP, the University of South Carolina's Community Advisory Committee, and was a sister of the Zeta Phi Beta, a historically black sorority.

== Achievements and honors ==
For her involvement and work to improve her communities, Adams was awarded many honors in her lifetime. From the Richland County Education Association, the South Carolina Education Association, and the National Education Association, she received the Human Relations Award.

In 1996, she was inducted into the South Carolina Black Hall of Fame. In 2008, she was inducted into the Richland One Hall of Fame. That same year, a commemorative bench was unveiled in her honor at the University of South Carolina Education Museum. She was inducted into the Bell South's South Carolina American History Calendar, in 2010.

Adams died on May 30, 2016. In June of the same year, a South Carolina House Resolution was passed to express deep sorrow of her death and to give condolences to her loved ones.
