= National Aerospace Standard =

U.S. aviation industry standards

National Aerospace Standards (NAS) are U.S. industry standards for the aerospace industry. They are created and maintained by the Aerospace Industries Association (AIA). The Federal Aviation Administration recognizes National Aerospace Standards as "traditional standards" for the purposes of parts approval.

The primary AIA committee responsible for developing standards is the National Aerospace Standards Committee (NASC). Since 1938, NASC has developed more than 2,600 standards for aerospace fasteners and other mechanical parts. Personnel from the defense services, Defense Industrial Supply Center and Defense Electronics Supply Center participate in the preparation of NAS standards, and liaison is maintained with the FAA, NASA, AIA Canada, and the airlines. NAS standards are developed on the basis of user requirements, although coordination is accomplished with suppliers and other materially affected interests.
