= Booker T. Washington High School (Columbia, South Carolina) =

- Booker T. Washington High School Auditorium
- U.S. National Register of Historic Places
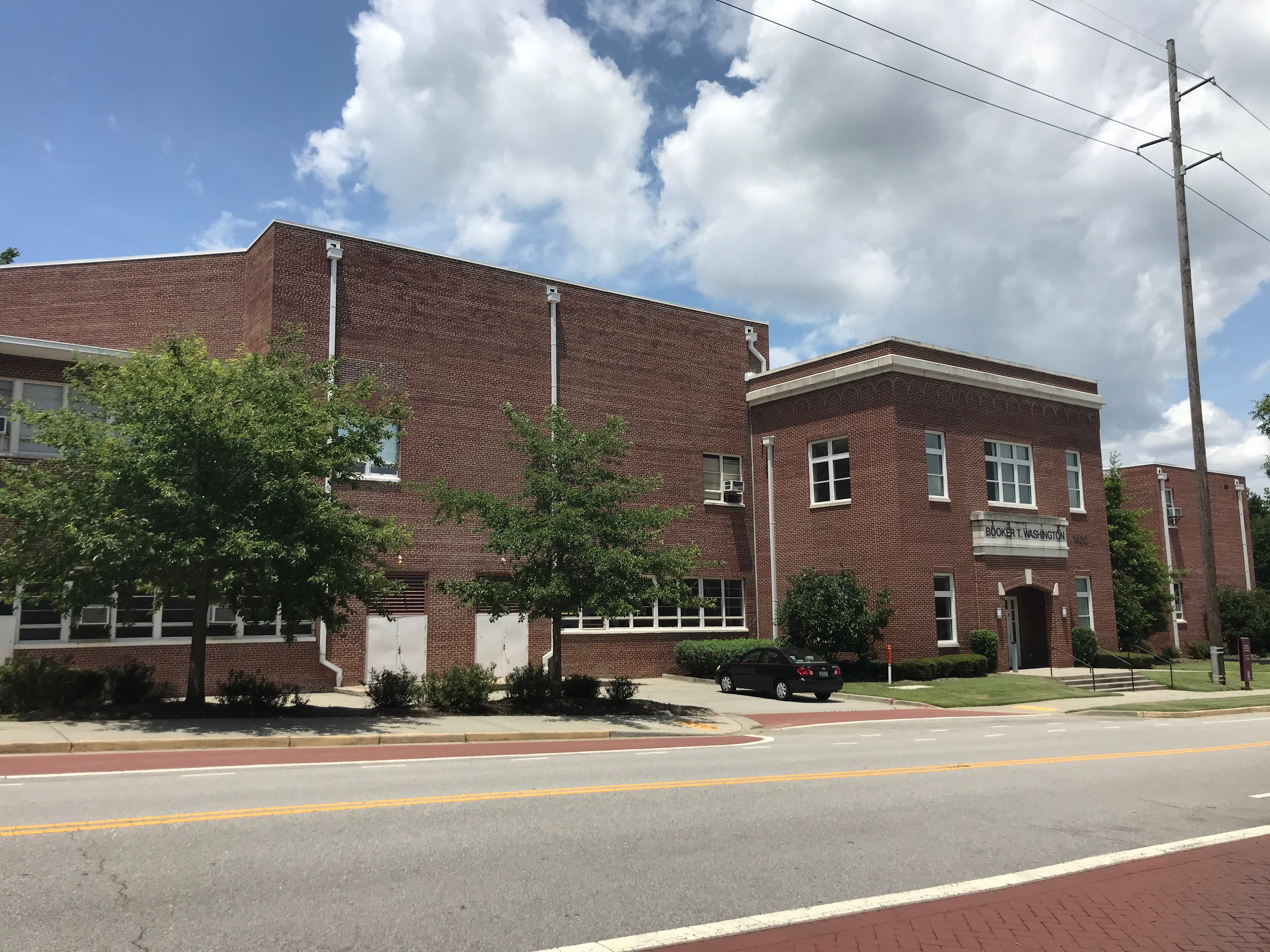
- Booker T. Washington High School Auditorium building (2020)

- Location within South Carolina
- Location: 1400 Wheat Street, Columbia, South Carolina, U.S.
- Coordinates: 33°59′35″N 81°01′31″W
- Area: 1.05 acres (0.42 ha)
- Architect: James Burwell Urquhart; C. Heslep Company
- Architectural style: International Style
- MPS: Segregation in Columbia, South Carolina MPS
- NRHP reference No.: 100003059
- Added to NRHP: October 24, 2018

Booker T. Washington High School was a segregated high school for African American students founded in 1916 in Columbia, South Carolina. It closed in 1974. The former school's auditorium is listed on the National Register of Historic Places since 2018.

== History ==
The Booker T. Washington High School was founded in 1916, was the second segregated school for African American students.

The Booker T. Washington High School Auditorium building is two-story brick building constructed in 1956 in the International Style. The auditorium building housed an auditorium as well as classrooms for the vocational and performing arts.

The other Booker T. Washington High School buildings were removed in 1974, when the campus was purchased by the University of South Carolina.

== Legacy ==
The University of South Carolina's 'Museum of Education' hosts a web exhibition on the high school and its participation in a 1940 Association of Colleges and Secondary Schools for Negroes’ Secondary School Study.

Educational historian Anthony L. Edwards has written about the school and its history and conducted interviews as part of his research. The Booker T. Washington High School Foundation was established to preserve and celebrate the school's heritage and legacy.

== Alumni ==
- Fannie Phelps Adams (1917–2016)
- Ethel Martin Bolden (1918–2002)

== See also ==
- List of things named after Booker T. Washington
