= Wesley G. Bush =

American corporate executive

- Education: Massachusetts Institute of Technology
- Occupations: Systems engineer, business executive
- Employer(s): General Motors, Cisco, Northrop Grumman
- Title: Director, Chairman
- Spouse: Natalie Bush
- Children: 3

Wesley G. Bush is an American systems engineer and business executive. He is the former CEO and chairman of Northrop Grumman, and he is currently a director of General Motors, Dow Inc., GE Aerospace, and Cisco.

== Early life and education ==
Bush was raised in Morgantown, West Virginia. He has both Bachelor of Science and Master of Science degrees in electrical engineering from the Massachusetts Institute of Technology.

== Career ==
Bush started work as a systems engineer at TRW Inc. in Redondo Beach, California, in 1987. By the early 2000s, he was president and chief executive of its "British-based aeronautical systems." Northrop bought the company in 2002, and took over his contract.

He was chief operating officer of Northrop Grumman from 2003 to 2006, and chief financial officer from 2005 to 2007. He was appointed its president in May 2006, and in January 2010, became chief executive officer. In the same year he moved its headquarters from Los Angeles, California to Falls Church, Virginia, to be closer to The Pentagon and to be more competitive with other companies in the sector. In June 2011, he was appointed chairman. He earned US$10.4 million in 2009, US$22.9 million in 2011, and US$11.70 million in 2012. He resigned as chief executive in July 2018, and as chairman with effect from July 2019. On June 27, two weeks prior to his resignation, a scathing independent review outlined the 14-year delay, 19x budget overrun, and numerous human errors made by Northrop Grumman in the construction of the James Webb Space Telescope, which led to Wes testifying before congress on July 26.

Bush is on the executive committee of the board of governors of the Aerospace Industries Association, and – since 2012 – on the board of directors of the Norfolk Southern Corporation. He is a director of Conservation International, a trustee of the United States Naval Academy Foundation, and a former trustee of the Smithsonian National Air and Space Museum.

He was inducted into the West Virginia Business Hall of Fame in 2003.

Bush was elected a member of the National Academy of Engineering in 2015 for engineering leadership in national security.

== Personal life ==
He is married to Natalie Bush, a nurse. They have three children. With his wife, he endowed a nursing scholarship at West Virginia University.
