= National Aerospace Week =

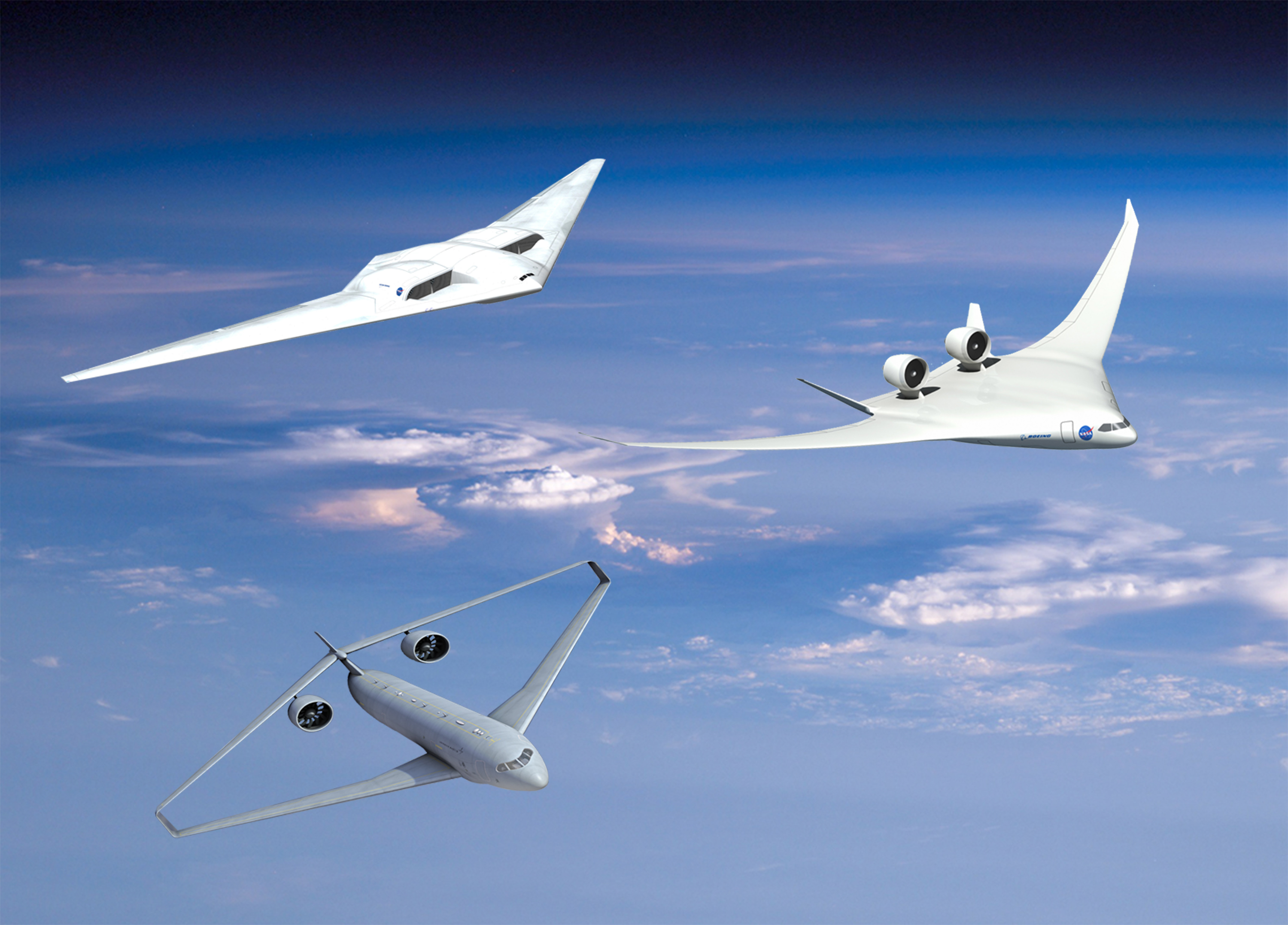
NASA has tried to make aircraft quieter, more fuel efficient, and less polluting.

Aerospace Week is an event which celebrates aerospace in the United States. It was established in 2010, and has been celebrated by various government and private organizations, including NASA and the U.S. Department of Commerce. National Aerospace Week was established by an agreement between the U.S. Congress in conjunction with the Aerospace Industries Association . In late 2010 a resolution supporting National Aerospace Week passed both houses of U.S. congress.

In 2012 NAW was held from September 16–22, 2012.

In 2013 the NASA Administrator Charlie Bolden noted the National Aerospace Week.

In 2014, the National Aerospace Week was held Sept. 14-20, 2014. During that week the Governor of the U.S. State of Utah honored the aerospace industry at a luncheon. In 2014 the United States secretary of commerce issued a statement for National Aerospace Week.

In celebration of National Aerospace Week’s fifth anniversary, I would like to applaud the U.S. aerospace community on its contributions to our country’s national security and economic prosperity. The American aerospace and defense industry helps form the backbone of our nation’s technological edge. They deserve our recognition for making the industry the world’s leader in aerospace innovation and helping to protect American service members in every part of the globe.

— U.S. Secretary of Commerce, 2014

Aerospace Week was once again recognized by the U.S Department of Commerce in 2017 through a letter from Secretary of Commerce Wilbur Ross.

In addition to aerospace week, NASA also celebrates National Aviation Day, which was established in the 1939.

== See also ==
- Paris Air Show
- National Aviation Day
