= South Carolina Library Association =

Professional association for librarians in South Carolina

- Nickname: SCLA
- Formation: October 27, 1915; 110 years ago
- Tax ID no.: 23-7078610
- Headquarters: Columbia, South Carolina
- Parent organization: American Library Association
- Website: www.scla.org

The South Carolina Library Association (SCLA) is a professional organization for South Carolina's librarians and library workers. It is headquartered in Columbia, South Carolina. It was founded on October 27, 1915, in Columbia. University of South Carolina librarian Robert M. Kennedy was the association's first president from 1915 through 1921. The group became a chapter of the American Library Association in 1944.

SCLA admitted its first black members in 1962 after an ALA inquiry requesting that Southern library associations "clarify their positions on black membership." SCLA president Nancy Jane Day certified that membership was open to black members, many of whom had been attending the meetings of the library section of the Palmetto Education Association.

SCLA published the South Carolina Library Bulletin from 1945 through 1956, followed by the South Carolina Librarian from 1956 to 1988. South Carolina Libraries is currently the official open access journal of SCLA.

== See also ==
- List of libraries in the United States
