= Ladson Presbyterian Church =

Historic church in South Carolina, United States

- U.S. National Register of Historic Places
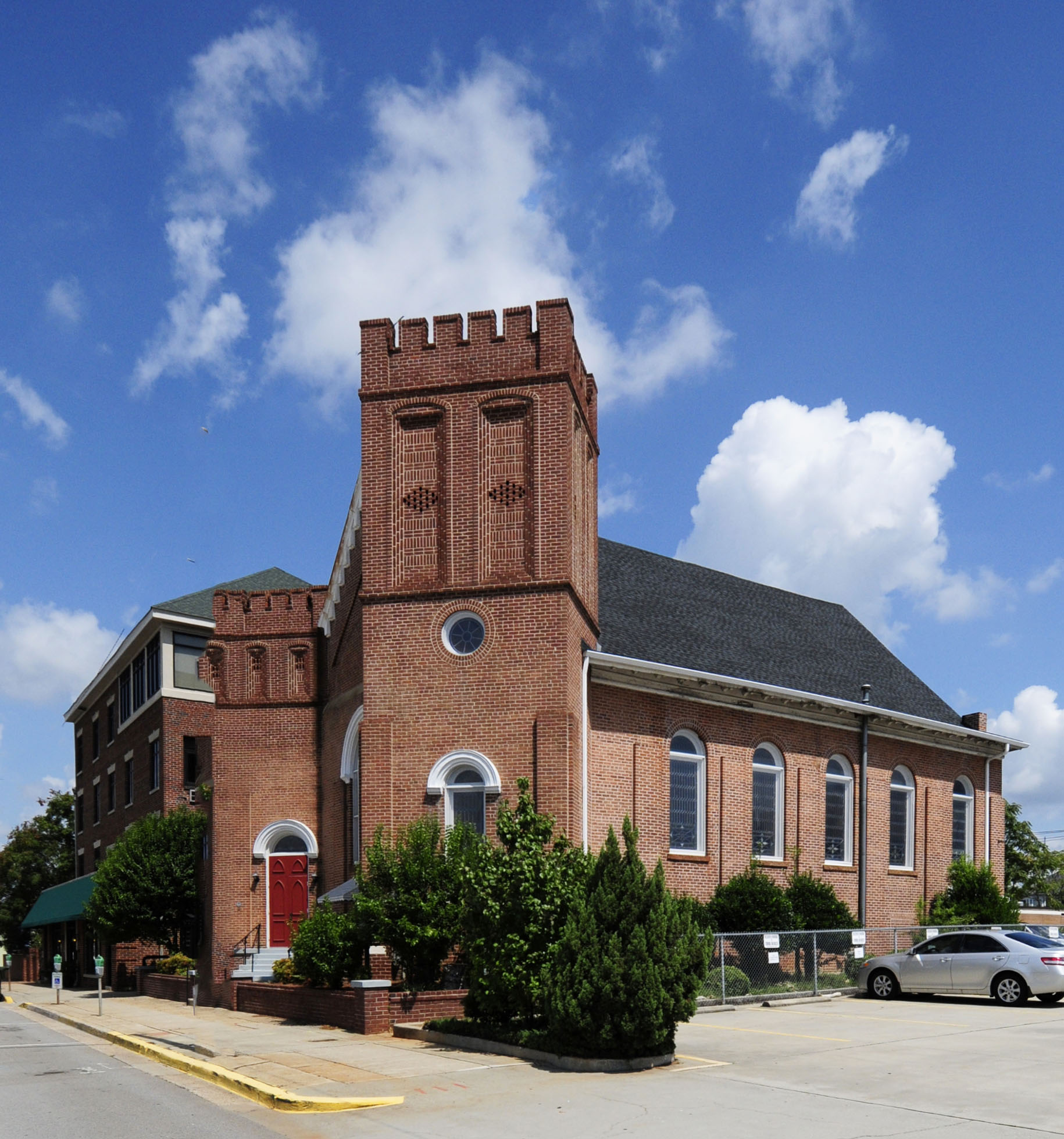

- Location within South Carolina Location within the United States
- Location: 1720 Sumter St., Columbia, South Carolina
- Coordinates: 34°0′33″N 81°2′7″W
- Area: less than one acre
- Built: 1838 (a chapel), 1896 (rebuilt)
- Architect: Ziegler, Daniel G. & Co.; Heidt, H.G.
- Architectural style: Renaissance
- NRHP reference No.: 98000419
- Added to NRHP: April 30, 1998

Ladson Presbyterian Church is a historic African American Presbyterian church located at 1720 Sumter Street in Columbia, South Carolina. The religious building was initially a chapel founded in 1838 and, rebuilt in 1896, and is a one-story-over-raised-basement, rectangular red brick building in the Renaissance Revival style. It has a front gable roof and features two brick entrance towers. The congregation was founded in 1838, as an offshoot congregation of the First Presbyterian Church.

It was added to the National Register of Historic Places in 1998.
