= Charles Bolden =

American astronaut and 12th NASA Administrator (born 1946)

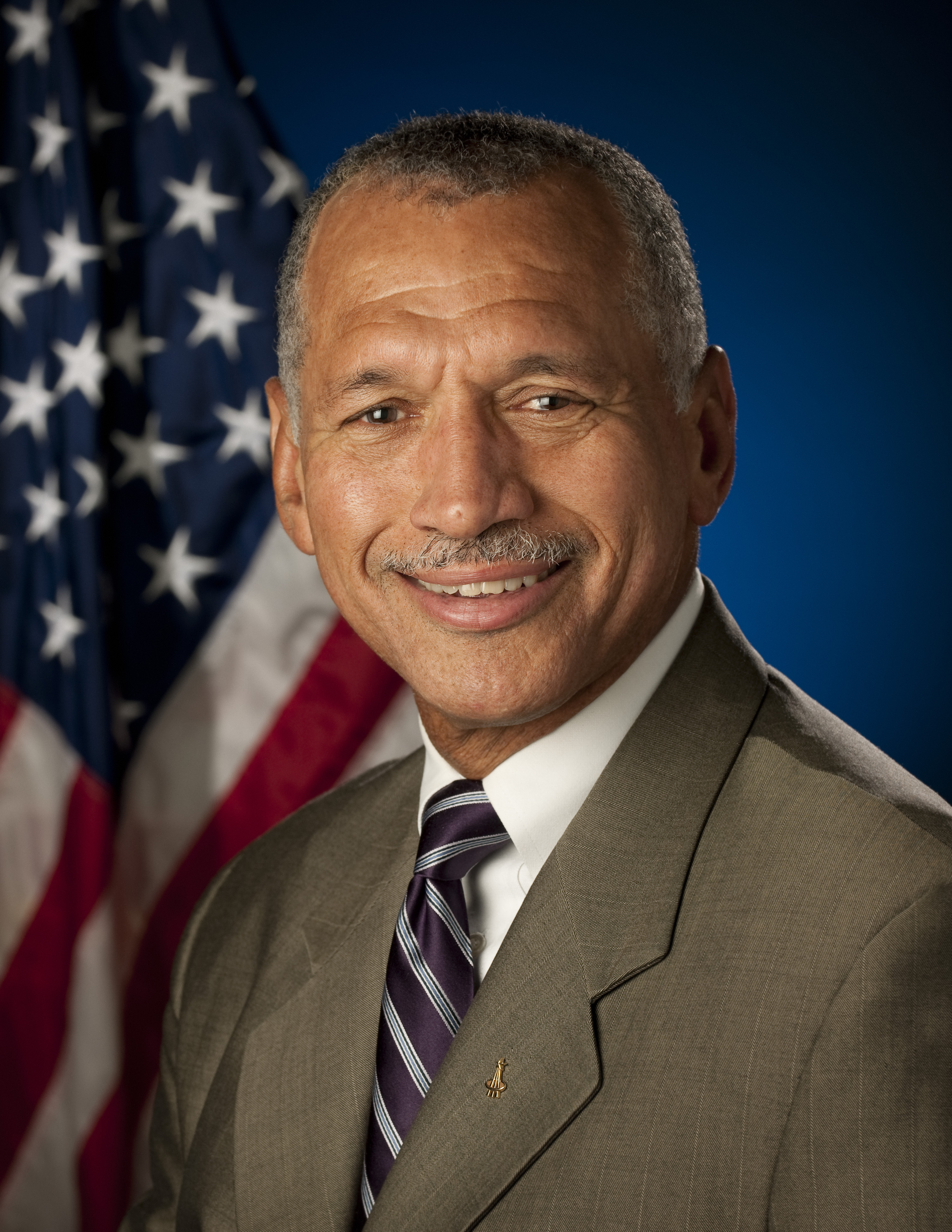
- Official portrait, 2009

12th Administrator of the National Aeronautics and Space Administration
- In office July 17, 2009 – January 20, 2017
- President: Barack Obama
- Deputy: Lori Garver; Dava Newman
- Preceded by: Michael D. Griffin
- Succeeded by: Jim Bridenstine

Personal details
- Born: Charles Frank Bolden Jr. August 19, 1946 (age 80) Columbia, South Carolina, U.S.
- Spouse: Alexis Walker
- Children: 2
- Relatives: Ethel Martin Bolden (mother)
- Education: United States Naval Academy (BS); University of Southern California (MS)
- Civilian awards: National Space Trophy; Nierenberg Prize; Carl Sagan Award for Public Appreciation of Science

Military service
- Allegiance: United States
- Branch/service: United States Marine Corps
- Years of service: 1968–2004
- Rank: Major General
- Commands: I Marine Expeditionary Force; 3rd Marine Aircraft Wing
- Battles/wars: Vietnam War (1972–73); Desert Thunder (1998)
- Military awards: Distinguished Service Medal; Superior Service Medal; Legion of Merit (2)
- Awards: NASA Outstanding Leadership Medal; NASA Exceptional Service Medal; NASA Space Flight Medal
- Space career

NASA astronaut
- Time in space: 28 days, 8 hours, 37 minutes
- Selection: NASA Group 9 (1980)
- Missions: STS-61-C (1986); STS-31 (1990); STS-45 (1992); STS-60 (1994)
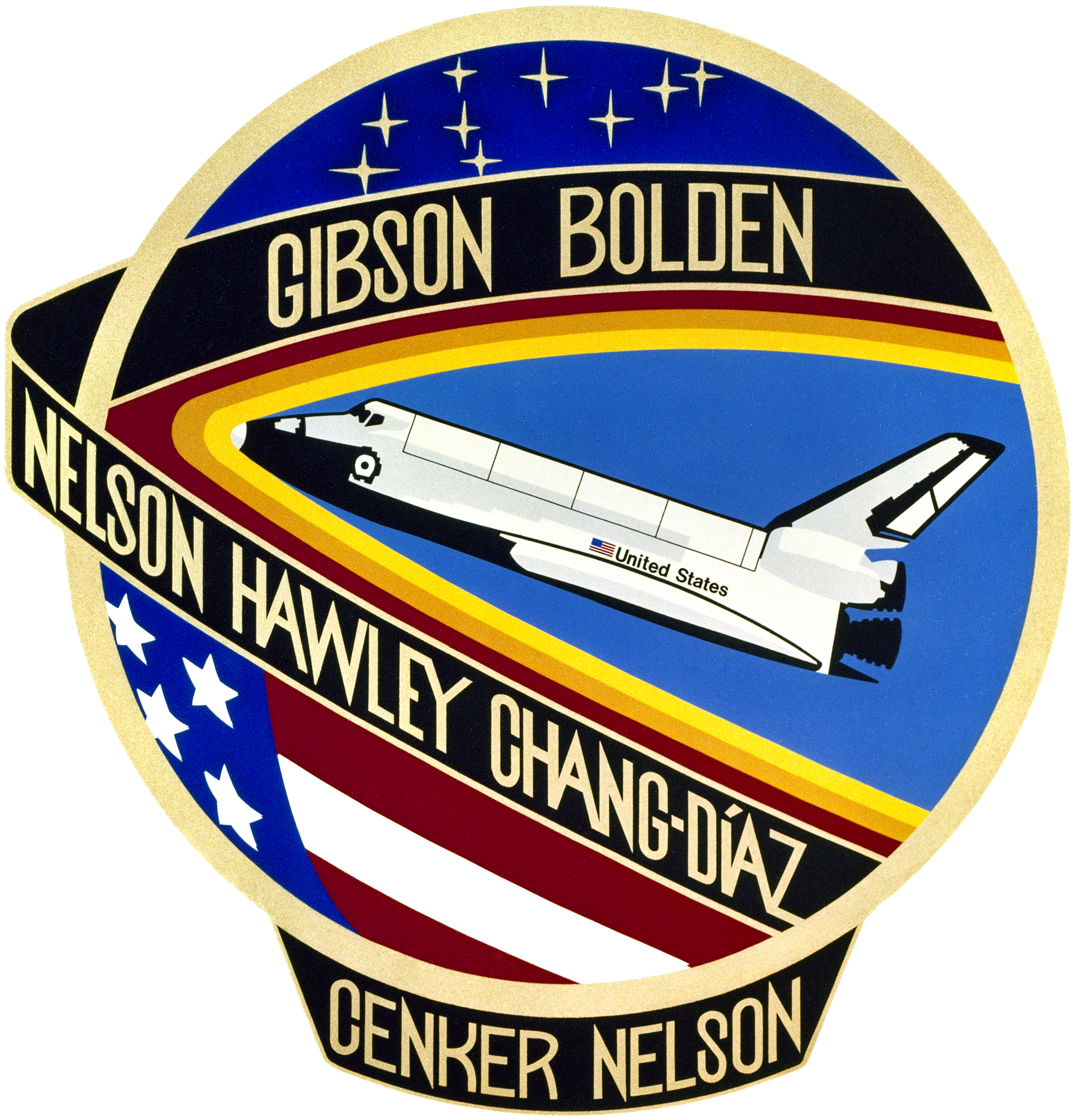
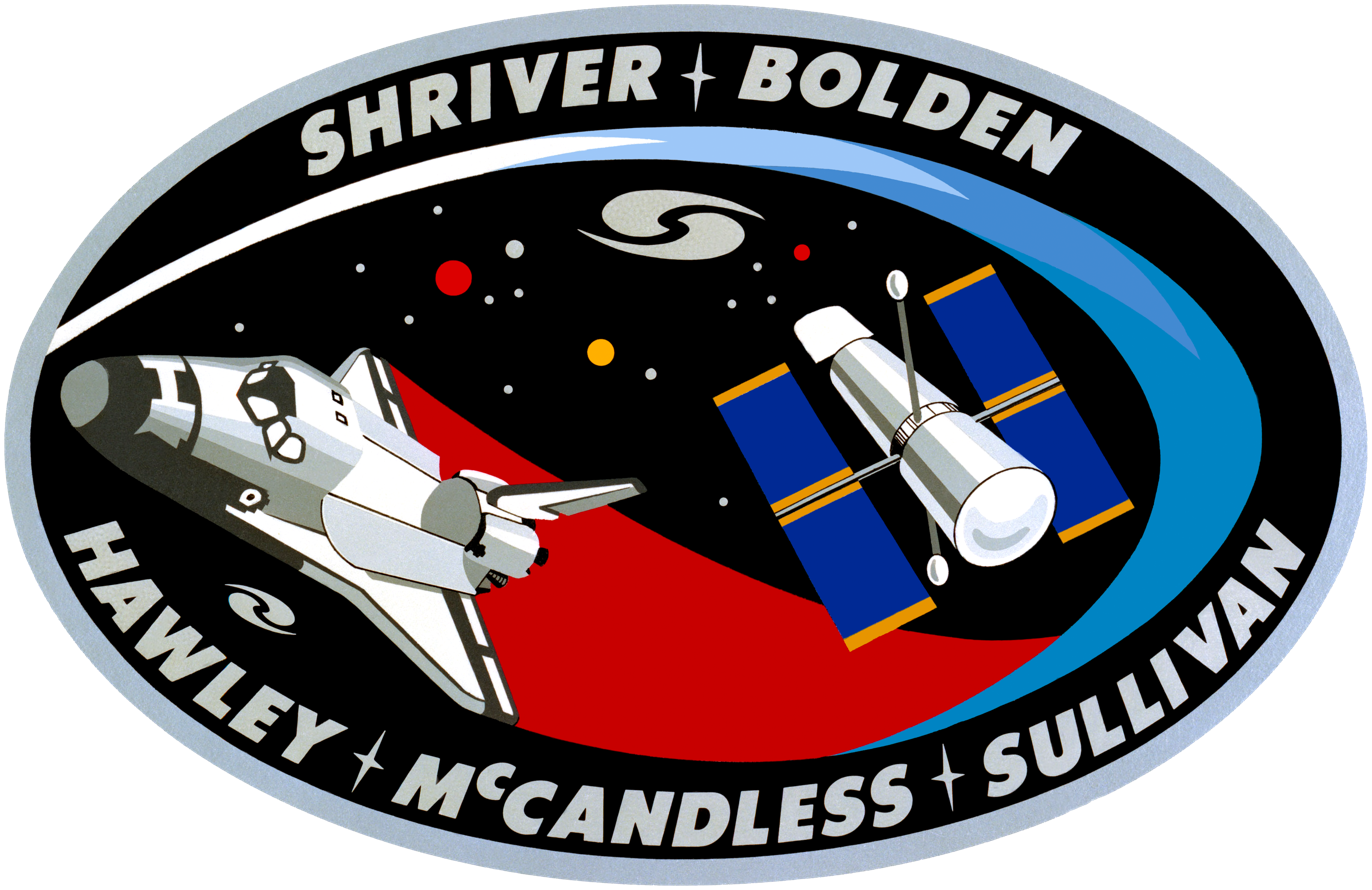
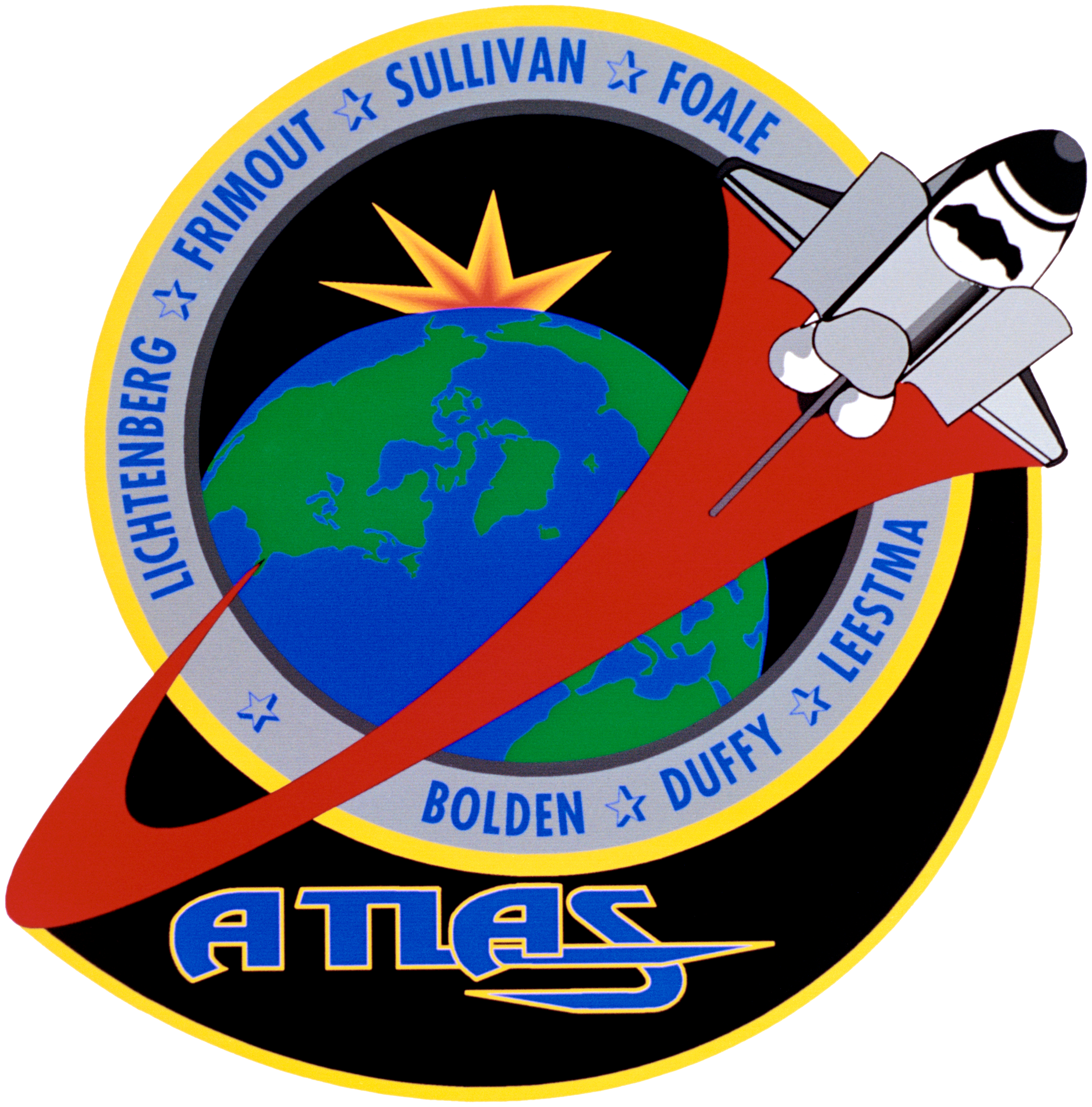
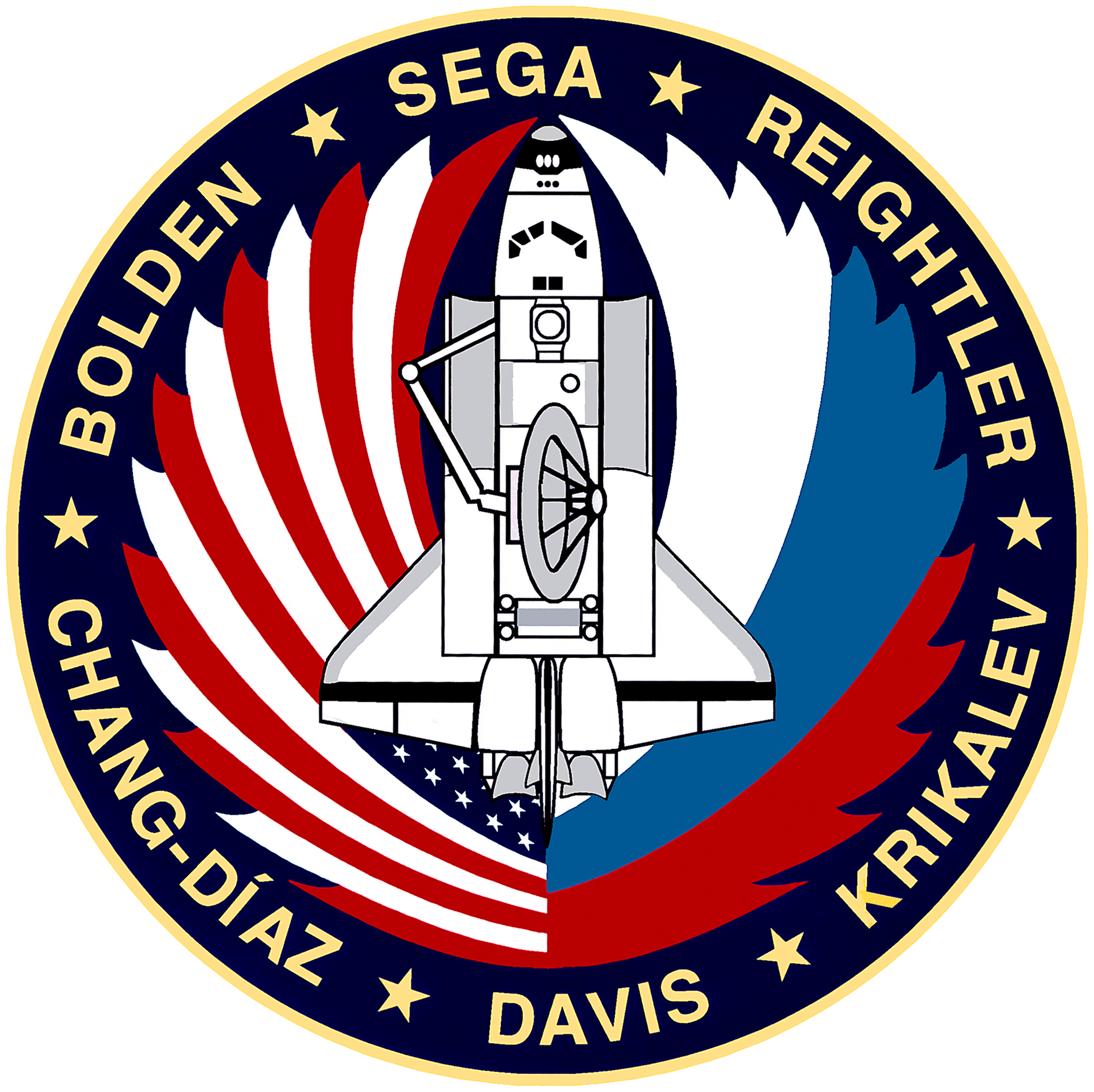
- Mission insignia

Charles Frank Bolden Jr. (born August 19, 1946) is a former administrator of NASA, a retired United States Marine Corps Major General, and a former astronaut who flew on four Space Shuttle missions.

He graduated from the United States Naval Academy with the class of 1968. Bolden became a Marine aviator and test pilot. After his service as an astronaut, he became Deputy Commandant of Midshipmen at the Naval Academy.

On May 23, 2009, President Barack Obama announced the nomination of Bolden as Administrator of NASA and Lori Garver as deputy NASA administrator. Both were confirmed by the Senate by unanimous consent on July 15, 2009. Bolden was the first African American to head the agency on a permanent basis.

On January 12, 2017, Bolden announced his retirement from NASA during a town hall meeting at NASA Headquarters in Washington D.C. His last day would be January 19, and Robert M. Lightfoot Jr. was announced as acting NASA administrator.

In 2020, Bolden was elected a member of the National Academy of Engineering for leadership and development of U.S. human spaceflight and space operations programs, and for revitalizing fundamental aeronautics research.

== Education ==
Bolden graduated from C. A. Johnson High School in Columbia, South Carolina, in 1964. He earned a Bachelor of Science degree in electrical science from the United States Naval Academy in 1968, where he was a contemporary of future Marine officers Oliver North, Jim Webb and Michael Hagee and future Chairman of the Joint Chiefs of Staff Michael Mullen, and Admirals Dennis C. Blair, and Jay L. Johnson. He later earned a Master of Science degree in systems management from the University of Southern California in 1977. He is a member of Omega Psi Phi fraternity.

== Military career ==
In high school Bolden was turned down for an appointment to the United States Naval Academy by South Carolina's Congressional delegation, which included then segregationist Senator Strom Thurmond. Bolden received his appointment after personally writing, as a high school senior, to President Lyndon B. Johnson. A recruiter came to his house a few weeks later, eventually leading to Bolden receiving an appointment from U.S. Representative William L. Dawson from Chicago, Illinois. He later received notes of congratulations from Thurmond at various career milestones.

Bolden was commissioned a second lieutenant in the United States Marine Corps (USMC) following graduation from the United States Naval Academy in 1968. He was president of his class. He underwent flight training at Pensacola, Florida; Meridian, Mississippi; and Kingsville, Texas, before being designated a United States Naval Aviator in May 1970.

He flew more than 100 sorties into North and South Vietnam, Laos, and Cambodia in the A-6A Intruder while assigned to VMA(AW)-533 at Royal Thai Air Base Nam Phong, Thailand, from June 1972 to June 1973. Upon returning to the United States, Bolden began a two-year tour as a Marine Corps officer selection and recruiting officer in Los Angeles, California, followed by three years in various assignments at Marine Corps Air Station El Toro, California.

In June 1979, he graduated from the United States Naval Test Pilot School at Naval Air Station Patuxent River, Maryland, and was assigned to the Naval Air Test Center's Systems Engineering and Strike Aircraft Test Directorates. While there, he served as an ordnance test pilot and flew numerous test projects in the A-6E, EA-6B, and A-7C/E airplanes. He logged more than 6,000 hours flying time.

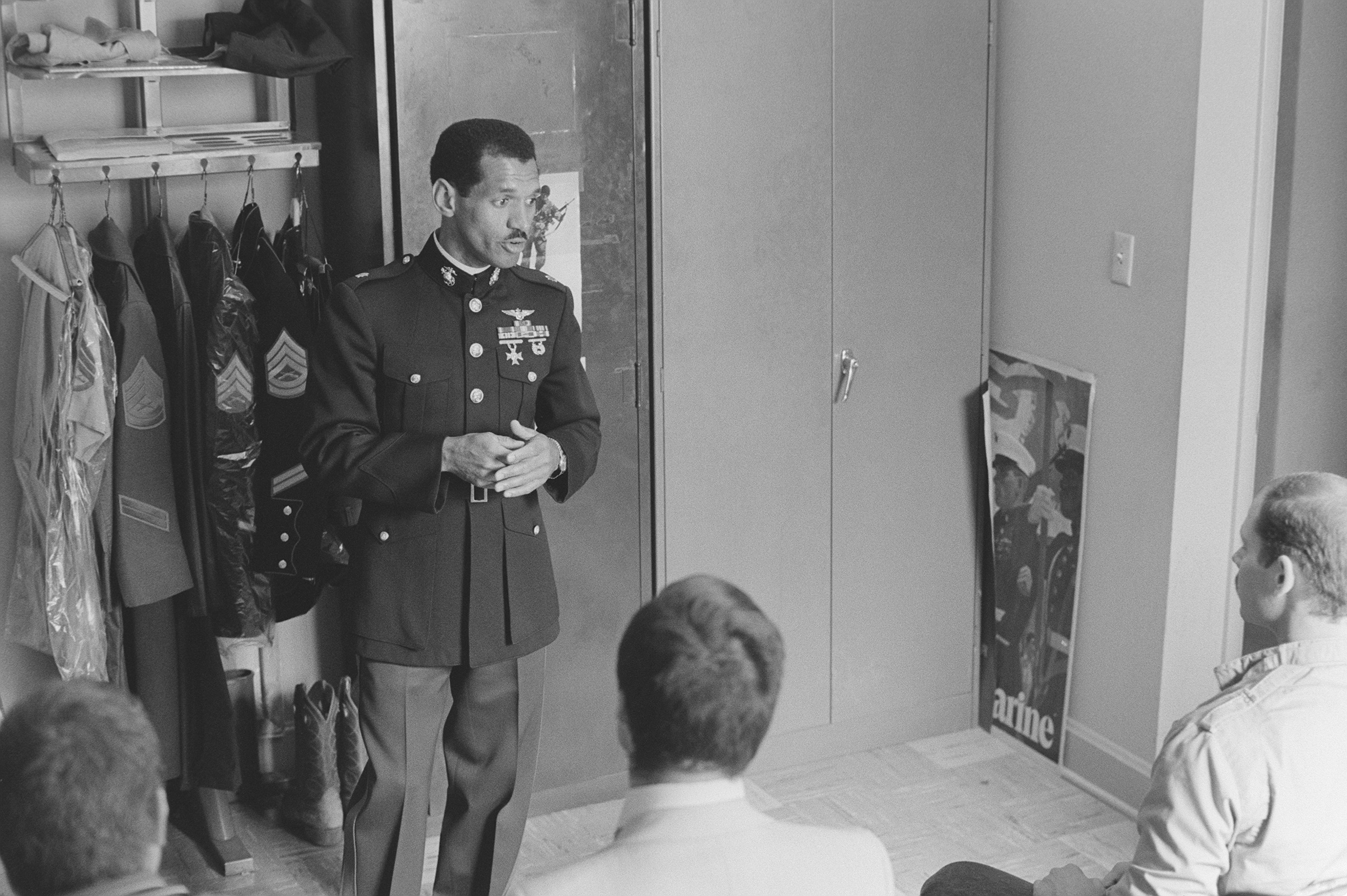
Bolden speaking at a USMC recruiting event in 1982

Bolden was selected as an astronaut candidate by NASA in 1980. He was a member of the NASA Astronaut Corps until 1994 when he returned to assignments in the Marine Corps, first as the Deputy Commandant of Midshipmen at the Naval Academy, effective June 27, 1994. In July 1997, he was assigned as the Deputy Commanding General of I Marine Expeditionary Force. From February to June 1998, he served as Commanding General, I MEF (Forward) in support of Operation Desert Thunder in Kuwait. In July 1998, he was promoted to his final rank of major general and assumed his duties as the Deputy Commander, United States Forces Japan. He then served as the Commanding General, 3rd Marine Aircraft Wing, from August 9, 2000, until August 2002. He retired from the military in August 2004.

== NASA career ==
Selected by NASA in May 1980, Bolden became an astronaut in August 1981. He was one of several astronauts recruited by Nichelle Nichols as part of a NASA effort to increase the number of minority and female astronauts. His technical assignments included: Astronaut Office Safety Officer; Technical Assistant to the Director of Flight Crew Operations; Special Assistant to the Director of the Johnson Space Center; Astronaut Office Liaison to the Safety, Reliability and Quality Assurance Directorates of the Marshall Space Flight Center (MSFC) and the Kennedy Space Center (KSC); Chief of the Safety Division at JSC; Lead Astronaut for Vehicle Test and Checkout at the Kennedy Space Center; and Assistant Deputy Administrator, NASA Headquarters.

A veteran of four space flights, he has logged over 680 hours in space. Bolden served as pilot on STS-61-C (January 12–18, 1986) and STS-31 (April 24–29, 1990), and was the mission commander on STS-45 (March 24 – April 2, 1992), and STS-60 (February 3–11, 1994).

Bolden was the first person to ride the Launch Complex 39 slidewire baskets which enable rapid escape from a Space Shuttle on the launch pad. The need for a human test was determined following a launch abort on STS-41-D where controllers were afraid to order the crew to use the untested escape system.

A few years before his appointment by President Barack Obama to be administrator of NASA, Bolden auditioned, along with professional actors, for the role of virtual host for NASA's "Shuttle Launch Experience" educational attraction at the Kennedy Space Center Visitor Complex in Merritt Island, Florida.

=== Spaceflights ===
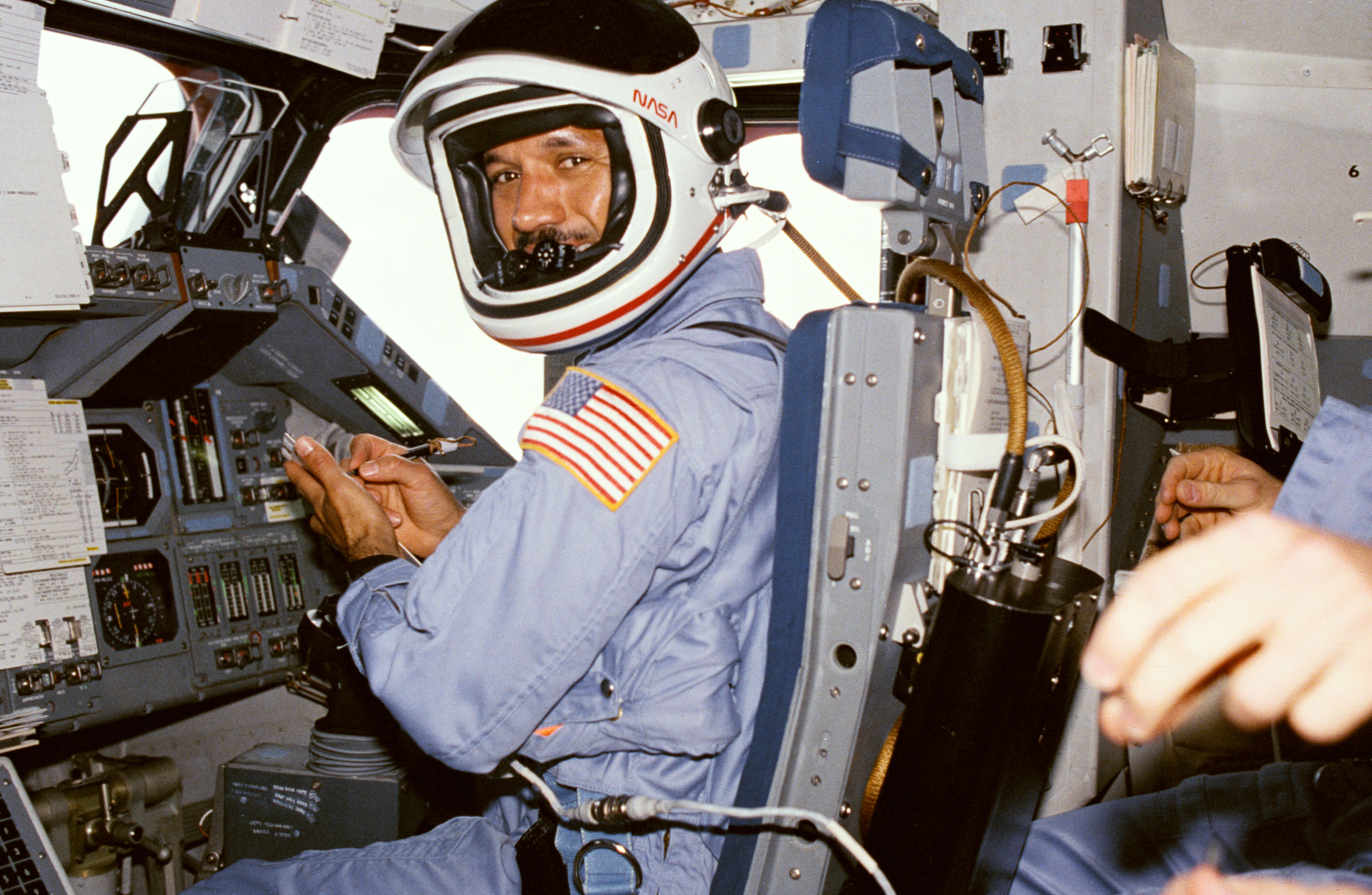
Bolden on the flight deck of Columbia during STS-61-C

On STS-61-C, Bolden piloted Space Shuttle Columbia. During the six-day flight, crew members deployed the SATCOM Ku-band satellite and conducted experiments in astrophysics and materials processing. The mission launched from Kennedy Space Center on January 12, 1986, orbited the Earth 96 times, and ended with a successful night landing at Edwards Air Force Base, California on January 18, 1986. Coincidently, Senator Bill Nelson, who like Bolden would also go on to serve as a NASA Administrator, also flew on STS-61-C as a payload specialist. STS-61-C was the final mission before the Space Shuttle Challenger disaster.

Bolden piloted Space Shuttle Discovery during STS-31. Launched on April 24, 1990, from Kennedy Space Center, the crew spent the five-day mission deploying the Hubble Space Telescope and conducting a variety of mid-deck experiments. They also used a variety of cameras, including both the IMAX in cabin and cargo bay cameras, for Earth observations from their record-setting altitude of over 400 miles. Following 75 orbits of Earth in 121 hours, Discovery landed at Edwards Air Force Base on April 29, 1990.

On STS-45, Bolden commanded a crew of seven aboard Space Shuttle Atlantis, launched on March 24, 1992, from Kennedy Space Center. STS-45 was the first Spacelab mission dedicated to NASA's "Mission to Planet Earth". During the nine-day mission, the crew operated the twelve experiments that constituted the ATLAS-1 (Atmospheric Laboratory for Applications and Science) cargo. ATLAS-1 obtained detailed measurements of atmospheric chemical and physical properties. In addition, this was the first time an artificial beam of electrons was used to stimulate an auroral discharge. Following 143 orbits of Earth, Atlantis landed at Kennedy Space Center on April 2, 1992.

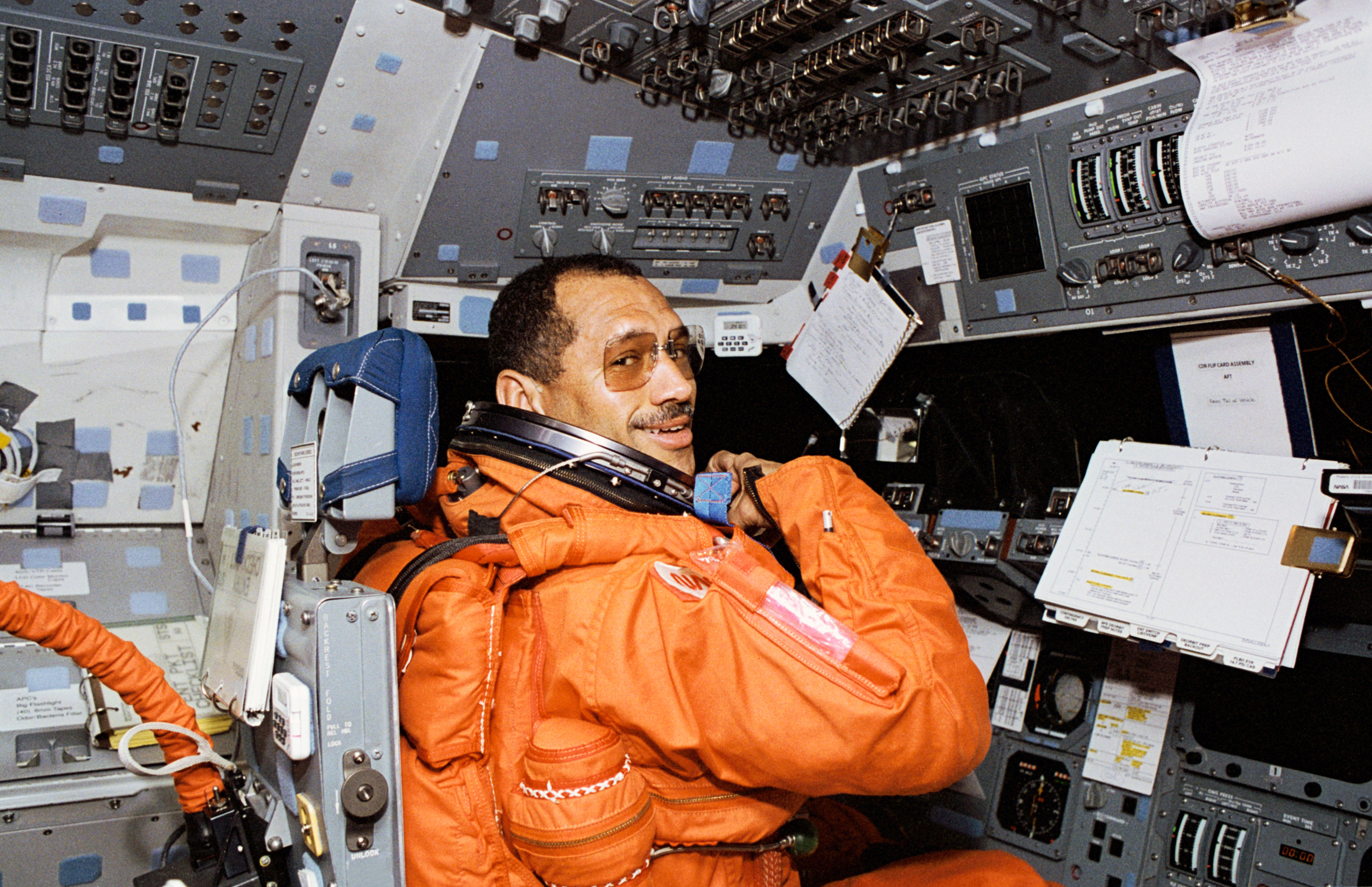
Bolden on the flight deck of Discovery during STS-60

Bolden commanded STS-60's crew of six aboard Discovery. This was the historic first joint-American–Russian Space Shuttle mission involving the participation of a Russian cosmonaut, Sergei Krikalev, as a mission specialist. The flight launched on February 3, 1994, from Kennedy Space Center, and carried the Space Habitation Module-2 (SPACEHAB-2), and the Wake Shield Facility. The crew conducted a series of joint American/Russian science activities. The mission achieved 130 orbits of the Earth, ending with a landing on February 11, 1994, at the Kennedy Space Center.

=== Administrator of NASA ===
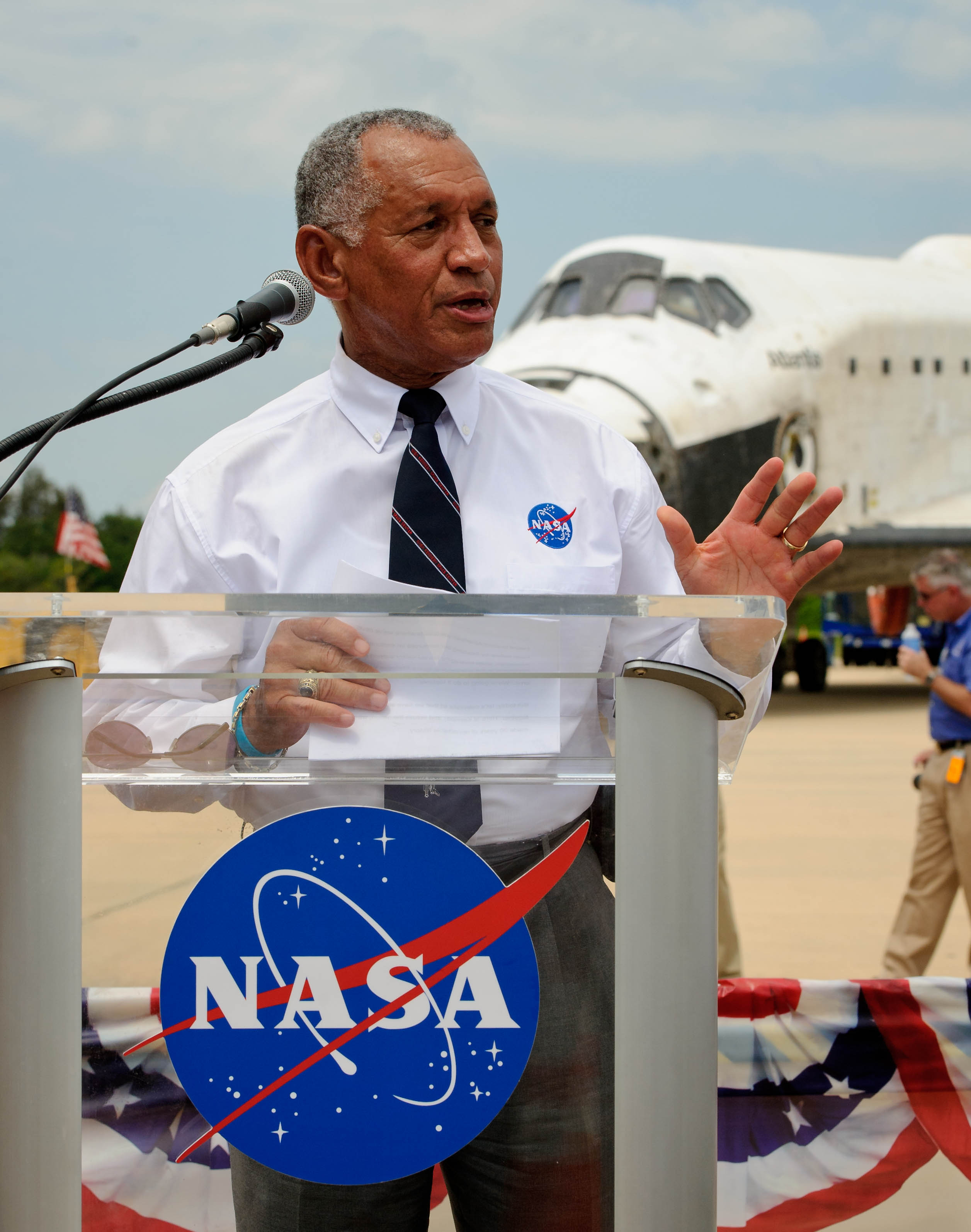
Bolden speaks after landing of the last Space Shuttle mission, STS-135.

In 2009, President Obama appointed Bolden to be administrator of NASA.

In a NASA video published April 28, 2010, titled "NASA's New Era of Innovation and Discovery", Bolden said, "We're going to turn science fiction into science fact".

On the same day, at a question and answer session with employees at the Johnson Space Center, Bolden compared the Constellation Program to a stillborn baby calf extracted from a camel's womb by U.S. Marines. Bolden said, "We've got some stillborn calves around, and we have got to figure out ways to help each other bring them back to life".

In a June 2010 interview with Al Jazeera, Bolden said that the top three goals he was tasked with by President Obama were to help re-inspire children to want to get into science and math, to expand NASA's international relationships, and, "perhaps foremost", "to reach out to the Muslim world ... to help them feel good about their historic contribution to science... and math and engineering". The White House disagreed with Bolden's statement, with the press secretary saying Bolden probably misspoke and "That was not his task, and that's not the task of NASA".

Bolden said his agency's long-term ambition is landing astronauts on Mars. He has cited spending cuts as a concern for major NASA projects.

On August 28, 2012, he was the first human being to have his voice broadcast on the surface of Mars. Although the rover has no speakers, it received the transmission of his voice and then beamed it back to Earth.

In 2013, he noted the National Aerospace Week as Administrator of NASA.

On October 28, 2015, Bolden presented the next steps for a human journey to Mars at the Center for American Progress in Washington, D.C.

On January 12, 2017, Bolden announced his resignation from NASA during a Town Hall meeting at NASA Headquarters in Washington D.C. His last day would be January 19, and Robert M. Lightfoot Jr. was announced as acting NASA administrator.

After leaving NASA, Bolden has served on the United Arab Emirates Space Advisory Committee.

== Personal life ==
Bolden lives in Alexandria, Virginia, and is married to Alexis (née Walker); the couple have two children. Bolden is a Christian, stating in a question and answer session in May 2010:

You know, the universe is a big place. I'm a practicing Christian, so in my faith, I learn about omnipotent, omnipresent God, which means he's everywhere. He's all-knowing. He does everything. And I just cannot bring my little pea brain to believe that a God like that would pick one planet of one of millions of suns and say that's the only place in the vast universe that I'm going to put any kind of life. And so the problem is I haven't been far enough away.

In the 2024 United States presidential election, Bolden endorsed Kamala Harris.

== Awards ==
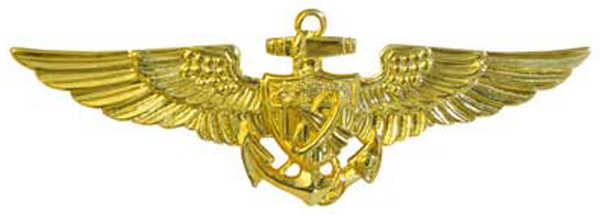

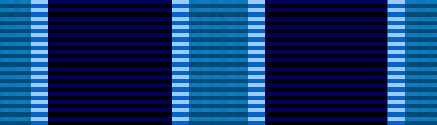

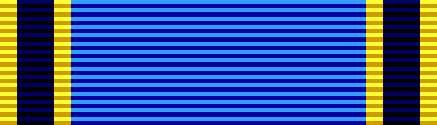

Navy Astronaut Badge
Defense Distinguished Service Medal	Navy Distinguished Service Medal	Defense Superior Service Medal	Legion of Merit w/ 1 award star
Distinguished Flying Cross	Defense Meritorious Service Medal w/ 1 oak leaf cluster	Air Medal w/ 1 award star & Strike/Flight numeral 8	Navy Unit Commendation
NASA Outstanding Leadership Medal	NASA Exceptional Service Medal w/ 2 award stars	NASA Space Flight Medal w/ 3 award stars	National Defense Service Medal w/ 1 service star
Vietnam Service Medal w/ 2 service stars	Marine Corps Recruiting Ribbon	Vietnam Gallantry Cross; Unit Citation with Palm	Vietnam Campaign Medal

== Honors ==
- Honorary Doctor of Science Degree from the University of South Carolina – 1984
- Honorary Doctor of Humane Letters from Winthrop College – 1986
- University of Southern California's Alumni Award of Merit – 1989
- Honorary Doctor of Humane Letters from Johnson C. Smith University – 1990
- Honorary Doctor of Engineering from Rensselaer Polytechnic Institute – 2008
- Honorary Doctor of Laws from Monmouth University – 2011
- Honorary Doctor of Public Service from the University of Maryland University College – 2012
- Honorary Doctor of Engineering from the University of Bristol – 2014
- National Space Trophy – 2014
- Honorary Doctor of Science from Rochester Institute of Technology – 2015
- Honorary Doctor from Bar-Ilan University – 2016
- Nierenberg Prize – 2016
- Inducted into the National Aviation Hall of Fame in 2017
- Honorary Doctor of Science from University of Arizona – 2017
- Carl Sagan Award for Public Appreciation of Science – 2017
- International Space Hall of Fame – 1997
- Member of the National Academy of Engineering – 2020
- Wright Brothers Memorial Trophy, 2020
- Honorary Doctor of Humane Letters from Embry-Riddle Aeronautical University – 2022
- Mani L. Bhaumik Breakthrough of the Year Award - 2022
- National Air and Space Museum Trophy for Lifetime Achievement

== See also ==
- List of African-American astronauts
- List of notable United States Marines

Government offices
Preceded by Christopher Scolese; Acting	Administrator of NASA; 2009–2017	Succeeded by Jim Bridenstine
