= List of librarians =

This is a list of notable librarians and people who have advanced libraries and librarianship. Also included are people primarily notable for other endeavors, such as politicians and writers, who have also worked as librarians.

== List of people known for contributions to the library profession ==
=== A–E ===
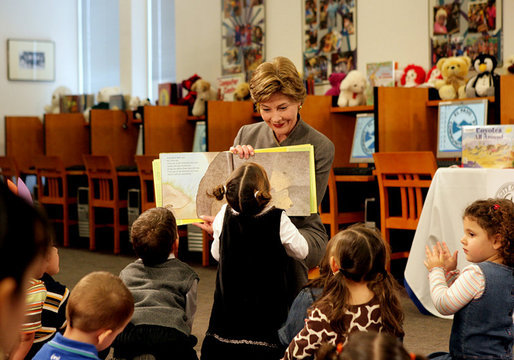
Laura Bush, First Lady of the United States and librarian, reads a book to children in a school library in Texas.

- Ada Adler
- Mary Eileen Ahern
- Camila Alire
- Edna Allyn – first librarian of the Hawaii State Library
- Lester Asheim
- Ashurbanipal II
- Sarah B. Askew – pioneered the establishment of county libraries in the United States
- Basil Atkinson
- Derek Austin
- Winifred Austin – pioneer of UK Library for the blind
- Henriette Avram – MARC standards developer
- Antoine Alexandre Barbier
- John Davis Barnett – Canadian curator–librarian
- John J. Beckley – first Librarian of Congress; politician
- Pura Belpré – librarian and author
- Sanford Berman
- Bob Berring – law librarian
- Guy Berthiaume – 3rd Librarian and Archivist of Canada
- John Carlo Bertot – library educator, researcher, editor of The Library Quarterly
- Anastasius Bibliothecarius
- James H. Billington – 13th librarian of Congress; historian
- Robert H. Blackburn – former chief librarian of the University of Toronto
- Thomas Bodley – founder of the Bodleian Library; English diplomat; 1545–1613
- Arna Bontemps – author, bibliographer, and Fisk University librarian
- Daniel J. Boorstin – 12th Librarian of Congress; historian
- Marjorie Adele Blackistone Bradfield – as the Detroit Public Library's first African-American librarian, expanded its African-American literature collection
- Aase Bredsdorff (1919–2017) – Danish library inspector specialising in children's literature
- Joseph Penn Breedlove – Duke University librarian
- Wallace Breem – novelist and law librarian
- Suzanne Briet
- James Duff Brown (1862–1914) – first Chief Librarian of Islington Libraries, pioneer of open access libraries, and creator of classification systems
- Douglas Brymner – first Dominion Archivist (National Archivist) of Canada
- Frank J. Burgoyne (1858–1913) – author and librarian at Lambeth Libraries
- Edward Dundas Butler – translator and senior librarian at the Department of Printed Books, British Museum
- Lee Pierce Butler
- Andrew Carnegie – Scottish-American industrialist and philanthropist who financed thousands of libraries around the world
- Leon Carnovsky
- Daniel J. Caron – 2nd Librarian and Archivist of Canada
- Amalia Kahana-Carmon
- Ruth French Carnovsky (1906–2003)
- Roch Carrier – 4th National Librarian of Canada
- Mayme Agnew Clayton
- Cecilia Cleve (d. 1819) – Swedish pioneer librarian
- Morris L. Cohen – attorney, law librarian and professor of law at the University at Buffalo, University of Pennsylvania, Harvard Law School and Yale Law School
- Marjorie Cotton – first professionally qualified children's librarian in New South Wales, Australia
- Andrea Crestadoro
- Charles Ammi Cutter
- Laura Dallapiccola – Italian librarian and translator
- John Cotton Dana (1856–1931)
- Robert Darnton
- Lorcan Dempsey
- Beryl May Dent – mathematical physicist, technical librarian at Metropolitan-Vickers, honorary secretary of ASLIB branch
- Melvil Dewey
- William S. Dix
- Naomi Pollard Dobson
- Arthur Doughty – 2nd Dominion Archivist (National Archivist) of Canada and Keeper of the Public Records
- Leaonead Pack Drain-Bailey (1906–1983), Head of Library at West Virginia State University
- Mollie E. Dunlap
- Karl Franz Otto Dziatzko
- Linda Eastman
- Margaret A. Edwards
- El Sayed Mahmoud El Sheniti – seminal figure in professional librarianship in Egypt
- Shirley Elliott, legislative librarian of Nova Scotia
- Theresa Elmendorf
- Miriam Eshkol
- Luther H. Evans – 10th Librarian of Congress
- Woody Evans
- Oliver Everett
- Chinwe Nwogo Ezeani – first female University Librarian at University of Nigeria, Nsukka

=== F–M ===
- Johann Albert Fabricius – bibliographer
- Mary Cutler Fairchild – pioneer library educator
- Adele M. Fasick – historical fiction writer, library science scholar, professor
- David Ferriero – former M.I.T librarian and current Archivist of the United States
- Edith Firth (1927–2005) – librarian for the Toronto Public Library
- Anette Fischer (1946–1992) – librarian and human rights activist
- Herman H. Fussler
- Elizabeth Futas – director of the University of Rhode Island's Graduate School of Library and Information Studies
- Mary Virginia Gaver
- Helen Thornton Geer – ALA Headquarters librarian, author, consultant, and professor
- Johann Matthias Gesner – bibliographer
- Kenneth MacLean Glazier Sr. – Canadian librarian
- Eliza Atkins Gleason – first African American to receive doctorate of Library Science
- Frederick R. Goff – incunabula scholar
- Michael Gorman
- Belle da Costa Greene - first librarian of the J.P. Morgan Library and Museum
- Jan Gruter – scholar
- Camilla Gryski
- Helen E. Haines
- Lillian Haydon Childress Hall – first professionally trained African American librarian in Indiana
- Spencer Hall – librarian of the Athenaeum Club, London
- Adelaide Hasse
- Peter Havard-Williams – librarian educator
- Carla Hayden – public librarian, former ALA President, 14th Librarian of Congress
- John Russell Hayes – librarian of Quaker history and culture
- Frances E. Henne
- Wolfgang Herrmann – librarian; member of Nazi Purification Committee
- Caroline Hewins
- John Howard Hickcox Sr.
- Ted Hines
- Cecil Hobbs – American scholar of Southeast Asian history, head of the Southern Asia Section of the Orientalia (now Asian) Division of the Library of Congress, a major contributor to scholarship on Asia and the development of South East Asian coverage in American library collections
- Judith Hoffberg – art librarian
- Zoia Horn – American librarian jailed for refusing to divulge information that violated her belief in intellectual freedom
- Laura E. Howey – American librarian, educator, social reformer
- Jean Blackwell Hutson – chief of Schomburg Center for Research in Black Culture
- Thomas James
- Anne Jarvis
- Thomas Jefferson – sold his library to the Library of Congress
- Charles Coffin Jewett
- Carleton B. Joeckel
- Virginia Lacy Jones – major figure in the integration of public and academic libraries
- Mildred M. Jordan – president of the Medical Library Association and medical librarian at Emory University
- E. J. Josey
- Gene Joseph – founding librarian of the Xwi7xwa Library at the University of British Columbia and the first librarian of First Nations descent in British Columbia, Canada
- Muhammad Siddiq Khan
- Mohammad Khatami – former President of Iran; previously Head of National Library of Iran
- Frederick Kilgour
- Mary A. Kingsbury – American school library pioneer
- Anastasiya Kobzarenko
- Judith Krug – forty-year leader of the American Library Association's Office of Intellectual Freedom
- Nadezhda Konstantinovna Krupskaya – wife of Lenin
- William Kaye Lamb – first National Librarian of Canada
- Frederick Wilfrid Lancaster
- Gustave Lanctot – 3rd Dominion Archivist (National Archivist) of Canada
- Philip Larkin
- Louise Payson Latimer
- Margaret Leiteritz – painter who based her work of scientific items which she knew as a librarian
- Anne Grodzins Lipow – founder of Library Solutions Institute and Press
- Gladys Edson Locke - Boston Public Library cataloguer, writer
- Audre Lorde – 20th-century US poet and activist
- John G. Lorenz -Acting Librarian of Congress, executive director, Association of Research Libraries
- Eleanor Young Love – African-American librarian from Kentucky
- Seymour Lubetzky
- Roderick Samson Mabomba – Malawian librarian
- Archibald MacLeish – 9th Librarian of Congress; Pulitzer Prize poet
- Alison Macrina – founder of the Librarian Freedom Project
- Patrick Magruder – 2nd Librarian of Congress; politician
- Mary Helen Mahar – president of the New York Library Association in 1950
- Margaret Mann – library educator, particularly cataloging; founding faculty member at University of Michigan library science program (1926)
- Allie Beth Martin
- Harry S. Martin – former Head Librarian, Harvard Law Library
- Kathleen de la Peña McCook – library scholar, public librarian, free speech advocate, and author
- John Silva Meehan – 4th Librarian of Congress
- Florence Milnes – first BBC librarian
- August Molinier – French historian
- Eric Moon – editor of Library Journal
- Anne Carroll Moore – pioneering children's librarian
- Everett T. Moore – freedom of information
- Elizabeth Homer Morton – important contributions to development of Canadian libraries
- Isadore Gilbert Mudge – edited Guide to Resource Works
- L. Quincy Mumford – 11th Librarian of Congress
- Alan Noel Latimer Munby – English librarian, bibliographical scholar and author
- Ludovico Antonio Muratori – Italian librarian, archivist and historian
- Muskan Ahirwar – at 9 years old she created a community library for children in the worker's colony where she lives.

=== N–Z ===
- Gerhard Brandt Naeseth – Norwegian-American Genealogical Center and Naeseth Library in Madison, Wisconsin
- Makoto Nagao – 19th Director of National Diet Library of Japan; computer scientist specializing in digital library
- Bonnie Nardi – information scientist
- Gabriel Naudé
- Malcolm Neesam – county music and audiovisual librarian for York, England
- Howard Nixon
- Margaret Cross Norton
- Ekei Essien Oku – first Nigerian women chief librarian
- Paul Otlet
- John Henry Pyle Pafford
- Antonio Panizzi – chief librarian of the British Museum library
- Ingrid Parent – librarian at the University of British Columbia
- Ann Parham - led the restoration of the Pentagon Library after its destruction during the September 11 attacks
- Charles V. Park – librarian at Central Michigan University
- Lotsee Patterson – librarian, educator, and founder of the American Indian Library Association
- Nancy Pearl – librarian and author
- Mary Wright Plummer
- Effie Louise Power
- Herbert Putnam – 8th Librarian of Congress
- S.R. Ranganathan – librarian and mathematician from India, known for his five laws of library science and the development of the colon classification
- Neil Ratliff
- W. Boyd Rayward
- Fremont Rider
- Jane, Lady Roberts (1949–2021) – UK Royal Librarian (2002–2013)
- Charlemae Hill Rollins
- Loriene Roy – first Native American president of the American Library Association
- Frances Clarke Sayers
- Louis A. Schultheiss
- Patricia G. Schuman
- Marvin H. Scilken
- Margaret Scoggin – young adult librarian
- Marianne Scott – 3rd National Librarian of Canada; 1st woman to be appointed to the role
- Ralph R. Shaw
- Spencer Shaw (1916–2010) – American children's librarian and educator
- Dorothy Shea (1941–2024) – Librarian of the Supreme Court of Tasmania (1988–2016) and president of the Australian Law Librarians' Association (2004–2005)
- Jesse Shera
- Louis Shores
- Regina Smith – librarian at Jenkins Law Library, a membership library in Philadelphia
- Wilfred I. Smith – 5th Dominion Archivist (National Archivist) of Canada
- Frances Lander Spain (1903–1999) – American Library Association President 1960–61
- Ainsworth Rand Spofford – 6th Librarian of Congress
- John G. Stephenson – 5th Librarian of Congress
- Mari Strachan – 21st-century Welsh novelist in English
- Suetonius – Roman historian and archivist
- Peggy Sullivan
- Don R. Swanson
- Friedrich Sylburg – 16th-century German scholar
- Guy Sylvestre – 2nd National Librarian of Canada
- John Szabo – City Librarian of the Los Angeles Public Library and National Medal for Museum and Library Service recipient
- Henry Richard Tedder – librarian of the Athenaeum Club, London
- Florence Davy Thompson – founding librarian at the University of Manitoba
- Ella May Thornton - Georgia State Librarian
- Arnulfo Trejo – U.S. Hispanic-American librarian
- John Tsebe - Former CEO of the National Library of South Africa (NLSA)
- Gottfried van Swieten – Austrian Imperial librarian 1777–1803; introduced first card catalog
- Eva Verona
- Brian Campbell Vickery
- Jean-Pierre Wallot – 6th Dominion/National Archivist of Canada
- Douglas Waples
- George Watterston – 3rd Librarian of Congress
- Leslie Weir – 4th Librarian and Archivist of Canada; 1st woman to be appointed to the role
- Jessamyn West
- Edwina Whitney – librarian at the University of Connecticut
- John Wilkin – digital library management researcher
- Ian E. Wilson – 7th National Archivist of Canada, and 1st Librarian and Archivist of Canada
- Louis Round Wilson
- Patrick Wilson
- Marianne Winder – librarian at the Wellcome Institute for the History of Medicine
- Justin Winsor – Harvard University librarian
- Mary Elizabeth Wood – promoted Western librarianship practices and programs in China
- Lawrence C. Wroth – librarian at the John Carter Brown Library at Brown University
- Ella Gaines Yates
- Victor Yngve
- John Russell Young – 7th Librarian of Congress; journalist
- Zenodotus – first superintendent of Library of Alexandria; scholar of the 3rd century BC
- Shen Zurong – father of library science in China

== One-time librarians noted for other accomplishments ==
- Reinaldo Arenas – Cuban author
- Ben Barkow
- Roland Barthes – French writer and philosopher
- Georges Bataille – French writer
- Ludwig Bechstein – German author
- Thomas Berger – American novelist
- Hector Berlioz – French composer; librarian, Paris Conservatoire
- Arna Bontemps – French artist
- Jorge Luis Borges – author and poet
- John Braine – British novelist
- Emma L. Brock – children's book author and illustrator, and librarian at the Minneapolis Public library and NYPL
- Dee Brown – wrote Bury My Heart at Wounded Knee
- Callimachus – poet
- Roch Carrier – novelist
- Lewis Carroll – author
- Giacomo Casanova
- Isaac Casaubon
- Cassiodorus
- Beverly Cleary – novelist
- Joanna Cole – children's book author and librarian
- Ina Coolbrith – poet and librarian
- Frank Coombs – U.S. politician; State Librarian of California, 1898–1899
- Gratia Countryman – Minneapolis librarian
- Pierre François le Courayer – 18th-century theologian
- Evelyn Crowell – librarian, author, speaker, activist, and community organizer
- Harinath De – linguist
- John Dee – Renaissance magician
- A. Brian Deer – librarian from Kahnawake who developed a library classification system that gave rise to the Brian Deer Classification System
- Hal Draper
- Marcel Duchamp
- Will Durant – historian
- Eratosthenes
- Frank Ferko – composer
- Benjamin Franklin
- Stephen Gaselee – diplomat
- Edmund Gosse
- Ed Greenwood – author
- Francis Hayman – English artist
- Elizabeth Heaps
- Edward Singleton Holden – U.S. astronomer
- J. Edgar Hoover – first director of the Federal Bureau of Investigation
- David Hume – philosopher
- Hypatia (c. 350–370 – March 415)
- Mohammad Khatami – Iranian president and scholar
- Annette Curtis Klause – author of children's books
- Stanley Kunitz – former United States Poet Laureate; editor of Wilson Library Bulletin, 1927–1943
- Lao Tsu
- Madeleine L'Engle – 20th-century novelist
- Gottfried Wilhelm von Leibniz – mathematician and philosopher
- Gotthold Ephraim Lessing – German playwright and poet
- Wilhelm Lexis – German economist
- Li Dazhao – Chinese revolutionary politician
- Audre Lorde – 20th-century US poet and activist
- Archibald MacLeish – author; Librarian of Congress, 1939–1944
- Mao Zedong – Chinese revolutionary politician
- Vaunda Micheaux Nelson – author and librarian
- Andre Norton – science-fiction author
- Walter A. O'Brien – U.S. politician; commissioned original version of the song "Charlie on the M.T.A."
- Christopher Okigbo – Nigerian poet
- Major Owens – U.S. House of Representatives (D-NY)
- Andrew K. Pace – author
- Coventry Patmore – 19th-century UK poet
- Kit Pearson – Canadian writer; winner of the 1997 Governor General's Award for English language children's literature
- Benjamin Peirce – logician
- Per Petterson – Norwegian author
- Charles Pickering
- Marcel Proust – French author
- Philip Pullman – fantasy novelist
- Ken Roberts – author
- Greg Dean Schmitz – online film journalist
- Eleanor Roosevelt Seagraves – granddaughter of Franklin D. Roosevelt
- Steve Roud (b. 1949) – creator of the Roud Folk Song Index and authority on folklore and superstition
- Sima Qian – Chinese historian
- Lynne Stewart – American lawyer
- June Tabor – British singer
- Elizabeth Taylor
- Edward J. Thomas – scholar of Buddhism
- Jeannette Throckmorton - president, State Society of Iowa Medical Women; vice-president, Royal Institute of Public Health (London)
- Anne Tyler – novelist
- Wallace Van Jackson – American librarian and civil rights activist
- Angus Wilson – novelist

=== Librarians noted as spouses of national leaders ===
- Laura Bush – served as First Lady of the United States married to president, George W.Bush
- Ingrid Carlsson – wife of Ingvar Carlsson
- Miriam Eshkol – wife of Israeli Prime Minister Levi Eshkol.
- Nadezhda Krupskaya – wife of Vladimir Lenin

== See also ==
- List of fictional librarians
- List of female librarians
- List of libraries
