= Parham (surname) =

Parham is an English surname.

Parham is a habitational name derived from villages named Parham in Suffolk (in the East of England) and Sussex (in South East England). It is derived from the Old English words pere meaning "pear", and hām meaning "homestead" (alternatively, from hamm meaning "water meadow"). Early known bearers include Turmod de Perham (Marlesford, Suffolk) mentioned in the 1086 Domesday Book and William de Perreham mentioned in the 1187 Pipe rolls of Sussex. Variants of the surname include Perram, Parram, and Perham.

== People ==
- Ann Parham, American librarian
- Arthur Parham (1883–1961), English bishop
- Charles Fox Parham (1873–1929), American preacher instrumental in the formation of Pentecostalism
- Donald Parham (born 1997), American football player
- Dylan Parham (born 1999), American football player
- Easy Parham (1921–1982), American professional basketball player
- Sir Frederick Parham (1901–1991), Royal Navy admiral
- H. B. Richenda Parham, (1862–1947) British writer and amateur botanist in Fiji
- Lennon Parham (born 1976), American actress
- Lucy Parham (born 1966), British concert pianist
- Nora Parham (1927–1963), Belizean woman executed for murder
- Philip Parham (born 1960), British ambassador
- Robert Parham (born 1966), American kickboxer
- Tiny Parham (1900–1943), Canadian-born American jazz bandleader and pianist
- Truck Parham (1911–2002), American jazz double-bassist
