= Parham =

Parham may refer to:

== People ==
- Parham (surname), a surname of Anglo-Saxon English origin

== Places ==
=== Antigua and Barbuda ===
- Parham, Antigua and Barbuda, that claims to be the oldest town on Antigua
- Parham Peninsula

=== Australia ===
- Parham, South Australia, also known as Port Parham

=== Canada ===
- Parham, Ontario

=== England ===
- Parham, Suffolk
- Parham Airfield Museum
- Parham, West Sussex
- Parham Park, the area surrounding Parham House

=== India ===
- Parham, Uttar Pradesh, a village in Firozabad District

=== United States ===
- Parham, Mississippi

== Other ==
- Parham Attack, an unusual chess opening
