= Unander =

Unander is a surname. Notable people with the surname include:

- Carl Unander-Scharin (born 1964), Swedish opera singer
- Eva Unander (1774–1836), Swedish librarian
- Hans Unander (born 1970), Swedish politician
- Wiktor Unander (1872–1967), Swedish Army officer
