= Rockwell, North Carolina =

- Town
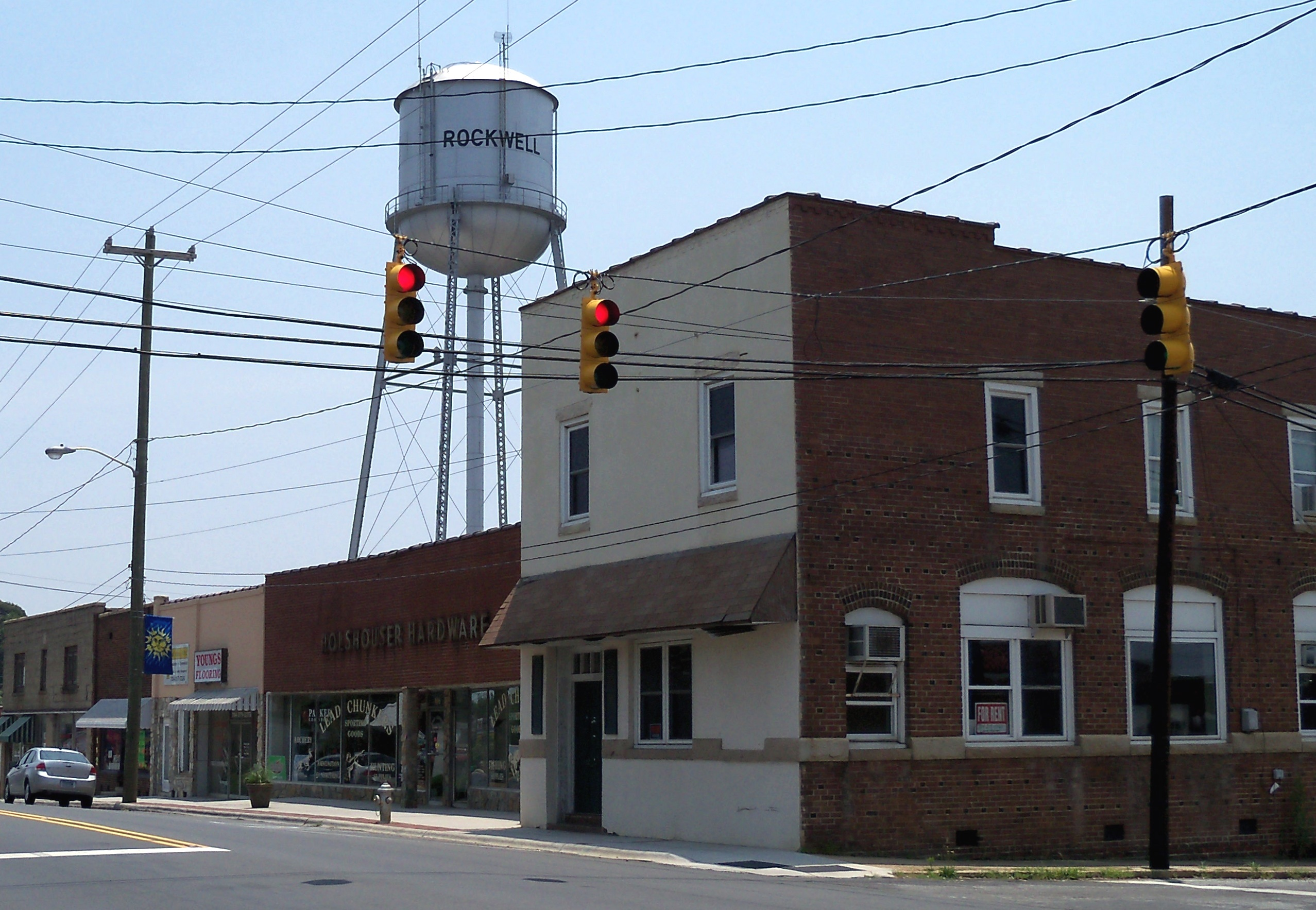

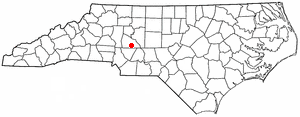
- Location of Rockwell, North Carolina
- Coordinates: 35°33′11″N 80°24′33″W
- Country: United States
- State: North Carolina
- County: Rowan

Area
  - Total: 1.85 sq mi (4.79 km^{2})
  - Land: 1.85 sq mi (4.79 km^{2})
  - Water: 0 sq mi (0.00 km^{2})
- Elevation: 781 ft (238 m)

Population (2020)
  - Total: 2,302
  - Density: 1,245.6/sq mi (480.94/km^{2})
- Time zone: UTC-5 (Eastern (EST))
  - Summer (DST): UTC-4 (EDT)
- ZIP code: 28138
- Area code: 704
- FIPS code: 37-57340
- GNIS feature ID: 2407232

Rockwell is a town in Rowan County, North Carolina, United States. The population was 2,302 at the 2020 census.

== History ==
The George Matthias Bernhardt House, Grace Evangelical and Reformed Church, and Zion Lutheran Church are listed on the National Register of Historic Places.

== Geography ==
According to the United States Census Bureau, the town has a total area of 1.7 square miles (4.4 km^{2}), all land.

== Demographics ==
Historical population
Census	Pop.	Note	%±
1910	249		—
1920	453		81.9%
1930	696		53.6%
1940	825		18.5%
1950	852		3.3%
1960	948		11.3%
1970	999		5.4%
1980	1,339		34.0%
1990	1,598		19.3%
2000	1,971		23.3%
2010	2,108		7.0%
2020	2,302		9.2%
U.S. Decennial Census

=== 2020 census ===
As of the 2020 census, Rockwell had a population of 2,302. The median age was 37.9 years. 25.7% of residents were under the age of 18 and 17.6% of residents were 65 years of age or older. For every 100 females there were 89.8 males, and for every 100 females age 18 and over there were 87.6 males age 18 and over.

99.7% of residents lived in urban areas, while 0.3% lived in rural areas.

There were 880 households and 556 families in Rockwell, of which 36.8% had children under the age of 18 living in them. Of all households, 50.8% were married-couple households, 14.4% were households with a male householder and no spouse or partner present, and 27.4% were households with a female householder and no spouse or partner present. About 23.4% of all households were made up of individuals and 11.9% had someone living alone who was 65 years of age or older.

There were 951 housing units, of which 7.5% were vacant. The homeowner vacancy rate was 3.2% and the rental vacancy rate was 1.8%.

Rockwell racial composition
Race	Number	Percentage
White (non-Hispanic)	1,970	85.58%
Black or African American (non-Hispanic)	85	3.69%
Native American	5	0.22%
Asian	18	0.78%
Pacific Islander	2	0.09%
Other/Mixed	112	4.87%
Hispanic or Latino	110	4.78%

=== 2000 census ===
As of the census of 2000, there were 1,971 people, 744 households, and 552 families residing in the town. The population density was 1,183.8 inhabitants per square mile (457.1/km^{2}). There were 781 housing units at an average density of 469.1 per square mile (181.1/km^{2}). The racial makeup of the town was 97.21% White, 0.71% African American, 0.05% Native American, 0.56% Asian, 0.76% from other races, and 0.71% from two or more races. Hispanic or Latino of any race were 1.57% of the population.

There were 744 households, out of which 35.5% had children under the age of 18 living with them, 59.8% were married couples living together, 10.5% had a female householder with no husband present, and 25.7% were non-families. 23.3% of all households were made up of individuals, and 11.8% had someone living alone who was 65 years of age or older. The average household size was 2.52 and the average family size was 2.96.

In the town, the population was spread out, with 25.6% under the age of 18, 7.7% from 18 to 24, 28.4% from 25 to 44, 20.6% from 45 to 64, and 17.7% who were 65 years of age or older. The median age was 38 years. For every 100 females, there were 87.9 males. For every 100 females age 18 and over, there were 83.8 males.

The median income for a household in the town was $41,488, and the median income for a family was $47,935. Males had a median income of $31,763 versus $23,304 for females. The per capita income for the town was $19,687. About 3.6% of families and 4.6% of the population were below the poverty line, including 4.4% of those under age 18 and 9.1% of those age 65 or over.

== Education ==
Rockwell Elementary School- Rockets- Rockwell Christian School- Shive Elementary School- Grace Academy

Rockwell Elementary School, formerly known as Rockwell School, was built in 1928. It combined a total of eighteen one and two room school houses within the eastern part of Rowan County. Until 1959, Rockwell School housed grades 1-12. Beginning in 1959, Rockwell housed grades 1–6. In 1973, Kindergarten was added and made Rockwell a K-6 school. In 1990, Rowan County changed all of the elementary schools to K-5 and this configuration is still in place today.

== Library ==
The East Branch of the Rowan Public Library (whose main facility is in Salisbury) is located in Rockwell.

== Places of worship ==
- Bethel Baptist Church
- First Baptist Church of Rockwell
- God's Tabernacle for Believers
- Grace Bible Church
- Grace Lowerstone Church
- Hillcreek Worship Center
- Immanuel Lutheran Church
- Living Large Ministries
- Lyerly Evangelical Church
- Ministries of Living Waters
- New Haven Baptist Church
- Organ Lutheran Church
- Rockwell Church of God
- Rockwell United Methodist
- St. James Lutheran
- St. Mathews Baptist Church
- Restoration Church
- Ursinus United Church of Christ
- West Park Baptist
