= Pratt Institute School of Information =

Information school of the Pratt Institute

Coordinates: 40.737930°N 73.998947°W

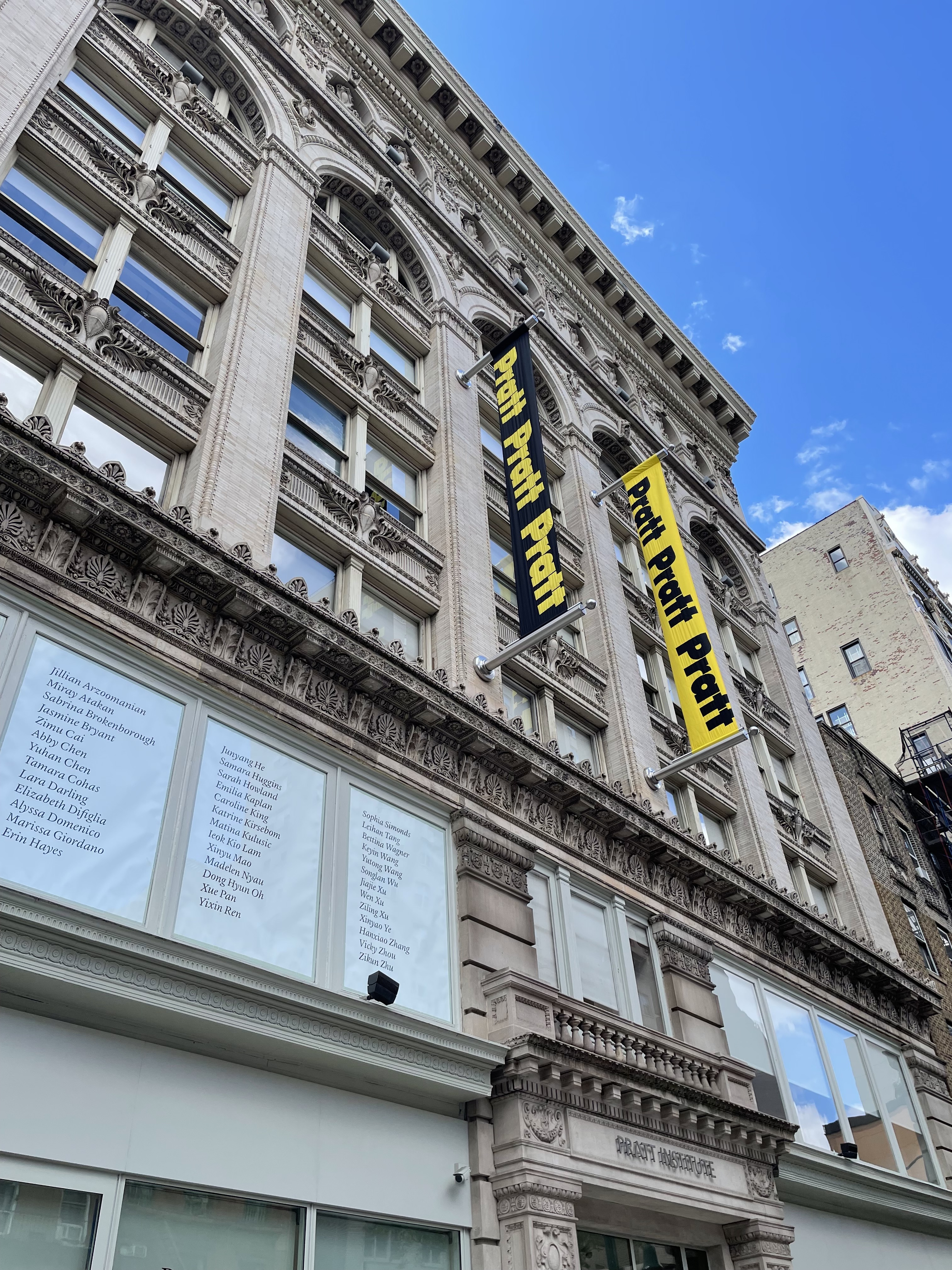
- Pratt Manhattan Center at 144 West 14th Street
- Type: Private information school
- Established: 1890
- Dean: Anthony Cocciolo
- Students: 424 students
- Location: New York City, New York, United States
- Campus: Urban
- Colors: Black, White and Yellow
- Website: pratt.edu/information
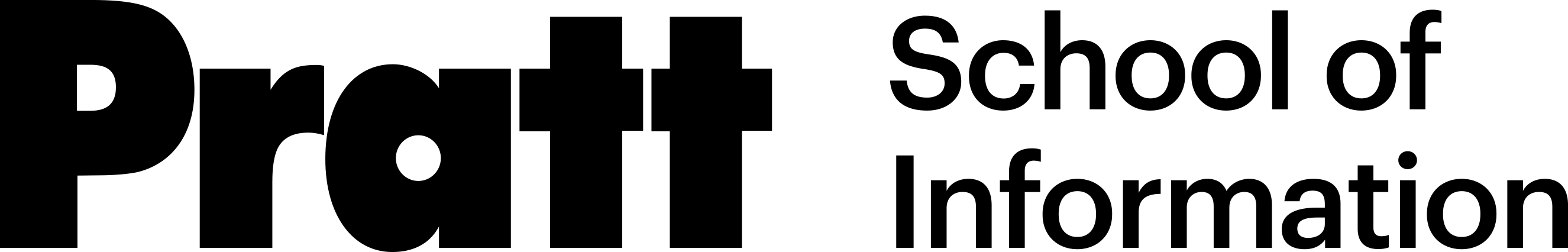

The Pratt Institute School of Information is the information school of the Pratt Institute, a private university in New York City.

The school administers the oldest Library and Information Science program in North America. It was created in Brooklyn, New York City, in 1890 shortly after Melvil Dewey created such a program at Columbia University in 1887. Based in Manhattan, the school administers the Master of Library and Information Science degree program that has been accredited by the American Library Association since the 1924–1925 academic year.

== History ==
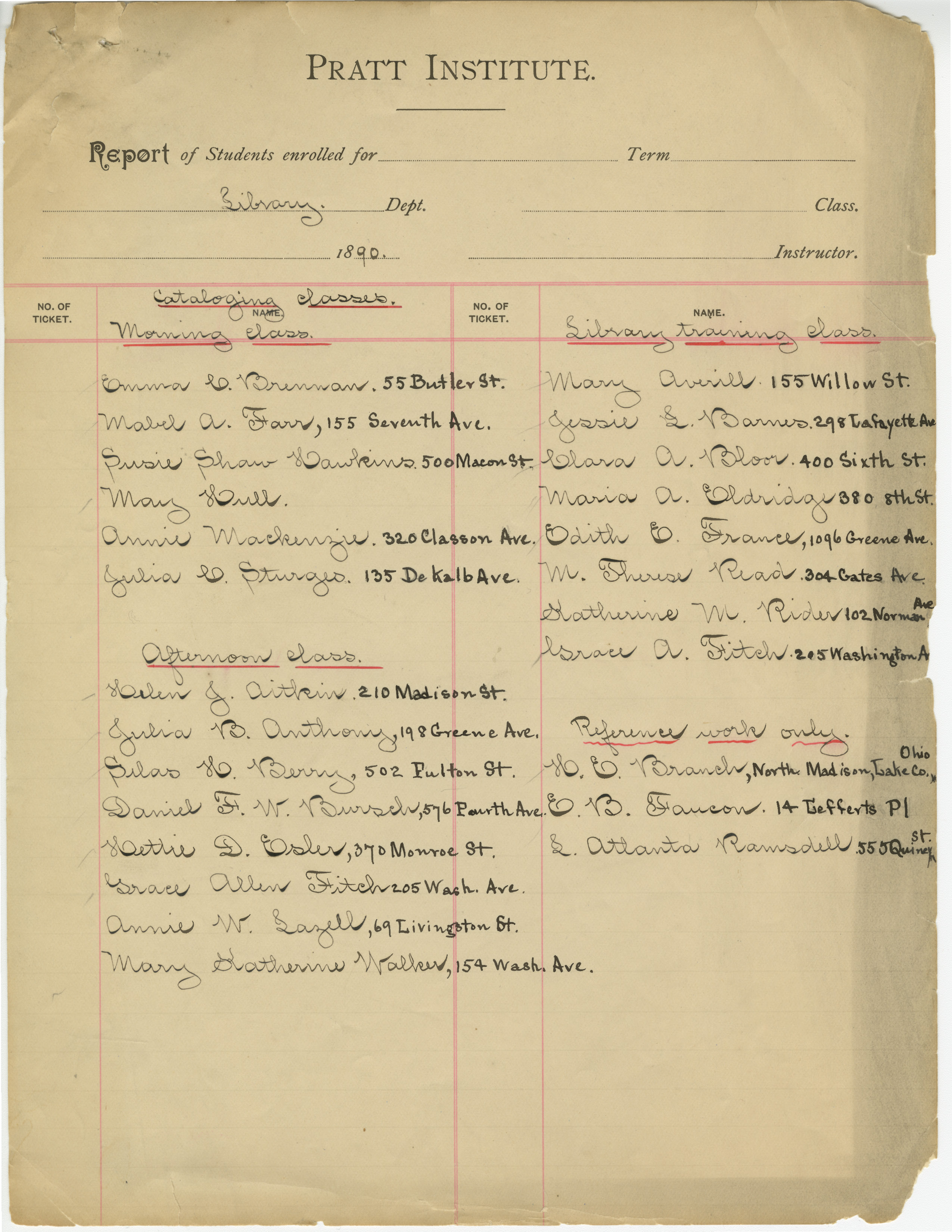
A listing of the students from 1890 enrolled in the morning and afternoon cataloging classes, as well as a list of students enrolled in the Library training class.

Charles Pratt, founder of Pratt Institute, recognized the need for a library that served both the faculty and students of the Institute as well as Brooklyn residents. He also recognized the need to have a facility for training of library staff. In June 1890, Pratt Institute offered courses in cataloging and library economics. In 1895, a regular faculty, chosen for its aptitude in teaching, was organized. Mary Wright Plummer, who was a graduate of Melvil Dewey’s class of 1888 from Columbia University, led it. In 1896, the Library School relocated to Pratt's new library building designed by William Tubby, which continues to act as Pratt Institute’s primary library.

Under Plummer's leadership, the school enacted a stiff entrance exam and exams in German and French. The entering class was consistently around 25 students. In 1911 when Plummer left to direct the Training School at New York Public Library, Josephine Adams Rathbone was appointed vice-director. Both Plummer and Rathbone were elected as presidents of the American Library Association.

Notable alumni from this early period include Anne Carroll Moore, who was a student of Mary Wright Plummer, and became a faculty member and the first children’s librarian at New York Public Library, serving in that position for 35 years (1906–1941). Another notable student from this period is Mary Elizabeth Wood, who promoted the development of libraries in China and established the first program in that country to train librarians.

In 1939, Pratt began to grant the degree of bachelor of science in library science and, in 1950, the master of library science degree. Notable figures from the twentieth century include Nasser Sharify, who worked to develop the field of international librarianship as dean and professor from 1968 to 1987. Soon after Nasser Sharify stepped into the role of Dean in 1968, the school’s name changed to the Graduate School of Library and Information Science (GSLIS). This would reflect the advances in technology and information science and Pratt’s embrace of these changes. “This action went far beyond a mere change in nomenclature,” Dean Sharify wrote in his 1978 history of the school. “Rather, the new designation gave recognition to an emerging and important new discipline [Information Science].”

Subsequent to the School's name change, the school rewrote its goals and objectives and began to expand its technology curriculum. In need of more space for computer labs, GSLIS moved from the library on the Brooklyn campus to its own building, the Information Science Center (ISC), in 1974. It included laboratories built for more hands-on technical computer study, including an instructional materials lab, an information science lab, and a technical processes lab.

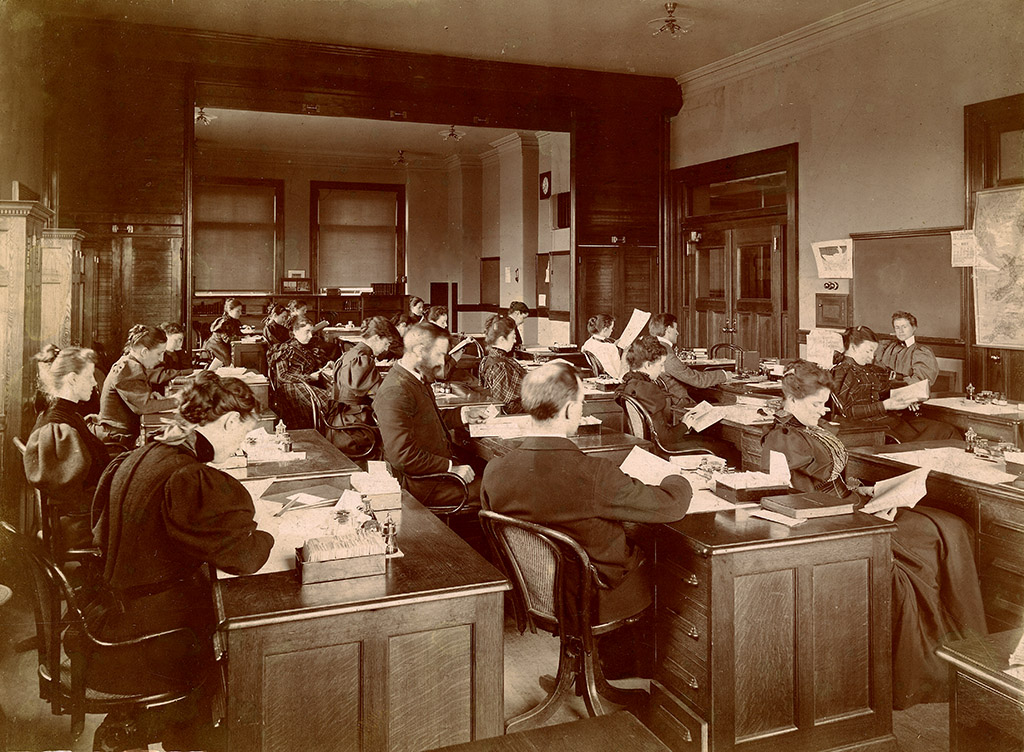
A class in the Pratt Institute Library School, 1897.

The school celebrated its centennial in 1990. In the United States House of Representatives, New York Congressman Major Owens (first librarian to serve in Congress) gave a salute to Pratt Institute's library school "both for its 100th anniversary, and for being the oldest such library program in the country."

Pratt Institute School of Information relocated to the Pratt Manhattan Center at the Puck Building 1996-2002. It relocated again in 200 to 144 West 14th Street in Manhattan, and it continues to operate from that location, which includes a branch of Pratt Institute Libraries. In 2004, Dean Tula Giannini repositioned the School to focus on archives and cultural heritage, introducing advanced certificate Programs in archives and museum libraries. In fall 2015, Dean Giannini, changed the name of the School from School of Information and Library Science (SILS) to School of Information (SI) as part of a strategic plan to transform the school for the 21st century digital age, which includes three new master degrees and advanced certificates (see below under "Academic programs").

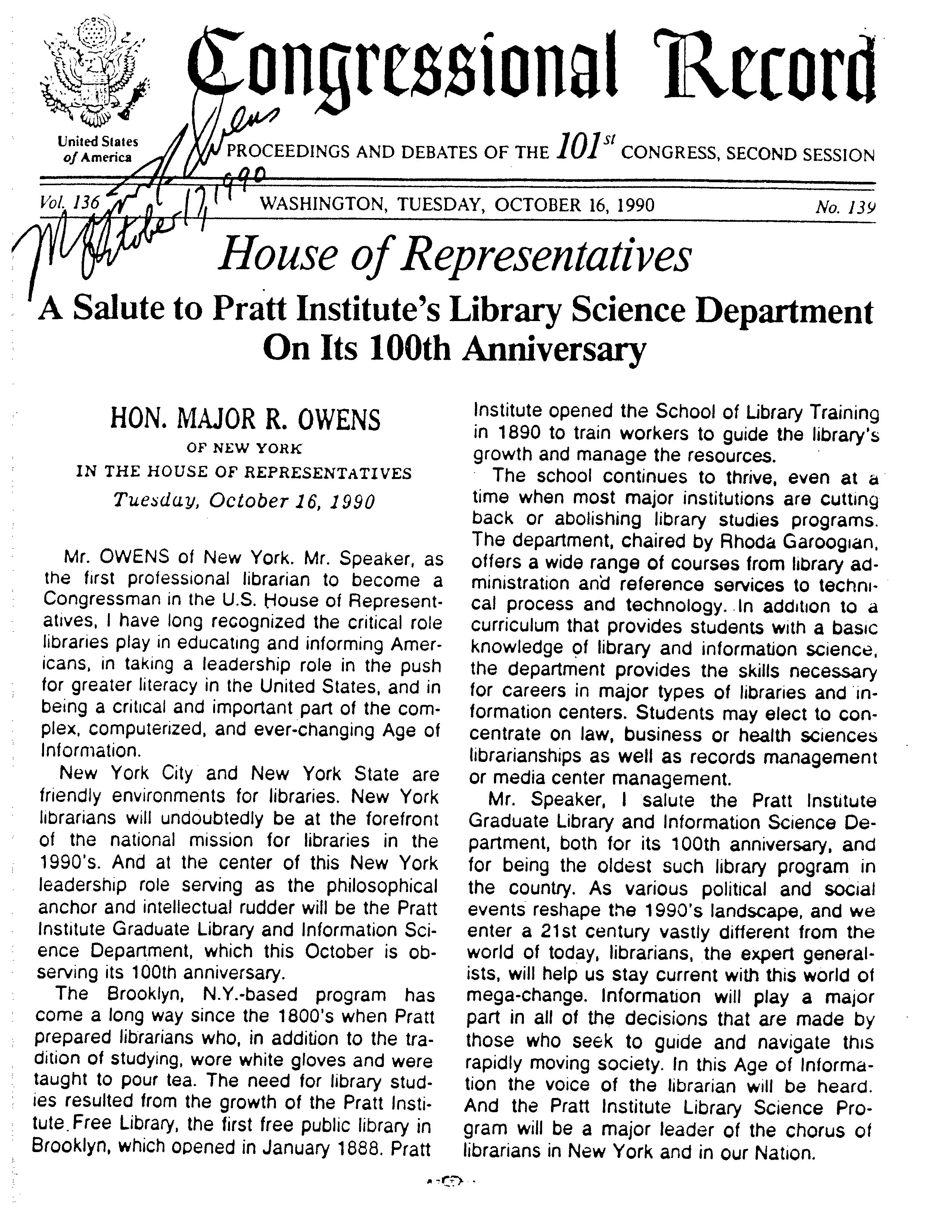
US Congressman Major Owens (first librarian to serve in Congress) gave a salute to Pratt Institute Library Science Department on its 100th Anniversary.

== Timeline ==
- 1890 – Pratt Institute begins offering courses in cataloging and library economics. Directed by Margaret Healy and ran from the basement of Pratt Institute's Main Building.
- 1895–1911 – Mary Wright Plummer directs the school.
- 1895 – A regular faculty is organized and is designated as Pratt Institute Library School.
- 1896 – Library school relocated to Pratt’s new library building designed by William Tubby.
- 1909 – School name changed to Pratt Institute School of Library Science.
- 1911–1938 – Josephine Adams Rathbone is vice director of the school, reporting to Edward F. Stevens (library director).
- 1924–1925 – The School is first accredited by the American Library Association
- 1938–1955 – William (Wayne) M. Shirley directorship/deanship.
- 1939 – Pratt offers the bachelor of science in library science.
- 1950 – Pratt offers the master of library science degree.
- 1955–1956 – Rice Estes acting deanship.
- 1956–1968 – Louis D. Sass deanship.
- 1968–1987 – Nasser Sharify deanship.
- 1968 – School renamed Graduate School of Library and Information Science (GSLIS)
- 1974 – The School relocates to the ISC Building (Information Science Center)
- 1987–1988 – S. Michael Malinconico deanship.
- 1987 – GSLIS merges with Computer Science program to become the School of Computer, Information, and Library Science (SCILS)
- 1988 – SCILS begins offering some classes in the Puck Building, which contained additional space for computer terminals.
- 1989 – SCILS dissolves, library program becomes department within School of Liberal Arts and Sciences. Rhoda Garoogian is department chair.
- 1991 – Library program restored as School of Information and Library Science
- 1991–1999 – Seoud M. Matta deanship (1991–1992 acting dean).
- 2000 – Larry Kroah acting deanship.
- 2000–2001 – Anne Woodsworth deanship.
- 2002 – School relocates to the Pratt Manhattan Center at 144 W. 14th St. in Manhattan.
- 2002–2004 – Marie Radford acting deanship.
- 2004–2017 – Tula Giannini deanship. (2004 acting dean)
- 2015 – The school offers more than one master's degree: the M.S. in Museums and Digital Culture; the school's name is changed from School of Information and Library Science to School of Information.
- 2016 – Pratt SI joins the iSchool organization. The school offers two new master's degrees: the M.S. in Information Experience Design and M.S. in Data Analytics and Visualization.
- 2017–current – Anthony Cocciolo deanship (2017–2018 interim dean).

== Academic programs ==
Pratt School of Information administers a Master of Science in Information and Library Science (MSLIS) degree accredited by the American Library Association; a M.S. in Museums and Digital Culture; a M.S. in Information Experience Design; a M.S. in Data Analytics and Visualization; and a MSLIS and M.S. History of Art dual degree program. Advanced certificate programs administered include an archives certificate, user experience (UX) certificate, children's and young adult library services certificate, digital humanities certificate, conservation and digital curation certificate, and spatial analysis and visualization certificate.

== Notable people ==
=== Alumni ===
- Sarah Byrd Askew—pioneered the establishment of county libraries in the United States
- Shirley Barker—American author, poet and librarian
- Constance Bement—President of Michigan Library Association, 1923-24.
- María Teresa Chávez Campomanes—Director of the Library of Mexico and Mexican librarian educator.
- Morris L. Cohen—Law librarian and professor of law
- Jacky Connolly-American Artist
- Eleanor Estes—American children's book author
- Ann Herendeen—American author of popular fiction
- Zoia Horn—first librarian ever to be jailed for refusing to divulge information that violated her belief in intellectual freedom
- Mary Frances Isom—promoted libraries in Oregon and was head librarian of the Library Association of Portland from 1902–1920.
- Romana Javitz—American artist, librarian, and Superintendent of the Picture Collection at the New York Public Library
- Daniel Lopatin—Electronic musician
- Herman H. B. Meyer—American Library Association president (1924–1925) and Chief Bibliographer at Library of Congress.
- Joan Millman—Former member of the New York State Assembly
- Mariame Kaba—Prison abolitionist, organizer, educator, archivist and curator
- Marvin H. Scilken—Advocate of practical customer-oriented librarianship and founding editor of the U*N*A*B*A*S*H*E*D Librarian, the how I run my library good letter.
- Carolyn F. Ulrich—Creator of Ulrich's Periodicals Directory
- Annette Persis Ward — writer, librarian at Alma College
- David Wellington—American horror author
- Margot Williams—Pulitzer prize-winning journalist and librarian
- Mary Elizabeth Wood—Promoted Western librarianship practices and programs in China

=== Library Journal Movers and Shakers ===
- 2003 Anne Coriston
- 2004 Mary Graham
- 2004 Suzan Lee
- 2004 Jerome Myers
- 2006 Kerwin Pilgrim
- 2006 Gary Shaffer
- 2007 Lisa Von Drasek
- 2009 Lia Friedman
- 2010 Gretchen Caserotti
- 2010 Stephanie Chase
- 2010 Lisa Chow
- 2010 Sandra Sajonas
- 2011 Tracey Crawford
- 2012 Davis Erin Anderson
- 2012 Nate Hill
- 2013 Dalia R. Levine
- 2014 Erin Shea
- 2017 Rebecca Pou
- 2017 Nicholas Higgins
- 2018 Jennifer Ferretti
- 2023 Robert Weinstein
- 2023 Rakisha Kearns-White
- 2024 Tomasz Kalata

=== Faculty ===
- Anne Carroll Moore—Also an alumna, she led the development of the field of children's librarianship
- Mary Wright Plummer—Head of the School and second female president of the American Library Association (1915–1916)
- Josephine Adams Rathbone—Head of the School and president of the American Library Association (1931–1932)
- Nasser Sharify—Dean Emeritus of the School and led the development of the field of international librarianship (d.2013)
- Rhoda Garoogian–Assistant Dean (1977–1989) of the School and chair of the department (1989–1991)
