= Annette Persis Ward =

American writer

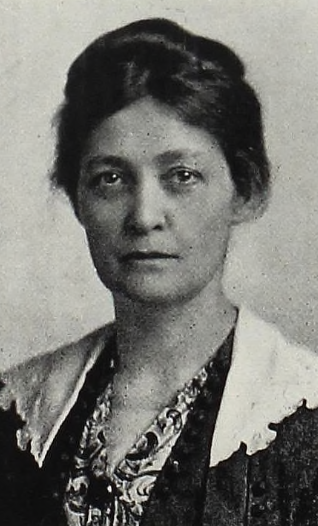
- Annette Persis Ward, from the 1927 yearbook of Alma College
- Born: October 16, 1873; Granville, Ohio
- Died: December 6, 1953 (aged 80); Zanesville, Ohio
- Occupations: Writer, college librarian

Annette Persis Ward (October 16, 1873 – December 6, 1953) was an American historian, writer, and college librarian. From 1919 to 1938, she was on the faculty at Alma College in Michigan, and the first woman to hold the rank of full professor there.

== Early life and education ==
Ward was born in Granville, Ohio, the daughter of Hudson Champlin Ward and Jane Elizabeth (Jennie) Parker Ward. Her father was born in England. Her mother's great-grandparents were Connecticut settlers in the Wyoming Valley during the 1770s, when jurisdiction over that region was a matter of dispute between Pennsylvania and Connecticut.

Ward attended Putnam Female Seminary. She earned a bachelor of science degree from Ohio State University, and a master's degree from the University of Michigan. She also attended Granville Female College, the New England Conservatory of Music, Oberlin College, and Pratt Institute Library School.

== Career ==
Ward was a librarian at the Woman's Institute of Yonkers and at the Western Reserve Historical Society in Cleveland in the 1900s, and at Alma College in Michigan from 1919 to 1938. She was the first woman to hold the rank of full professor at Alma College, where she taught library methods. She was active in the American Library Association and the American Association of University Women.

While living in Alma, she was president of the Alma Republican Women's Club, and assistant secretary of the Alma Chamber of Commerce.

In 1898, she witnessed the Good Friday rituals of the Penitentes in New Mexico.

== Publications ==
- Annotated list of the works of Thomas Bailey Aldrich (1907)
- Lest We Forget: Oliver Hazard Perry, the War of 1812, the Battle of Lake Erie (1912)
- "List of Abbey's Illustrations of Shakespeare's Comedies" (1922)
- "The Effect Upon a Student's College Work of His High School Instruction in Library Use, or the Lack of It" (1928)
- "A Few Pages from my Great-Grandmother's Diary" (1931)
- "A Memorial to Jane Elizabeth Parker Ward (Mrs. Hudson Champlin Ward) 1833-1914" (1947, unfinished)

== Personal life ==
Ward died in 1953, at the age of 80, in Zanesville, Ohio.
