= Nasser Sharify =

Nasser Sharify (September 23, 1925 – August 23, 2013) was a library and information scientist born in Tehran, Iran. Since 1987, he served as a Distinguished Professor and Dean Emeritus of Pratt Institute, School of Information and Library Science in New York City.

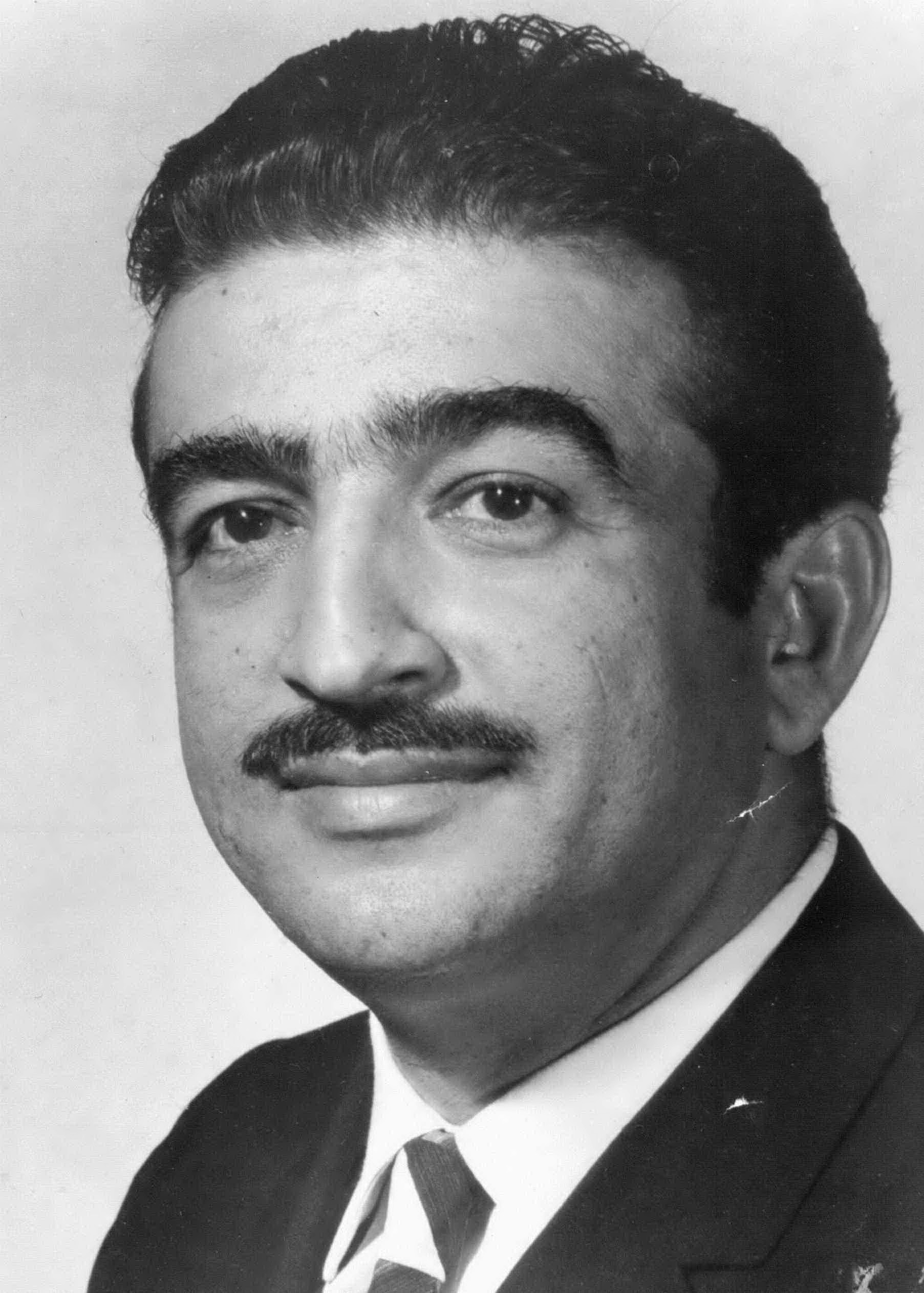
Sharify in 1960s

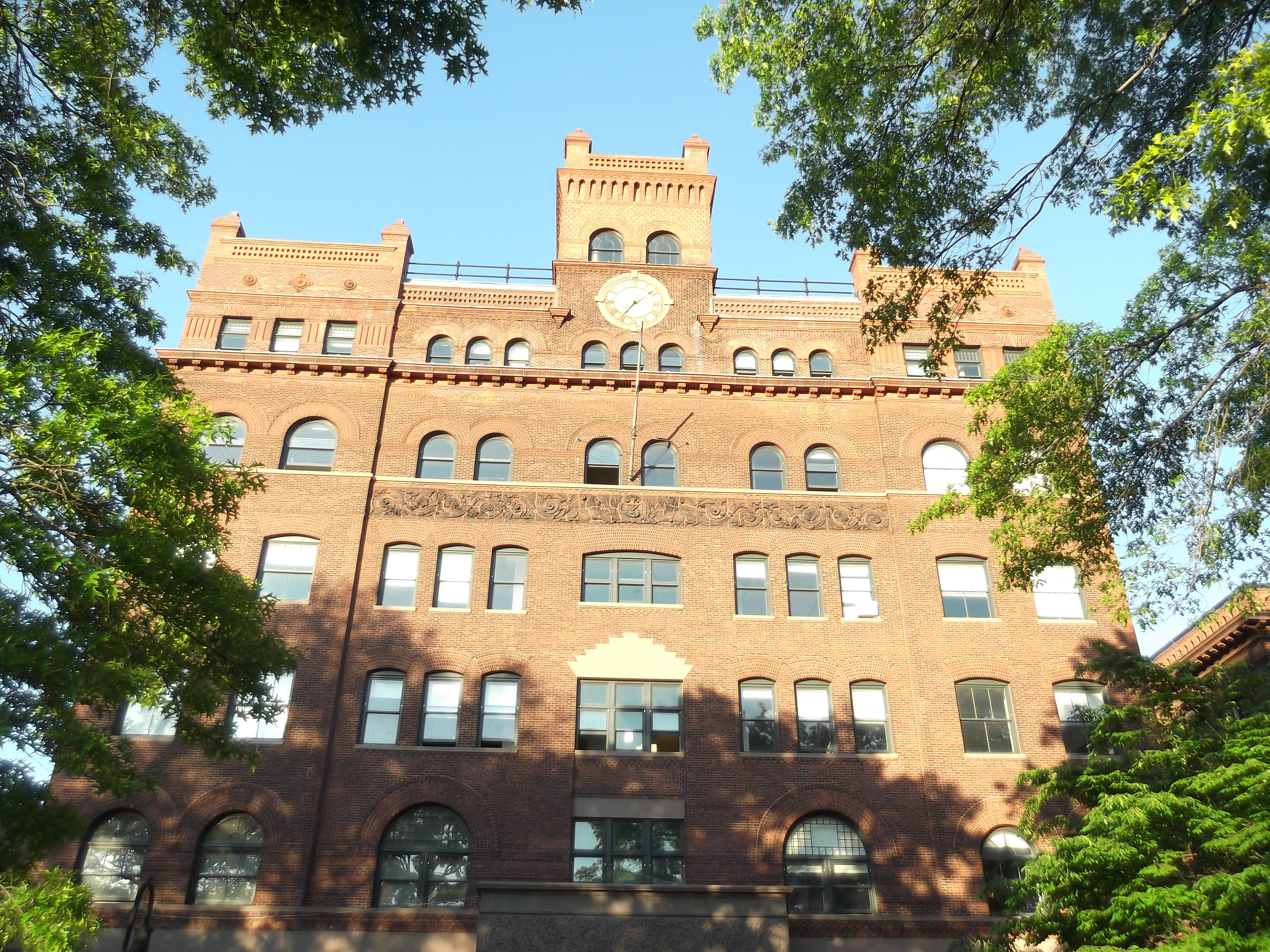
The main building at the Pratt Institute campus in Brooklyn, New York, USA.

== Education ==
D.L.S Columbia University, School of Library Service, 1958
M.S. Columbia University, School of Library Service, 1954
B.A Tehran University, French Literature, 1947

== Contributions in the U.S. and Abroad ==
From 1962 to 1963 he served as Acting Chief, (Programme Specialist) Education Information and Materials Section, UNESCO Division of Education, Information, and Materials in Paris, France. He was the Founder of the International Library Information Center, University of Pittsburgh in 1964. He remained on as Director of the International Library Information Center from 1964 to 1966.

From Pittsburgh, Dr. Sharify moved on to the State University of New York (SUNY) where he headed the office of International Librarianship, Learning Resources, and Information Services (ILLRIS) in 1966. This office, created to provide information services for teaching, research and public service programs for International Studies and World Affairs for the entire SUNY system.

From 1968 to 1987 he was Dean and Professor at Pratt Institute, Graduate School of Library and Information Science, Brooklyn, NY. Under Sharify, the school began to integrate new curricula in Information Science into its library program and focus on burgeoning library technologies.

As the chairman of the Board of Consultants for the Pahlavi National Library, he was responsible for coordinating over 40 international librarians and professionals in order to prepare a 17-volume position paper to be presented to the Shah of Iran in March 1975. The Pahlavi National Library was part of the Shah's vision to educate the Iranian people.

Since 1987, he was Distinguished Professor and Dean Emeritus of Pratt Institute, School of Information and Library Science in New York City. In 1988, Pratt established the Nasser Sharify Lecture Series, created to honor Dean Sharify's 40 years of contribution to library and information science.

As a UNESCO consultant, he designed and helped create Morocco's first school of information science in 1973.

The Hoover Institution at Stanford University established the Nasser Sharify Archives of works on and about him, and works written by him, including his literary works, poetry and speeches.

In 2004, the Nasser Sharify Foundation was formed "to promote scholarship, education, and research in the fields of Information & Library Sciences, literary achievement in the Persian and English languages, and public awareness in multicultural issues."

In 2012 A BELT around the World: A World Building on Education, Lifelong Learning, and Technology: A Festschrift Honoring Nasser Sharify was published in his honor.

== Awards ==
The Kaula Gold Medal, 1985 - Given annually to only one international leader or scholar in the world.

The Shah's Crown Medal, 1977 - He presented his master plan for a national network of information in Iran to the Shah of Iran, and it earned him the distinguished Shah's Crown Medal.

American Library Association (ALA) Citation, June 1999 - the ALA presented this award honoring Nasser Sharify for his lifelong contributions to Library Sciences.

== Organizations ==
ALA Nominating Committee, 1970–71
International Education Committee, Middle East Research Panel, 1969 AALS Nominating Committee, 1977–79
