= Grace Evangelical and Reformed Church =

Historic church in North Carolina, United States

- Grace Lower Stone Evangelical and Reformed Church
- U.S. National Register of Historic Places
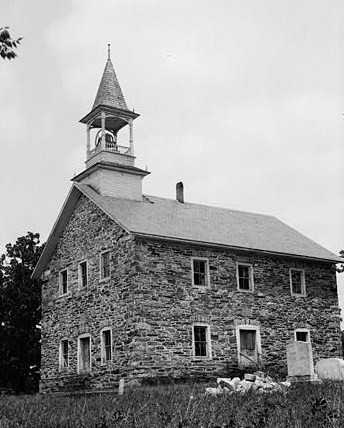

- Location within North Carolina Location within the United States
- Location: S of Rockwell on SR 1221, near Rockwell, North Carolina
- Coordinates: 35°31′15″N 80°25′17″W
- Area: 1 acre (0.40 ha)
- Built: 1795
- Architectural style: Georgian
- NRHP reference No.: 72000990
- Added to NRHP: January 20, 1972

Grace Church (traditionally known as Lower Stone Church because of the building's topographical position in relation to Organ Church) is one of the oldest churches in North Carolina, having been organized about 1745 as a Reformed congregation. The current church building dates from 1795. The congregation is currently affiliated with the Evangelical Association and is served by interim pastor, Rev. Kevin Sloop.

== History ==
Grace Church began with the influx of German settlers into Piedmont North Carolina mostly from Pennsylvania during the 1740s and 50s. Many of the Germans were of the Lutheran persuasion, but the settlers who began Grace Church were of the Reformed tradition and were called the Calvin or "Presbyterian Congregation on Second Creek in the Dutch Settlement." An earlier wooden structure commonly known as the "Hickory Church" (circa mid-1750s) was shared with Organ Zion Lutheran Church on the plantation of Jacob Fulenwiler, the current site of St. Peter's Lutheran Church. When Fulenwiler died in 1771, both churches moved to Grace Church's current location, with Organ Church moving to its own site in 1774. Construction on the present Grace Church building began sometime after Organ Church started work on their building in 1792 and was completed in 1795.

The earliest documented evidence of the location of a "Meeting House" on Grace's present property is a deed on record in the Rowan County Court House dated February, 1774, by which Lorentz Lingel conveyed sixteen acres of a larger land grant (dated 1761) from the Earl of Granville to Andrew Holtshouser (Holshouser) and John Lippard "for the use of the Calvin congregation adjacent or belonging to the Meeting House on the following land..." The land described is that on which the present Grace Lower Stone Church is located, and the deed indicates beyond question that a log "meeting house" had been built on this land prior to February, 1774. The church is built of local granite with a 12-foot gable roof. The dimensions of the church are 51 feet long and 40 feet 9 inches wide. The walls are 27 feet high and massive in width, measuring 32 inches thick at ground level, 27 inches thick at floor level, and 21 inches thick at gallery level. Grace Lower Stone Reformed Church and Organ Lutheran Church, which had their origins together, are nearly the same size and are built of the same type of rock and on the same general architectural plan. "The floor of the church originally was on the ground level and was laid of smooth stones, which remained in place until 1871, when the present floor was installed. The original seats were wooden benches without backs. The pulpit was of the wine glass design, mounted on a pedestal, with steps leading to it, and with an overhead sounding board. It was used until 1876, when during the pastorate of the Rev. R. F. Crooks, a new pulpit and altar pieces were made by members of the congregation. There were galleries on three sides, which provided additional seating space, until 1937, when alterations were made to provide classrooms for the Sunday School." The partitions have since been removed, and the galleries look as they might have in an earlier time. Over the north, south, and west doorways are stone tablets with inscriptions written in German. On the south wall is a smaller inset tablet with a clock face and a German inscription reading: "In the year of Christ, 1795: with God's help" indicating the date the walls were finished. In a church document written in 1798, we find the following statement regarding the name of the church. "This house shall be called Gnaden Kirch (Grace Church) because the eternal life and the means of grace for the same, are gifts from God, through our Lord Jesus Christ."

Although the church was early completed (exact date unknown), it was not dedicated until November, 1811, during the pastorate of the Rev. George Boger. The Rev. Andrew Loretz preached the sermon, and the Rev. Dr. John Robinson, pastor of Poplar Trent Presbyterian Church, was present and took part in the service. The church is of Georgian colonial architecture typical of similar stone structures in Pennsylvania. The somewhat plain, whitewashed interior is indicative of the Reformed tradition. In 1901, a bell tower was added to the roof of the church. Grace Church is listed on the National Register of Historic Places.

The church is in a pastoral setting surrounded by many graves in the old churchyard. In the graveyard are buried some of the earliest families in Rowan County with stones bearing the names Barringer, Beaver, Berger, Boger, Bost, Brown, Casper, Corl, Fisher, Foil, Holshouser, Isenhower, Klutts, Kluttz, Klutz, Lingle, Lippard, Lyerly, Miller, Misenheimer, Moose, Peeler, Rinehart, Roseman, Shuping, Trexler, Troutman, Weaver, and Yost may be found throughout the cemetery. Many descendants of these early settlers continue as members of the congregation. Grace Lower Stone Church has been the mother church for the formation of other Reformed churches in the area. Throughout its long history, many of members who grew up in the church have gone into the service of the larger Church and community. Grace Church became a full member of the United Church of Christ, formed in 1957 by the merger of the Evangelical and Reformed Church with the Congregational Christian Church. However, in 2005, due to a conflict over doctrine, Grace pulled out of the United Church of Christ, moving closer to the earlier Reformed tradition.
