= Margot Williams =

American investigative journalist

- Occupations: Investigative journalist, research editor
- Known for: Member of a team that won a Pulitzer Prize in 2002

Margot Williams is an American investigative journalist and research editor, currently serving as the Research Editor for Investigations at The Intercept. Throughout her career, she has worked at The Washington Post, The New York Times, NPR, and the International Consortium of Investigative Journalists (ICIJ).

She was part of teams at the Washington Post that won two Pulitzer Prizes. In 1998, she was part of a team that won the Pulitzer Gold Medal for public service for reporting on the high rate of police shootings in Washington, D.C. In 2002, she was part of a team that won the Pulitzer Prize for National Reporting for its coverage of the war on terror.

== Education ==
| Degree | Institution | Field |
| | High School of Performing Arts | dancer and actress |
| B.A. | CCNY | Asian Studies |
| M.S. | Pratt Institute School of Information and Library Science | Library and Information Science |

== Acting career ==
Williams worked as a dancer and as an actress prior to finishing her academic career.

== Career in journalism ==
Early in her career, Williams worked as the Library Director at the Poughkeepsie Journal.

In 1990, Williams joined the Washington Post. While there, she was one of the contributors to the "Networkings" column.

In 2004, Williams joined The New York Times. While there, she spearheaded the paper's publication of a searchable database of 16,000 pages of documents produced by the Office for the Administrative Review of Detained Enemy Combatants. The Times introduced its "Guantanamo Dockets" on November 3, 2008. The dockets are based on the personal notes Williams had started to compile as she read all 16,000 pages concerning the detainees at Guantanamo Bay.

In 2010, Williams left The New York Times and joined National Public Radio as a correspondent.

== Author ==
In 1981, Williams wrote a book titled Cuba from Columbus to Castro. In 1999, she wrote a book, Great Scouts: CyberGuides for Subject Searching on the Web.

== Awards ==
| year | award | institution |
|---|---|---|
| 1998 | Gold Medal for public service | Pulitzer |
| 1999 | Local or State Government Coverage | Associated Press |
| 2002 | National Reporting | Pulitzer |
| 2004 | Sports Editors Awards category of explanatory reporting for newspapers over 250,000 circulation | Associated Press |
| 2005 | International News Reporting Grand Prize | Annual Front Page Guild Service Awards |
