= Shirley Barker =

American author, poet, and librarian

- Born: Shirley Frances Barker; April 4, 1911; Farmington, New Hampshire, U.S.
- Died: November 18, 1965 (aged 54); Penacook, New Hampshire, U.S.
- Education: Radcliffe College, Pratt Institute School of Information and Library Science
- Occupations: Poet; author; librarian

Shirley Frances Barker (April 4, 1911 – November 18, 1965) was an American writer, poet, and librarian.

== Biography ==
Barker was born in Farmington, New Hampshire. She attended the University of New Hampshire, graduating with a B.A. in 1934 as a member of Phi Beta Kappa. While still an undergraduate, she won the Yale Series of Younger Poets Competition with her poetry collection The Dark Hills Under (1933). It was published with a foreword by Stephen Vincent Benét and was well reviewed.

One of the judges had detected some literary affinities between her work and that of Robert Frost, so UNH President Edward M. Lewis asked Barker to send a copy of the collection to Frost, Lewis' friend and correspondent. Frost was enraged by what he perceived as anti-Puritan and anti-theistic sentiments in Barker's poetry and bizarrely insisted that Barker was the illegitimate descendant of a person described in her poem "Portrait". In what his biographer described as "a characteristic act of poetic retaliation", Frost penned the ribald poem "Pride of Ancestry" and the religious poem "Not All There". He did not tell Lewis of his objections to Barker's work and there is no record that there was any correspondence between Frost and Barker.

Barker did not publish another book for sixteen years. She graduated with an A.M. in English from Radcliffe College in 1938 and a degree in library science from the Pratt Institute School of Information and Library Science in 1941. Beginning in 1940, she worked as a librarian at the New York Public Library, primarily in the American history section.

In 1949, she published her debut novel, Peace My Daughters, about the Salem witch trials, which she believed her ancestors had attended. She wrote a series of successful formula historical novels, most of them set in her native New England and some with supernatural elements. Two of her novels, Rivers Parting (1952) and Swear by Apollo (1959), were Literary Guild selections. The success of these novels enabled her to leave the New York Public Library in 1953 and she moved to Concord, New Hampshire.

Barker was found inside a car in her garage in Penacook, New Hampshire, dead of carbon monoxide poisoning. The car windows were up and the gas tank was empty. Her death was ruled a suicide. When Frost biographer Lawrance Thompson attempted to access her papers, he was told by her executor that they all "had disappeared under mysterious circumstances". However, typescripts, galleys, and plate proofs of the novels Liza Bowe, Swear by Apollo, and The Last Gentleman are in the University of New Hampshire Library.

== Selected works ==
- The Dark Hills Under (poems), Yale University Press (New Haven, CT), 1933.
- Peace, My Daughters, Crown (New York, NY), 1949.
- Rivers Parting, Crown, 1950.
- A Land and a People (poems), Crown, 1952.
- Fire and Hammer, Crown, 1953.
- Tomorrow the New Moon, Bobbs (New York, NY), 1955.
- Liza Bowe, Random (New York, NY), 1956.
- Swear by Apollo, Random, 1958.
- The Trojan Horse, Random, 1959.
- The Last Gentleman, Random, 1960.
- Corner of the Moon, Crown, 1961.
- The Road to Bunker Hill, Duell, Sloan & Pearce (New York, NY), 1962.
- Strange Wives, Crown, 1963.
