= Zion Lutheran Church (Rockwell, North Carolina) =

Historic church in North Carolina, United States

- U.S. National Register of Historic Places
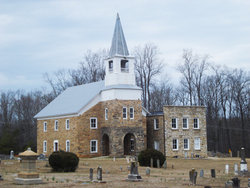

- Location within North Carolina Location within the United States
- Location: SW of Rockwell on SR 1006 off SR 1221, near Rockwell, North Carolina
- Coordinates: 35°31′40″N 80°27′0″W
- Area: 3 acres (1.2 ha)
- Built: 1794
- NRHP reference No.: 72000991
- Added to NRHP: January 20, 1972

Zion Lutheran Church, also known as Organ Church, is a historic Lutheran church located near Rockwell, Rowan County, North Carolina. It was completed in 1794, and is a two-story, stone building. A large bell tower was added about 1900; it is topped by a heavy octagonal spire with a weathervane. A Sunday School addition was built on the rear of the church in 1929.

An earlier wooden structure commonly known as the "Hickory Church" (circa mid-1750s) was shared with Grace Church on the plantation of Jacob Fulenwiler, the current site of St. Peter's Lutheran Church. When Fulenwiler died in 1771, both churches moved to Grace Church's current location, with Organ Church moving to its own site in 1774.

Organ Church was added to the National Register of Historic Places in 1972.
