= Ruth French Carnovsky =

American classical philologist and librarian (1906–2003)

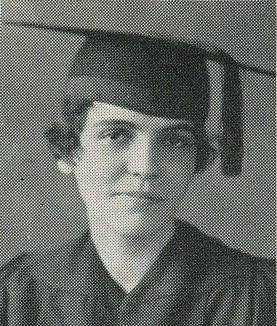
- Born: Ruth Calista French; August 11, 1906; Chippewa Falls, Wisconsin
- Died: November 11, 2003 (aged 97); Oakland, California
- Spouse(s): Donald Everett Strout (m. 1935; div. 1953) Leon Carnovsky (m. 1967; died 1975)
- Relatives: Melville French (brother); Robert French (brother)

Ruth French Carnovsky (born Ruth Calista French, later Strout; August 11, 1906 – November 11, 2003) was an American educator, classical philologist, and librarian.

== Early life and education ==
Ruth and her family moved from Chippewa Falls, Wisconsin, to De Pere, Wisconsin, shortly after her birth. In 1928, she went on to receive a Bachelor of Arts degree in Latin from Carroll College in Waukesha, Wisconsin. She then began studying Greek and Classical Archaeology at Yale University. In 1935, she earned her Ph.D. in Classics from the University of Illinois Chicago. She later received a B.S. in Library Science from the University of Minnesota in 1945.

== Career ==
After receiving her B.A., she began teaching Latin and Humanities at Iberia Junior College in Iberia, Missouri. She later worked as an art librarian at the Minneapolis Public Library from 1945 to 1948. From 1949 to 1953, she served as an associate professor at the University of Denver's School of Librarianship, teaching courses in cataloging and classification. This was followed by a year as a visiting professor at Keio University in Tokyo (1953–1954). Ruth then began teaching at the University of Chicago's Graduate Library School (GLS) from 1954 to 1971, serving as the GLS dean during the 1960's. She ultimately retired as a professor emeritus.

== Personal life ==
She married her first husband, Donald Everett Strout, on January 1, 1935, whom she divorced in 1953. She later married Leon Carnovsky in 1967, whom she stayed married to until his death in 1975.

== Death and legacy ==
Ruth Carnovsky died on November 11, 2003 in Oakland, California.

== Works ==
- 1. (French) Strout RC. The greek versions of jerome's vita sancti hilarionis. [Order No. 30405298]. University of Illinois at Urbana-Champaign; 1935.
- Carnovsky, R. French., University of Chicago. Graduate Library School. Conference. 1956). (1957). Toward a better cataloging code. [Chicago]: University of Chicago, Graduate Library School.
- University of Chicago. University Extension Division. Home Study Dept., Strout, R. Calista French. (1956). Organization of library materials: Library Science 201. Chicago: University of Chicago, Home-Study Dept..
