= Dorothy Shea (librarian) =

Australian librarian

Dorothy Shea (25 April 1941 – 5 January 2024) was an Australian librarian who was the Librarian of the Supreme Court of Tasmania from 1988 to 2016, president of the Australian Law Librarians' Association (ALLA) from 2004 to 2005, and the editor of the organisation's journal Australian Law Librarian from 2008 to 2012. She notably discovered and helped to preserve a large amount of original Tasmanian legislation.

== Early life and education ==
Shea was born in Queensland and grew up on a farm on the bank of the Condamine River before moving to Toowoomba at age 16 to work for Southern Cross Windmills. After three years, she moved to Perth to start university.

== Career ==
At first, Shea worked as a teacher but said that "[i]t was not a success, either for the children or for me". She became a librarian at the Western Australian Institute of Technology (WAIT), working at the old Perth Boys' School on St Georges Terrace. Shea was the subject librarian for engineering, architecture and home economics students.

After taking a career break to have children, Shea began studying for a graduate diploma in library studies at WAIT in 1979. After graduating, she became the librarian for Hammersley Iron where she organised and managed the company library after it had been moved from Melbourne to Perth.

In 1981, Shea and her husband "decided ... that the heat in WA [Western Australia] was too much for us", and Shea found a job as the librarian and projects officer at the Advisory Council for Intergovernment Relations in Hobart, Tasmania. In 1986, the Council was abolished, later becoming the Council of Australian Governments. Shea then worked at John Fisher College before being employed as the librarian at the Supreme Court of Tasmania in 1988. The job was initially classed as a casual part-time role meaning Shea had to have all of her hours signed off by the organisation's accountant; after two years, Shea's role was made permanent and, three years after that, it was made a full-time post.

Her role included providing a law library for judges, magistrates and court staff in Tasmania, as well as adapting the library to newer, digital resources. Shea helped to digitise the Tasmanian Law Reports and in 1993, established the first database of unreported judgements for the court.

Shea was the president of the Australian Law Librarians' Association between 2004 and 2005. In 2008, Shea was appointed editor of the Australian Law Librarian, the journal of the ALLA. She remained editor until 2012.

During her work at the Supreme Court, she discovered a large collection of original Tasmanian legislation which she found while "searching for a piece of transcript". The recovered legislation spanned from 1833 to 1975 and some were written on vellum. Recognising their importance, Shea led the project which restored and properly archived the documents, which were later relocated to the Tasmanian Archive and Heritage Office.

Shea continued to work on the project after she left her role at the Supreme Court in 2016; in a 2019 interview, she said "I either resigned or retired, depending on how I feel about describing it". Shea died on 5 January 2024; the Tasmanian legislation project was finished shortly after her death.
