= Rhoda Garoogian =

- Born: 1933
- Died: 1998
- Occupation(s): Librarian, Author
- Known for: Assistant and Acting Dean of Pratt Institute School of Information and Library Science

Rhoda Garoogian (1933–1998) was an American author and librarian who served as the Assistant Dean of the Pratt Institute School of Information and Library Science beginning in 1977, and Acting Dean from 1989 to 1991. Much of her scholarship was in the field of education for librarians and practices of library use, and she also co-authored a series of city ranking guides with her husband, Andrew Garoogian.

== Education and career ==
Garoogian obtained her Master of Library and Information Science from Pratt Institute in 1973. She worked as an adjunct reference librarian at Brooklyn College and a visiting instructor at Pratt before being appointed the Assistant Dean of the Library School in 1977. She served in this position until 1989, when she was promoted to Acting Dean.

Throughout her career, she wrote about the information practices of libraries and librarians, as well as about the future of library school education. In 1980, she published an article in the Wilson Library Bulletin about the practices of the Pratt School of Library and Information Science, and about the future of the program. She discussed the importance of technology skills for librarians, highlighting the divergence between librarianship and information science.

When Garoogian became Acting Dean in 1989, enrollment at the school had dropped to below 100 students, and in 1990, the school was downgraded to the Graduate Library and Information Science Department. During Garoogian's tenure as dean, enrollment was doubled, and the program was reinstated as a school.

== Publications ==
- The library technical assistant (Graduate School of Library and Information Science, Pratt Institute, 1975)
- Library Use of the New York Times Information Bank: A Preliminary Survey (Reference & User Services Quarterly, 1976)
- Inside our schools (Wilson Library Bulletin, 1980)
- AIDS, 1981-1983 : an annotated bibliography (CompuBibs, 1984)
- Careers in other fields for librarians : successful strategies for finding the job (American Library Association, 1985)
- America's top rated cities : a statistical handbook (Universal Reference Publications, 1992) Garoogian and her husband published seven books in this series.
