= Marvin H. Scilken =

American librarian

- Born: Marvin Herman Scilken; December 7, 1926; Bronx, New York, U.S.
- Died: February 2, 1999 (aged 72); Philadelphia, Pennsylvania, U.S.
- Education: University of Colorado-Boulder Pratt Institute School of Information and Library Science
- Occupation: librarian
- Known for: the U*N*A*B*A*S*H*E*D Librarian Journal

Marvin Herman Scilken (December 7, 1926 – February 2, 1999) was an American librarian and a leader in the field of library science during the 20th century. Scilken dedicated his life to bringing awareness to libraries and improving services for patrons. He encouraged libraries to take a more practical approach to librarianship and to consider libraries as a house of books rather than information centers. In 1999, American Libraries named him one of the "100 Most Important Leaders We Had in the 20th Century".

== Early life and career ==
Marvin Scilken was born and raised in the Bronx, New York. His parents were Russian immigrants Joseph Scilken and Esther Scilken and he had one sister Marjorie. Scilken attended his local high school, Bronx High School of Science, and then continued his education at the University of Colorado-Boulder where he earned bachelor's degrees in Economics and Philosophy.

When he graduated in 1948, he had not yet considered pursuing a career in library science. It was not until 1960 that library science piqued his interest. Scilken was originally interested in pursuing his master's degree in Library Science degree at Columbia University. However, upon applying to Columbia's program, he was asked for an essay on why he was interested in becoming a librarian and, as Scilken said, “I dawdled so much that time ran out and I failed to get in” As a result, he entered and graduated from Pratt Institute's School of Information and Library Science in Brooklyn instead.

Scilken's career in library science began quickly. In 1964, only a few years after his graduation, he received a directorship at Orange Public Library in New Jersey where he remained until his retirement in 1993. Scilken served five consecutive terms on the American Library Association (ALA) Council, was a prolific writer of letters to the editor, founded his own practical library journal the U*N*A*B*A*S*H*E*D Librarian, and achieved early fame for stopping the price fixing of library books.

Scilken died February 2, 1999, from a heart-attack while attending that year's American Library Association midwinter meeting.

== Contributions to Library Science ==
=== Advocacy through Newspapers ===
Scilken's passion for reading the New York Times led him to use newspapers as one of his largest platforms for library advocacy. He would write a letter to the editor for every newspaper he came across. Through these letters, Scilken sought to get people excited about their local libraries and encouraged libraries to better serve their patrons. Scilken's letters were featured in large nationwide publications including Texas Highways, American Airlines, Smithsonian, and Newsweek. Although he wrote letters to papers across the country, many he wrote to his hometown paper the New York Times.

=== The U*N*A*B*A*S*H*E*D Librarian ===
Scilken's advocacy through writing would later inspire him to create his own publication the U*N*A*B*A*S*H*E*D Librarian, the how I run my library good letter. Choosing topics that focused on the practical parts of librarianship, the publication featured a collection of articles, cartoons, letters, and advice all dealing with the world of libraries. Advice was given on how to better improve library services including an assortment of topics from more traditional cataloguing techniques to more practical cleaning techniques.

The quarterly publication was started in 1971 and quickly became a family affair. His wife, Polly, assisted with the editing and publishing and her brother came up with the title and design. Her brother had been working as a designer at Harper and Row a publishing house that had printed Leo Rosten's novel The Education of H*Y*M*A*N* K*A*P*L*A*N*.

When Scilken died in 1999 Maurice J. Freedman assumed editorship. In 2021 Freedman suspended publication as noted in his final editorial, "This Is the Very Last Issue of The U*N*A*B*A*S*H*E*D™ Librarian."

=== 1966 Senate Hearing on the Price Fixing of Library Books ===
Besides his writings, he is perhaps best remembered for his appearance before the U.S. Senate's Subcommittee on Antitrust and Monopoly. Although a new librarian at the time, Scilken discovered that publishers were charging the same price per a book no matter how many were purchased. He was infuriated that libraries were being forced to pay more while at the same time publishers were offering discounts to booksellers buying multiple copies. Unable to negotiate with the publishers, Scilken wrote letters to the Federal Trade Commission and to state and local politicians. The only responses came from New Jersey Senator Clifford Case and Senator Philip Hart, who was involved with the senate subcommittee. After indictments of a few publishing houses, a senatorial hearing was held. In the spring of 1966, publishers, Scilken, business men, and other librarians appeared before the subcommittee to give their testimony. In the end, it was found that publishers were in fact price fixing. Although not well covered by the press at the time, it changed the way libraries did business with publishers.

Over $10 million was returned to libraries after various lawsuits stemming from the hearings.

== Views on Contemporary Library Science ==
=== On Serving the Patron ===
Unlike most librarians, Scilken always chose to refer to patrons as customers and often said that his motto is “The customer is king.” Libraries, according to Scilken, need to be aware of who their patrons are. He often encouraged public libraries to buy all of the bestsellers and not concern themselves with purchasing books that would generally only be found and used in academic libraries.

Scilken also encouraged libraries to employ ways which would foster the library customer's curiosity and browsing experience. For example, he encouraged customers of his public library to leave notes in books as to whether they enjoyed it or not. This would aid other customers in their decision as to whether they should check-out the book. He felt that browsing was an important part of the library experience. He said, “Half the fun in a library is falling across the unexpected.”

=== On Library Science and Technology ===
One of Scilken's great concerns was that libraries are forgetting their roots and their identities. It worried him that librarians are changing their identity in order to seem current with technology. He had become concerned that libraries and librarians are too quickly adopting any new fad or technology. Overall, he was disappointed that libraries are now considering themselves information centers. He encouraged libraries to return to their focus on books and often “[told his] colleagues that [libraries] are in the book business, not the information business.”

== Works Consulted ==
Roy, L, & Cherian, A. (Eds.). (2002). Getting Libraries the Credit They Deserve: A Festschrift in Honor of Marvin H. Scilken. Oxford: Scarecrow Press.
