= Mary Elizabeth Wood =

American librarian and missionary in China

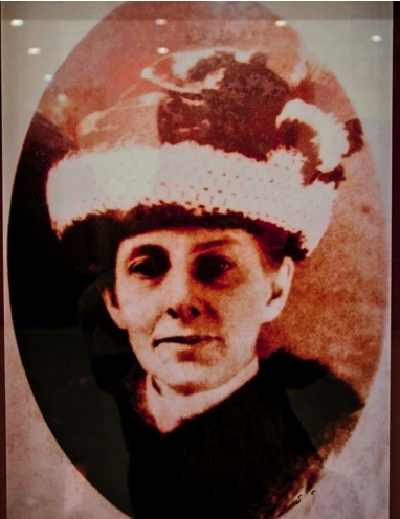
- Mary Elizabeth Wood
- Born: August 22, 1861; Elba, New York, U.S.
- Died: May 1, 1931 (aged 69); Wuchang, China
- Occupation: Librarian
- Known for: Her work in China

Mary Elizabeth Wood (August 22, 1861 – May 1, 1931) was an American librarian and missionary, best known for her work in promoting Western librarianship practices and programs in China. She is credited with the foundation of the first library school in China, the Boone Library School, as well as spurring the development of Chinese librarianship as a modern profession.

== Childhood and education ==
Mary Elizabeth Wood was born in Elba, New York, United States, to parents Edward Farmer and Mary Jane Wood. The only daughter among seven brothers, she attended a mixture of private and public schools while growing up in Batavia, New York. Wood later attended library school at Pratt Institute in New York City and at Simmons College. Described in her childhood as "a great reader," she was appointed the first librarian of the Richmond Memorial Library when she was twenty-eight years old, and worked there for ten years.

== Involvement with China ==
In 1899, she went to visit her youngest brother, Robert E. Wood, who was stationed as a missionary for the Protestant Episcopal Church in Wuchang, China. Her trip was initially spurred by concerns for her brother's safety, as anti-foreign riots had become increasingly common; however, Robert persuaded her to stay in China as an English teacher at the Boone School, a small preparatory school run by the mission. Initially, Wood seemed to regard her stay in China as "an extended visit," but she soon became concerned with the sparse educational resources at the school, particularly the lack of a library. By 1901, she had begun soliciting book donations from friends and acquaintances back in America, independently building a collection to support the Boone School.

After several years, Wood decided that a separate library building was necessary to house the collection, and she returned to America in 1906 with the dual purpose of raising construction funds and gaining professional library training. When she returned to China in 1908, she had secured financial resources and a library degree from the Pratt Institute Library School in Brooklyn, New York. Wood's engagement with the Boone library project gave her a strong sense of vocation, as she wrote that "'I feel that I have a call to do this work and that it is part of God's plan for China.'" She would spend the majority of her life heavily involved in the Chinese librarianship movement, returning to America on occasion to promote the further development and funding of library institutions, resources, and training programs in China.

== Early library projects ==
Wood's first major library project in China consisted of the establishment of the Boone School Library, and she acted as the chief advocate and director of this institution. Construction began on June 1, 1909, and was completed with the library's opening in 1910. The collection initially consisted of a mixture of secular and religious works, as well as photographs, with 3,000 volumes total in Chinese and English. Under Wood's leadership, the library rapidly developed, and within several years the collection had grown to 12,000 volumes total, with 5,000 in English and 7,000 in Chinese, as well as approximately 60 serial publications.

Not content to serve only Boone School's small academic community, Wood expanded her library outreach efforts by opening the library's reading rooms to the general public and offering its auditorium as a venue for public lectures. These lecture series, which covered "science, history, and current events," were a major attraction, drawing hundreds of attendees in the area. With the assistance of her student Shen Zurong, who acted as interpreter, Wood also started a set of traveling book collections of English works translated into Chinese for use in Chinese government schools. Shen and Wood became focused on disseminating library resources as widely as possible; their "mobile libraries" expanded access to neighboring cities, serving a combined population of 1.3 million, and they even hired workers to carry books up to mountain resorts popular with missionary families.

Despite these efforts, the general public reaction to library advocacy in China remained tepid, and Wood determined that the key to advancing the cause was the professionalization of librarians within China. Since there were no library schools in China at the time, in 1914 Wood sent Shen abroad to receive library training at the Library School of the New York Public Library. Another of her students, Hu Qingsheng, was to follow Shen's path in 1917. Wood hoped that training Chinese students in Western principles of modern librarianship would spark a revolution of the profession in China, with American-educated professionals returning to share their experience and knowledge with their peers. Upon completing their degrees, both Shen and Hu joined Wood in her next endeavor: establishing a library school within China.

== Boone Library School ==
Wood decided that the most cost-efficient solution to providing modern library training within China was to establish a school on the mainland, instead of sending students abroad to receive their degrees. By this time, the Boone School had grown into a university; the library school would be initially established as a department within the college. In 1918, Wood traveled to America to receive an additional year of library training at Simmons College; upon her return, she opened the Boone Library School in 1920 with nine students and herself, Shen, and Hu as teaching faculty members.

The school was structured on an American library curriculum model, with required courses in "library economy and administration, collection development, cataloging and classification, reference work, [and] bibliographical instruction." In addition, students were expected to study both German and French, and participated in practicums at public and school libraries. Admissions standards were extremely high, and graduates of the program went on to prestigious positions at leading Chinese libraries, which were eager to recruit them.

From 1922–1928, forty-five students graduated from Boone Library School, and largely entered careers in national and academic libraries in China. Many of the graduates also became actively involved in library research in the nation, writing articles on library science that appeared in journals published by the Boone Library School as well as other associations. In 1952, the Boone Library School was absorbed by Wuhan University; however, Wood stipulated in her will that Boone Library itself would remain an "independent public library" instead of reverting to a college library.

== Further advocacy work ==
Wood continued to campaign for the cause of libraries and librarianship in China for the remainder of her life. In 1924, she traveled to Washington, D.C. to speak with more than 500 senators and congressmen in a petition to allocate $6 million from the Boxer Indemnity Fund to public library development in China. The bill passed in May, and President Calvin Coolidge signed it into law. In the same year, Wood attended the American Library Association conference at Saratoga Springs, New York in order to present on Chinese librarianship developments; she successfully persuaded the association to dispatch Dr. Arthur E. Bostwick on a tour of China to assess the library situation and make recommendations for improvement.

During Bostwick's tour in 1925, Wood's mission saw further progress with the awarding of several grants, including a fund for establishing a national library in Beijing and a $10,000 annual award for scholarship support of the Boone Library School, along with the foundation of the Library Association of China in Beijing. In 1927, Wood signed on behalf of China as one of the 15 founding members of the International Federation of Library Associations, further strengthening ties with the international library community.

Wood also became a particularly outspoken champion of Chinese social and political causes in Washington; in 1927, she worked towards the cancellation of China's "unequal treaties," and was continuously involved in other programs such as providing shelters for rickshaw drivers and securing books for soldiers. She was a prominent liaison with leading Chinese educational and progressive officials, and her humanitarian and developmental efforts won widespread support and approval among the Chinese public.

However, Mary Elizabeth Wood was primarily known for her work in librarianship. In 1931, a "triple anniversary" commemorating Wood's arrival in China, the construction of the Boone Library, and the establishment of the Boone Library School was planned, but Mary Elizabeth Wood did not live to see the celebration; she died on May 1, 1931, in Wuchang, China. A memorial was held at Boone Library on June 13, with attendees including her former students, professional colleagues and graduates of library programs she had founded and inspired.
