= Ann Parham =

American librarian

Myrtis Ann Parham (1943 or 1944 in Columbus, Georgia) is an American librarian known for her work for the United States Department of Defense, including a 13-year term as Librarian of the Army. Parham remained a civilian throughout her career.

== Career ==
Parham received a master's degree in library science from Florida State University, where she had previously earned a bachelor's degree in social work and social studies education. Her first job as a librarian was at the Rowan Public Library in Salisbury, North Carolina.

Parham's work with the military began in 1976, when she was assigned to Camp Humphreys. Other assignments included Mannheim, Nurnberg, Wiesbaden, and Alexandria, Virginia.

She subsequently worked at the libraries of United States Army Materiel Command and the National Defense University, where she served as Chief of Research and Information Services. She also worked at the George C. Marshall European Center for Security Studies.

In December 1998, she was promoted to Librarian of the Army.

On September 2, 2011, Parham retired.

== Experience on 9/11 ==
On September 11, 2001, Parham was working in the Pentagon when American Airlines Flight 77 crashed into the building immediately below her office. While escaping the wreckage, she sustained a broken toe and second-degree burns to her face as well as to her ears and hands; the facial damage was subsequently repaired by a plastic surgeon who donated his services. Despite her injuries, Parham was present on-site for a meeting of the Deputy Chief of Staff G-1 Personnel of The United States Army on September 14th.

Much of the Pentagon's on-site library was destroyed during the attack; after her recovery, Parham oversaw the library's restoration. Her efforts in the restoration were cited in her being awarded the 2002 Federal Librarian of the Year award.
