= Evelyn Crowell =

American librarian

Evelyn Crowell

Evelyn Crowell (March 17, 1936 - June 5, 2017) was a librarian, author, speaker, activist, and community organizer in Portland, Oregon. She was the first single Black woman in Oregon to adopt children.

== Life ==
Born in Saginaw, Michigan on March 17, 1936, she moved with her father, grandfather, brother, and uncle to Oregon in 1942. They lived in North Portland and the men worked in the shipyards. She attended Boise Elementary school, the Girls Polytechnic High School, and Portland State College. She was in the third graduating class of Portland State College with a bachelor's degree, in 1959. She earned a Master's degree in library science from the University of Washington in 1960.

In 1970 she became the first single Black woman in Oregon to adopt children.

== Career ==
Crowell's first job, after obtaining her library science degree, was at Jefferson High School in North Portland. After one year at Jefferson, she accepted a librarian position at Fisk University in Tennessee where she worked for one year, before returning to Portland. She was then employed with the Multnomah county library system. In 1964 she became first Black faculty member of Linfield College, where she was a librarian. In 1970 she returned to Jefferson High School where she worked for two years. She worked at Portland State University, as an associate professor and librarian, from 1972 to 2002.

== Community involvement and activism ==
Evelyn Crowell was first Black Portland YWCA president and served the Portland Public Schools Board for one term. She was a generous donor to education and established numerous scholarships: The Evelyn I Crowell Endowed Opera Scholarship (PSU), The Evelyn I Crowell Endowed Theater and Film Scholarship (PSU), The Albert Crowell, Jr Memorial Scholarship (PSU), The Evelyn Crowell Scholarship through the PCC Foundation, and The Evelyn Crowell Endowed Scholarship (University of Portland).

== Legacy ==
The Portland Community College's Cascade Campus Library is home to the Evelyn Crowell Center for African American Community History.
