= Eva Unander =

Swedish librarian

Eva Unander, née Hjelmér (12 March 1774 - 1836) was a Swedish librarian. She was the second woman in Sweden to run a library, preceded by Cecilia Cleve, and the first to found and run a commercial lending library.

Born in Arboga, she was the daughter of tailor Johan Hjelmér and his wife Brita. Her father died in 1777 at the age of 44, and her mother died six years later at age 43. Little is known about her childhood. In 1801, she married the bookbinder Abraham Fredric Unander in Stockholm. They had one son, Conrad Fredric. Abraham died in 1816, leaving Eva as a widow and single mother, with debts twice as much as the value of her estate. In 1818, she opened a lending library in Södermalmstorg. Initially, she ran advertisements in the daily newspaper Daglig Allehanda to attract patrons. She eventually stopped these advertisements, possibly because the library had become well-established.

The patron could set the amount of time for the loan. The cost varied based on the number of books and the amount of time that they were borrowed, starting with four skillings to borrow a book for a day. Other books were also accepted as a form of collateral. The National Library of Sweden retains nine printed directories from Unander's library; a tenth directory may have existed and been lost. Eva Greek and Heléne Rova analyzed the languages and subject areas available in Unander's library catalogue, in order to analyze the reading tastes of the contemporary public. The library contained mostly fictional works, with many translated from other languages such as German.
