= Perham =

Perham may refer to:

== People ==
- Ina Perham (1888-1979), American painter
- Joe Perham (1932–2013), American humorist
- Linda Perham (born 1947), English politician
- Margery Perham (1895–1982), English historian
- Michael Perham (bishop) (1947–2017), Church of England bishop
- Michael Perham (born 1992), English sailor
- Richard Perham (1937–2015), English molecular biologist
- Sidney Perham (1819-1907), American politician

== Places ==
=== United Kingdom ===
- Perham Down, England

=== United States ===
- Perham, Maine
- Perham, Minnesota
- Perham Township, Otter Tail County, Minnesota
