= Mary Helen Mahar =

American librarian

- Born: Mary Helen Mahar; February 12, 1913; Schenectady, New York
- Died: March 23, 1998 (aged 85)
- Education: New York State College for Teachers, A.B, 1935; New York State College for Teachers, B.S. in Library Science, 1944; Columbia University, B.S., 1950
- Occupations: School librarian and school library developer
- Employer(s): Sag Harbor Public Schools; Pelham Public Schools; Scotia Public Schools, Mahar Public Schools; St. John’s University; New York State Teachers College; School of Library Service, Columbia University
- Organization: American Library Association
- Parent(s): John A. Mahar and Mary (Callahan) Mahar

Mary Helen Mahar (1913–1998) was an American librarian known for her work in school libraries. She was active in state and national library and education associations. She served as president of the New York Library Association in 1950. Throughout her career Mahar wrote about and implemented her philosophy of the importance of instructional materials in student learning. Mahar believed that professional librarians must do everything possible to meet individual needs and that school librarians must eschew a reputation for only organizing, housing and circulating books.

== Education ==
Mahar received her A.B. degree in 1935 from New York State College for Teachers in Albany. In 1944 she earned her B.S. in library science from the same institution; and in 1950, she was awarded an M.S. from the School of Library Service, Columbia University, New York.

== Library career and contributions ==
From 1935 to 1954, she was a high school librarian in several New York school districts: Sag Harbor Public Schools, Pelham, Scotia, and Garden City. During her tenure in Garden City, Mahar was also a summer instructor in library science at three universities: St. John's University Brooklyn, New York, 1948; New York State Teachers College, Geneseo, New York 1949 and 1950; and the School of Library Service, Columbia University, 1952 and 1953.

During this same period, Mahar was awarded a Fulbright Fellowship for 1951–1952 for a study of library services to children and young people in the United Kingdom. Upon her return to the United States in 1952, the American Library Association (ALA) appointed her to serve as its observer at the United Nations. When she finished that assignment in 1953, she worked for one more year in Garden City as a high school librarian.

In November 1954, Mahar accepted a position with the ALA as the executive secretary of the American Association of School Libraries (AASL). She stayed until August 1956, when she resigned to accept an appointment as a professor in the Division of Library Education at State University Teachers College, Geneseo, New York. In her 18-month tenure at AASL, she was able to encourage school library leaders to look far beyond present circumstances. She helped develop a philosophy of school librarianship that still drives school library media program development today.

Mahar believed that the development of good school libraries would come more quickly if the AASL would look beyond the organization and build bridges within the ALA and other professional education organizations. She felt that external relationships would give school librarians an opportunity to represent their field of librarianship and to interpret their work with young people.

In 1955, Mahar proposed a revision of school library standards, which would eventually be published as the groundbreaking Standards for School Library Programs (ALA, 1960). She also encouraged the division to take a stand on intellectual freedom and to publish “The School Library Bill of Rights” (ALA, 1955).

In November 1956, Mahar resigned her position with the AASL to accept an appointment as professor in the Division of Librarianship at New York Teachers College, Geneseo, New York. Although Mahar had strongly urged the AASL leadership to be more involved with the parent organization, it was the ALA's planned restructuring, to begin in 1957, which partially led to her departure. She also feared a negative impact on the AASL's growth and a loss of autonomy.

In 1957, Mahar moved to the U.S. Office of Education (USOE) as Children's Library Specialist in the Division of Library Services. Under the supervision of Nora Beust, she wrote and consulted throughout the country to help state and local education agencies use National Defense Education Act funds for improving school libraries.

In 1963, Mahar became coordinator of School Library Services in the Bureau of Educational Research and Development. As opportunities arose for restructuring the unit, she projected a scenario for the future that included more enabling legislation for improving school libraries. She continued to move through the agency in a progression of positions that reflected the changes relating to responsibility for elementary and secondary school libraries.

In 1966–1967, she was appointed chief, School Librarian Section. She was chief, Instructional Resources Branch, 1967–1968, and chief, Western Program Operations Branch, 1968–1972. In 1972, she assumed the position of chief of the School Media Resources Branch, Office of Libraries and Learning Resources, from which she retired in 1978.

After her retirement from the USOE, Mahar turned her attention to the school library needs of the international community. In 1979, the School of Education at the University of North Carolina at Greensboro awarded her a one-year appointment as a research assistant. She aimed her work primarily at United Nations Educational, Scientific, and Cultural Organization (UNESCO) and the World Bank.

== Publications ==
Throughout her experience as a practicing school librarian, Mahar wrote about and implemented of her philosophy of the importance of instructional materials in student learning. Mahar believed that professional librarians must do everything possible to meet individual needs and that the school librarian must eschew a reputation for only organizing, housing, and circulating books. Students and teachers should be able to locate a wide variety of materials organized and available for use in the school library.

Mahar's articles of the early 1950s hit on the theses that would drive her career: services and activities in a good school library, organizing all materials in the school library, and the value of school libraries in the learning process.

Throughout her tenure in the USOE, Mahar published annual statistical reports on school and public libraries. She also wrote about current school library issues for the state and national press. Her articles covered the gamut of now-familiar themes: certifying school librarians; evaluating school libraries; cooperative practices between administrators and librarians; public and school library cooperation; promising practices; and state and federal roles for school library development.

In 1960, Mahar published State Department of Education Responsibilities for School Libraries (U.S. Department of Health, Education, and Welfare, Office of Education, 1960). The document reported on a study conducted by the Library Services Branch of the USOE, done at the request of the Council of Chief State School Officers. The report set forth the responsibilities and services of school libraries as interpreted by state school systems.
