= Shen Zurong =

- Other name: Samuel T. Y. Seng
- Education: New York State Library School
- Occupation: Librarian

Shen Zurong (Chinese: 沈祖榮; pinyin: Shě Zǔróng; 1884–1977), also known as Samuel T. Y. Seng, is considered the "Father of Library Science in China". A native of Yichang, he was the first professional librarian in China and a main contributor to the New Library Movement in China in the early twentieth century. As a result, American librarianship principles, technology and education spread throughout China. Shen Zurong also co-founded the Boone Library School, the first library science educational institute in his country. It was absorbed into Wuhan University in 1952 and currently exists as the Wuhan University School of Information Management.

Shen Zurong was sent by the American librarian and missionary Mary Elizabeth Wood to study library science in 1914. Upon his return in 1917, he began a tour around China to promote American librarianship. Equipped with film, models and statistical charts, he went to almost every province in China. His contributions include the implementation of the Dewey Decimal System, providing a modern classification scheme for Chinese books, as well as the establishment and use of open-book stacks.

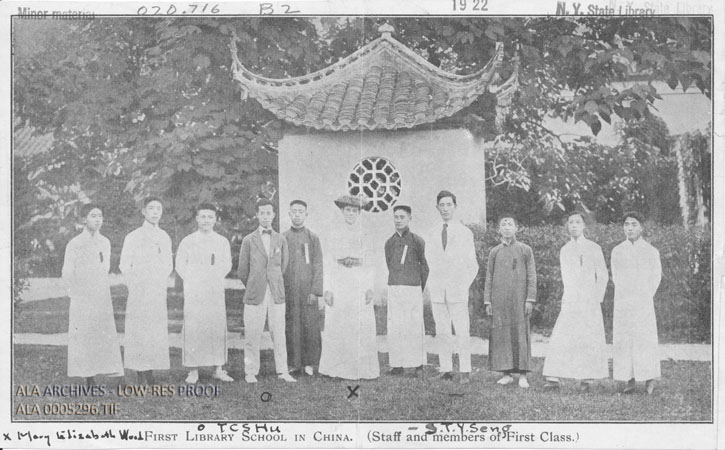
Shen Zurong is pictured fourth from the right.

== New Library Movement ==
Between 1917 and 1925, a group of newly trained Chinese librarians and Mary Elizabeth Wood launched a nationwide librarianship movement, which criticized the feudal library tradition in China, promoted American librarianship, introduced American library science and technology into China and raised the social standing of librarians. Mary Elizabeth Wood and Shen Zurong founded the Boone Library School in 1920, establishing China's first formal information education institution, which marked the beginning of structured library education in the country. Until the 1950s, almost all areas of Chinese librarianship were modeled on those in America. All modern classification schemes were based on the Dewey Decimal System, cataloging rules used the Library of Congress Classification, and the same courses taught in America were often translated directly into Chinese.
