= Louis A. Schultheiss =

Louis Avery Schultheiss (October 30, 1925 – December 11, 2014) was an American academic, librarian, and Emeritus Professor at the University of Illinois at Chicago. He was best known for his 1962 work on "Advanced Data Processing in the University Library."

== Biography ==
Schultheiss was born in October 1925 in Cody, Wyoming. He obtained his B.A. in History and Political Science, with a minor in Economics, from the University of Wyoming in 1949.

He started his academic career at the University of Denver in 1950 as Assistant Professor and was Assistant University Librarian, and librarian at the Art & Architecture Department. In 1958 he move to the University of Illinois at Chicago, where he was appointed Professor. He served for 31 years and retired August 1989. At the University Library he was in charge of Serials/Acquisitions, Director of Automation Project and later Head of the Technical Services Division.

His most cited work was "Advanced Data Processing in the University Library" (1962). This is the Final report of the University Library Information Systems Projects of the University of Illinois of Congress Circle, Chicago around 1960.

Schultheiss died in LaGrange, Illinois, in December 2014 at the age of 89.

== Work ==
=== Techniques of flow-charting. 1963 ===
In the early 1960s Schultheiss was Technical Services Librarian at the University of Illinois Library, and engaged in the upcoming automation of libraries. In 1960 the Library at the Chicago Undergraduate Division had received a grant by the Council on Library Resources to "study the application of advanced data processing techniques to university library procedures and to develop an overall system of utilizing the latest electronic equipment, as well as to study the adoption of business machines for library use." Louis Schultheiss from the regular library staff was appointed to direct tis project with Don Culbertson as his assistant.

Heiliger (1963) expressed, that the then upcoming "automation of libraries must come about through close cooperation between librarians and 'machine people'. Each must understand 'something of the other's specialty..." Ín order to facilitate the cooperation flowcharting was adopted. Heiliger explained, that "a good common language is provided by flow charts, which are simple workflow charts written in yes-no terms. They can be quickly understood by the 'machine people, and the technique of making them can be learned by a librarian in a very short time."

In his 1963 article "Techniques of flow-charting," Schultheiss described the process of creating flowcharts, and gave a series of eleven examples. About the origin of flowcharting Schultheiss stipulated:

"Flow-charting* is a very broad term used to describe a number of charting and diagramming operations, many of them not peculiar to data processing. Decision flow charting and work flow charting and diagramming have been used in other fields for many years, although the concept seems to be a relatively new one among librarians.

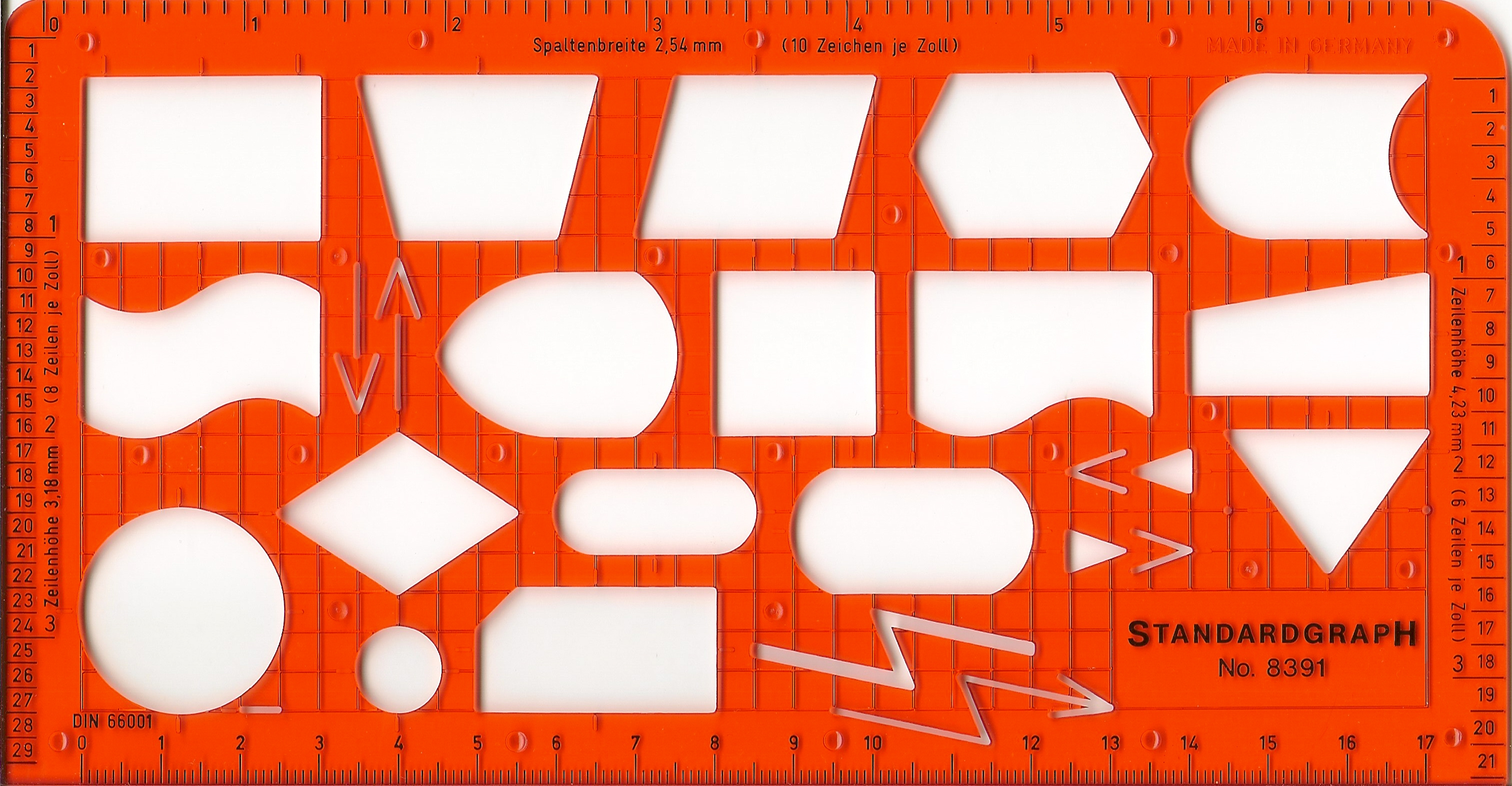
Diagram template for flow-charting.

About the character of flowcharting he further explained:

Flow charts... combine both physical actions and decision making in one logical flow. The type of operation (action, decision requirement, hold, etc.) is indicated by the shape of the box surrounding the written inscription. The choice of box shapes and sizes may become very elaborate and representational, and may be transcribed in a variety of formats; the Head of our Data Processing Department has often jokingly remarked that by using flow charts and magnetic tape reels we have rediscovered the pictogram and the scroll and are calling this progress.

For the construction of flow charts a standard diagramming template (see image) was adopted, which had the advantage that the "choices were limited to a small number of the shapes" provided by the template.

== Selected publications ==
- Schultheiss, Louis Avery. Don S. Culbertson and Edward M.Heiliger. Advanced data processing in the university library. New York : Scarecrow, 1962.
- Louis Avery Schultheiss, Don S. Culbertson. Applications of Advanced Data Processing Techniques to University Library Procedures: A Study for the University of Illinois at Congress Circle, Chicago. University of Illinois, 1962.

Articles, a selection

- Schultheiss, Louis A., and Edward M. Heiliger. "Techniques of flow-charting." (1963); with introduction by Edward Heiliger. In: Herbert Goldhor et al. (eds.) Proceedings, University of Illinois, Graduate School of Library Science, 1964. p. 62-78
- Schultheiss, Louis A. "Data processing aids in acquisitions work." Library Resources and Technical Services 9.1 (1965): 66–72.
- Schultheiss, Louis. "Systems analysis and planning." Data Processing in public and university libraries (1966): 95–102.
- Schultheiss, Louis A. "Introduction to Automation for Librarians (Book Review.)" in: College and Research Libraries, v.45 no.6, Nov. 1984, p. 517
