= Margaret Leiteritz =

German painter

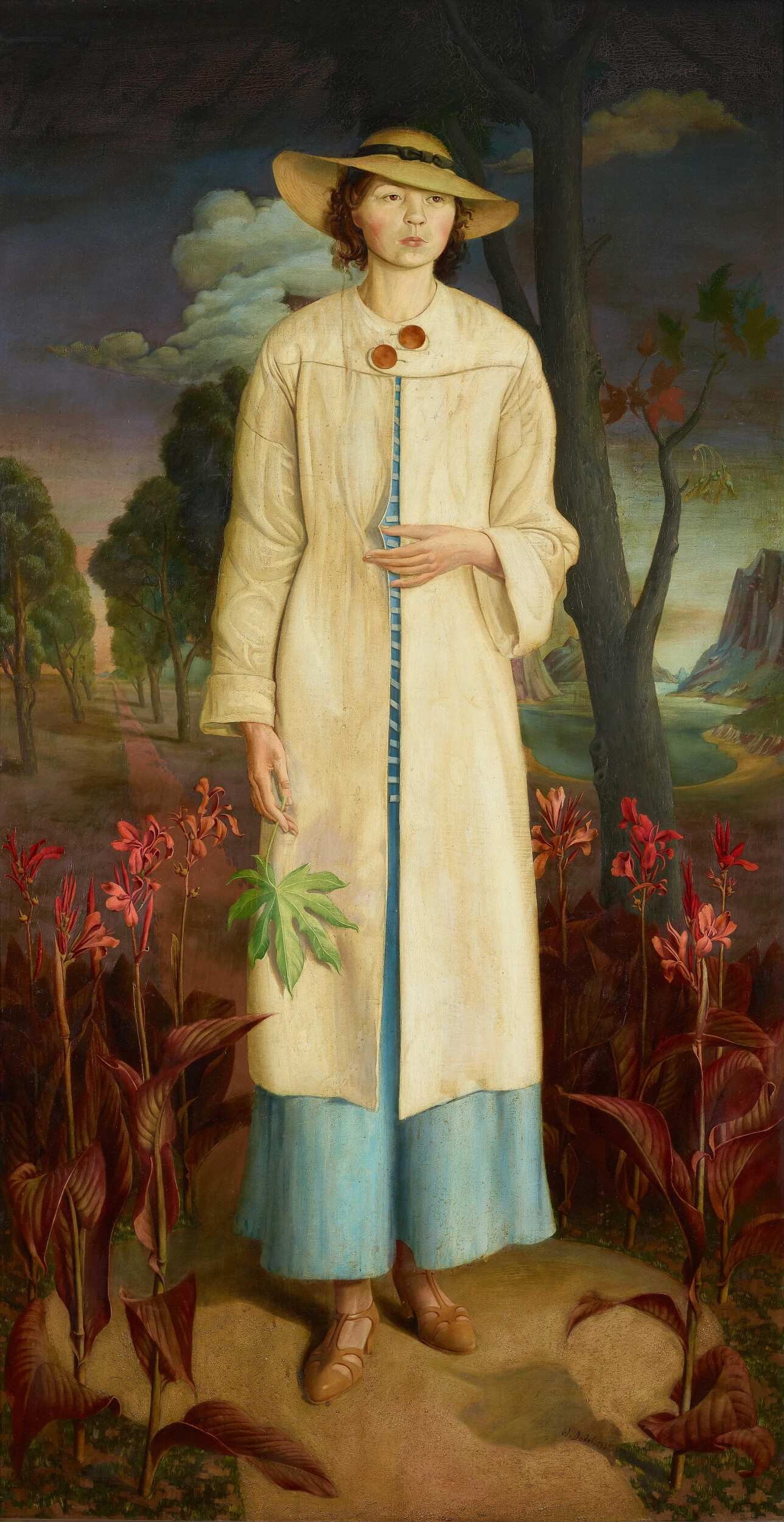
Wilhelm Dodel: Portrait of Margaret Leiteritz, 1935

Margaret Leiteritz (1907–1976) was a German painter who studied at the Bauhaus in Dessau from 1928 to 1931.

== Early life and education ==
Leiteritz was born in Dresden, Germany on April 19, 1907. Leiteritz was born into an artistic family as her father, Woldemar Leiteritz was an artist. Leiteritz attended a girls school until 1924 when she trained to become a librarian in Dresden and Leipzig until 1926. Following her training, Leiteritz worked at the Dresden Public Library until 1928 when she left after being accepted into the Bauhaus in Dessau in 1928.

Leiteritz took her prerequisite courses at the Bauhaus in Dessau under the instruction of Josef Albers, Hinnerk Scheper, Joost Schmidt, and Wassily Kandinsky. Leiteritz spent a large portion of her time at the Bauhaus with Hinnerk Scheper and Alfred Arndt studying in their mural painting workshops. Leiteritz continued her liberal arts education in studying under an array of artists such as Wassily Kandinsky and his abstract work, with Joost Schmidt and his writing and advertising, and Josef Albers' material and theory. She spent considerable time studying under Kandinsky and Klee in their free painting class having spent four semesters in the class. Leiteritz also explored personal expression in Schmidt's nude and figure drawing instruction in 1931. Ultimately, Leiteritz completed her vast array of studies and left the Bauhaus in 1931.

== Career ==
Throughout her time at the Bauhaus, Leiteritz became known for her now famous wallpaper designs. She took part in a competition brought by wallpaper manufacturer Gebr. Rasch GmbH & Company, and split prizes between her friend Hans Fischli. Subsequently, Leiteritz took wallpaper design as a priority and was appointed to head the production of Bauhaus wallpapers.

In her later life in the 1960s and early 1970s, Leiteritz produced 'painted diagrams', which drew heavily from the scientific articles and books in her care.

Many of her works were strongly influenced by chemical engineering, and especially the field's graphs which depicted physical properties of substances. Leiteritz's paintings typically reworked a mundane graph using large expanses of colour and a bold abstract theme, changing it into a dynamic painting. Other works are reminiscent of Bunsen burner flame or DNA gel.

One of her most famous paintings, "Crossing at the Left Border" (1966;oil on linen), appeared on the cover of the catalogue for an art exhibition in Chicago in 1969. This painting is known to have been inspired by a specific graph appearing in an otherwise unremarkable paper of the American Institute of Chemical Engineering Journal.

Her work has much in common with that of Paul Klee.
