= Australian Law Librarians' Association =

Professional legal library organization

The Australian Law Librarians' Association (ALLA) is the professional body for Law Library staff in Australia. Currently it has official state level bodies in NSW, Victoria, South Australia, Northern Territory and Western Australia and supports the industry through professional development, special interest publications, and events. Formally, it is an incorporated association.

== History ==
The Association started when a group of six librarians met to start an informal network, in 1969. It was initially known as the Australian Law Librarians Group. From then, through the 1970s and 1980s, the group gradually grew to cover most states in Australia. Over the first two decades of its existence, the association expanded more into a wide variety of areas of legal practice.

Dorothy Shea was the association's president between 2004 and 2005. The group changed its name from the Law Librarians Group to the Australian Law Librarians' Association in 2006. In 2013, after some years of negotiation and practice, the Association established centralised memberships, and with a stronger central role. This caused some states, Tasmania and Queensland, to drop out of the Association at the time.

== Coverage ==
ALLA represents both librarians and associated information professionals. It covers those librarians working in the court system, as well as law firms, the academic sector, Universities and Government Departments.

== Activities ==
ALLA acts as a news portal and a source of information about industry developments for Australian legal professionals. It also organises and runs the regular Australian Law Librarians' Conference, held every two years. This conference is rotated around the country's capital cities, and can attracts up to 300 information professionals and industry representatives from all around Australia.

== Journal ==
The official journal for ALLA is the Australian Law Librarian, starting with its first volume published in 1993. This journal features articles on legal research, information technology, industry news, Information science, foreign developments, and articles of general interest to the profession.

Annually, recognition for writing in the journal is made by the granting of the Ted Glasson Award, for the best featured article.

== Website ==
- The website as it appeared in 2008, has been archived on the Pandora Archive
