= Cecilia Cleve =

Swedish librarian

Cecilia Cleve, née Dahlin (died 8 February 1819), was a pioneering Swedish librarian, considered by some to be the first female librarian in Sweden.

Cecilia Cleve was the sister of the fashionable furniture maker and designer Nils Dahlin. She married Freidrich August Cleve from Magdeburg in Germany, who was active as a printer, and who in 1787 opened what is sometimes referred to as the first lending library in Stockholm. When she became a widow in 1796, Cecilia Cleve renounced the guild printer privilege to which she was entitled after her late spouse. However, she kept his right to keep a public lending library, and managed it until her death. She did this despite having a widow pension that was sufficient to support herself and her foster children.

She catalogued the books in alphabetic order, which was at the time an innovation, quarterly subscriptions and advertises in the country papers. She managed the library with success and it reportedly contained 8,000 volumes. By 1800, five other lending libraries had been founded in Stockholm, but she remained the only female librarian until Eva Unander opened one in Slussenområdet in 1816.
