= Morris L. Cohen =

American lawyer, law librarian and professor

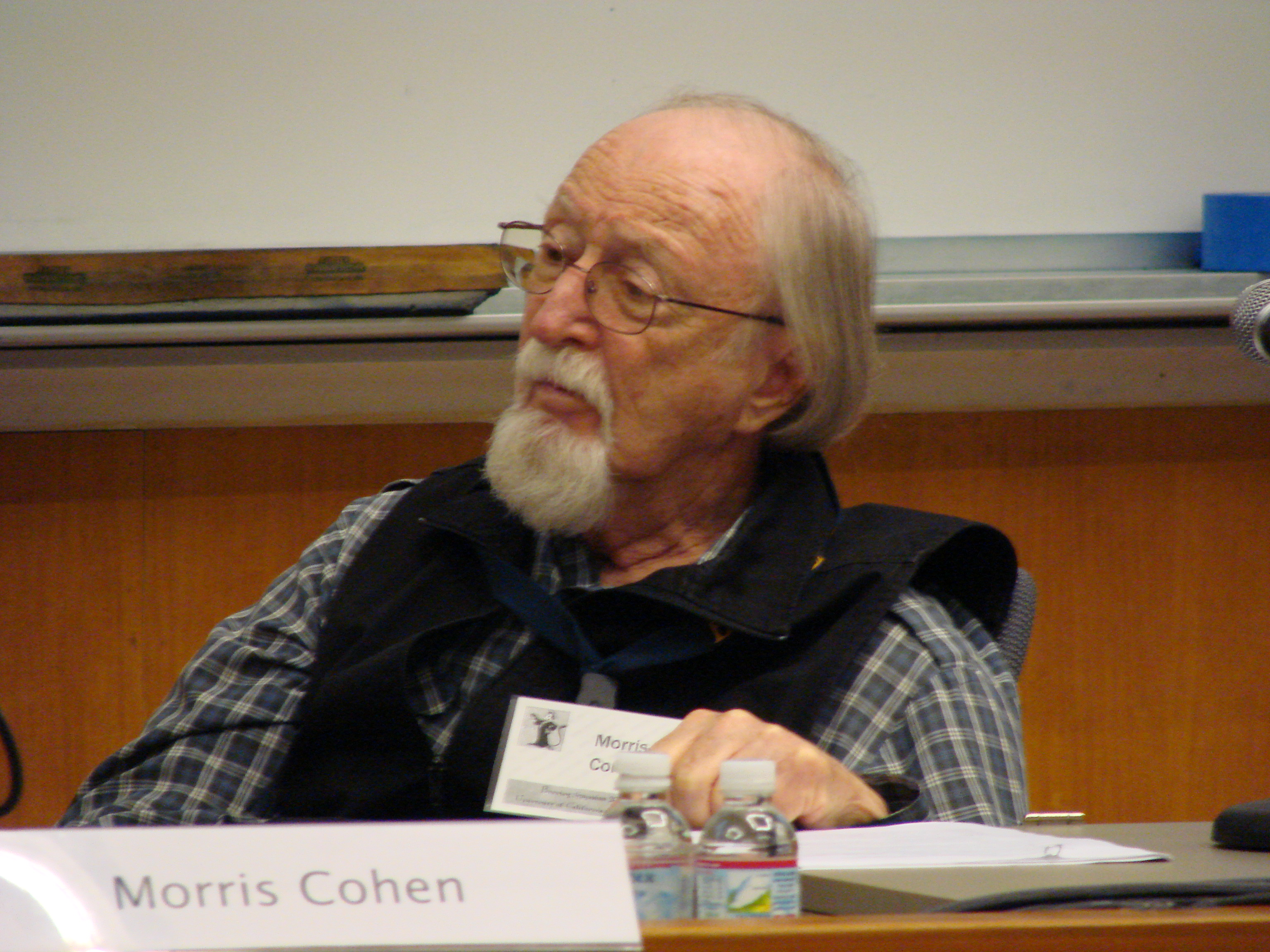
- Morris L. Cohen, 2006
- Born: Morris Leo Cohen; November 2, 1927; Bronx, New York, US
- Died: December 18, 2010 (aged 83); New Haven, Connecticut, US
- Occupations: Law librarian, law professor

Morris Leo Cohen (November 2, 1927 – December 18, 2010) was an American attorney who left the practice of law to become a law librarian and professor of law at the University at Buffalo, University of Pennsylvania, Harvard Law School and Yale Law School. Described by The New York Times as "one of the nation's most influential legal librarians", he wrote extensively about the history of law and helped organize and computerize the law libraries at Harvard and Yale.

Cohen was born on November 2, 1927, in The Bronx and attended the New York City Public Schools. He received his undergraduate degree at the University of Chicago in 1947 and was awarded a J.D. from Columbia Law School in 1951.

His efforts to specialize in labor law were thwarted when firms refused to hire him because of his involvement with left-wing organizations and Cohen instead went into a law practice with his uncle. As his wife described, Cohen "wasn't cut out for practicing law" and chose to attend the School of Library and Information Science at the Pratt Institute, where he earned a Master of Library Science degree while he was working at the library at Rutgers University. He focused the remainder of his career as a law librarian and professor, and would later describe how he "celebrated my departure from practice as a great emancipation". At Yale Law School he served as the school's law librarian starting in 1981 and was a lecturer at the law school starting in 1991. He donated his "Juvenile Jurisprudence Collection" to the Yale Law Library in 2009, a collection he had started decades earlier that included early publications related to juvenile law.

While working as director of the law libraries of SUNY Buffalo, the University of Pennsylvania, Harvard and Yale, Cohen authored A Bibliography of Early American Law in 1998, a six-volume tome that he had worked on for over three decades that provided a comprehensive catalog of all legal works published in the United States before 1860. His 1968 book Legal Research in a Nutshell was released in nine editions, the most recent in 2007. Other works he wrote or co-authored include Law and Science, A Selective Bibliography (1980), How to Find the Law (1983), Finding the Law (1989), Law: The Art of Justice (1992), A Guide to the Early Reports of the Supreme Court (1995), Bench and Bar: Great Legal Caricatures from Vanity Fair (1997) and Joseph Story and the Encyclopædia Britannica (2006).

A resident of New Haven, Connecticut, Cohen died at the age of 83 of leukemia on December 18, 2010, at his home there.
