= Subject librarian =

Librarian specializing in a particular topic

Subject librarians, also known as specialist librarians or academic liaison librarians and sometimes bibliographers in US-English are librarians responsible for a section of a library in regards to a particular academic subject. They are mainly in academic libraries and specialist libraries (such as legal libraries or medical libraries), but are also found in large non-academic libraries such as national or state libraries. In academic libraries, they work together with the faculty of their specialist subject to ensure the quality of their collection and manage required recommended course readings.

Subject librarianship as a specific role developed in the 1960s, when many academic institutions began to put more funding into their libraries.

== Education ==
Subject librarians need both academic knowledge of their subject as well as skills in library science. While some argue about whether formal education in the specialist subject is necessary, while others believe it is a vital component of a subject librarian's education.

In Australia, most subject librarians have an undergraduate degree in their specialist subject and further education in an accredited library sciences course, such as a Master of Information Management.

== Responsibilities ==
While subject librarians would generally not work at the enquiry desk, they may answer online queries related to their specialist topic.

=== Collection management and development ===
Having knowledge in a subject gives a subject librarian a strong advantage over a general librarian in knowing what resources are advantageous to have for students and researchers. Their responsibilities for sections of the library collection that fall within their topic may include acquiring relevant materials, based on classes if at a university, cataloguing and classification of topics, and weeding out-of-date or unused resources.

=== Liaison with academic staff ===
As suggested in the name "academic liaison librarian", subject librarians play an important role in ensuring good communication between the library and the professors in a university. This can include:

- Choosing required/recommended course readings based on what resources the library already has available
- Analysing cost/benefit for acquiring new resources as requested by faculty members, and acquiring said resources if applicable
- Providing online resources for faculty and students
- Encouraging professors to make students aware of the library's resources
- Help students and researchers find resources in specific topics related to their subject

=== Education ===
Having knowledge of a subject, the existing classes relating to it, and what information is available through the library allows subject librarians in universities to assist in creating course plans based on what information is available to students.
