= Rowan Public Library =

Library system in North Carolina, United States

The Rowan Public Library is a public library system in Rowan County, North Carolina. It was founded in 1911.

== History ==
On March 11, 1911 a group called Traveler's Club met at the Lodge of Salisbury Benevolent and Protective Order of Elks, on the second floor of the Meroney Theater in Salisbury, North Carolina. At this meeting a library association was formed. Archibald Henderson Boyden, a former mayor of Salisbury and a leader and later chairman of the city school board, was elected chairman of the library association. Boyden family offered to house the first public library of Salisbury on the property they owned in the small Henderson Law Office located in the corner of Church and Fisher Streets. In 1952 A.H.Boyden's daughter, Mrs.Burton Craig gifted the lot with the law office to Rowan County for the purpose of establishing a library. Boyden heirs donated additional $75,000 for the construction of the new library building.

In 1913 Mrs. Mamie Linton accepted the position of a librarian. During this time the library moved to the former County Courthouse, dubbed the Community Building, and shared space with the police station. In 1936 the library employed its first professionally trained librarian, Miss Edith Montcalm Clark, who served as Director of Rowan Public Library for 36 years until 1972. Ms.Clark was the person who made the library from cataloging the book collection to physical expansion of the library into Spencer, China Grove, Faith, Landis, and Rockwell. She changed the name of the library from Salisbury to Rowan to reflect the spread of libraries in the county.

In November 2019, Melissa Oleen took over as Library Director after the retirement of Jeff Hall.

== Current services ==
- Public Programs
- History and Genealogy
- Computers and Internet Access
- Digital Services

== Library branches ==
- Rowan Public Library Headquarters in Salisbury, North Carolina
- East Branch Library in Rockwell, North Carolina
- Frank T. Tadlock South Rowan Regional Library in China Grove, North Carolina, renamed in October 2006 in honor of the former Commissioner of Rowan County, who was instrumental in establishing the library.
- West Branch Library in Cleveland, North Carolina

== Notable holdings ==
A letter from President George Washington was donated by local businessman Irving Oestreicher in 1951. It contains an "address of the Citizens of Salisbury to Washington" and Washington's reply. The letter stands on display at the Headquarters branch of the library.

In 1999, The Natural History of Carolina, Florida and the Bahama Islands by Mark Catesby was donated to the library by Archibald Craige. The two volume work is the second edition printed in 1754 and is one of only approximately eighty copies in existence. The volumes were reconditioned and placed in special display cases and placed near the History Room at the Headquarters branch.
