= Jenkins Law Library =

Coordinates: 39.9535731°N 75.1703402°W

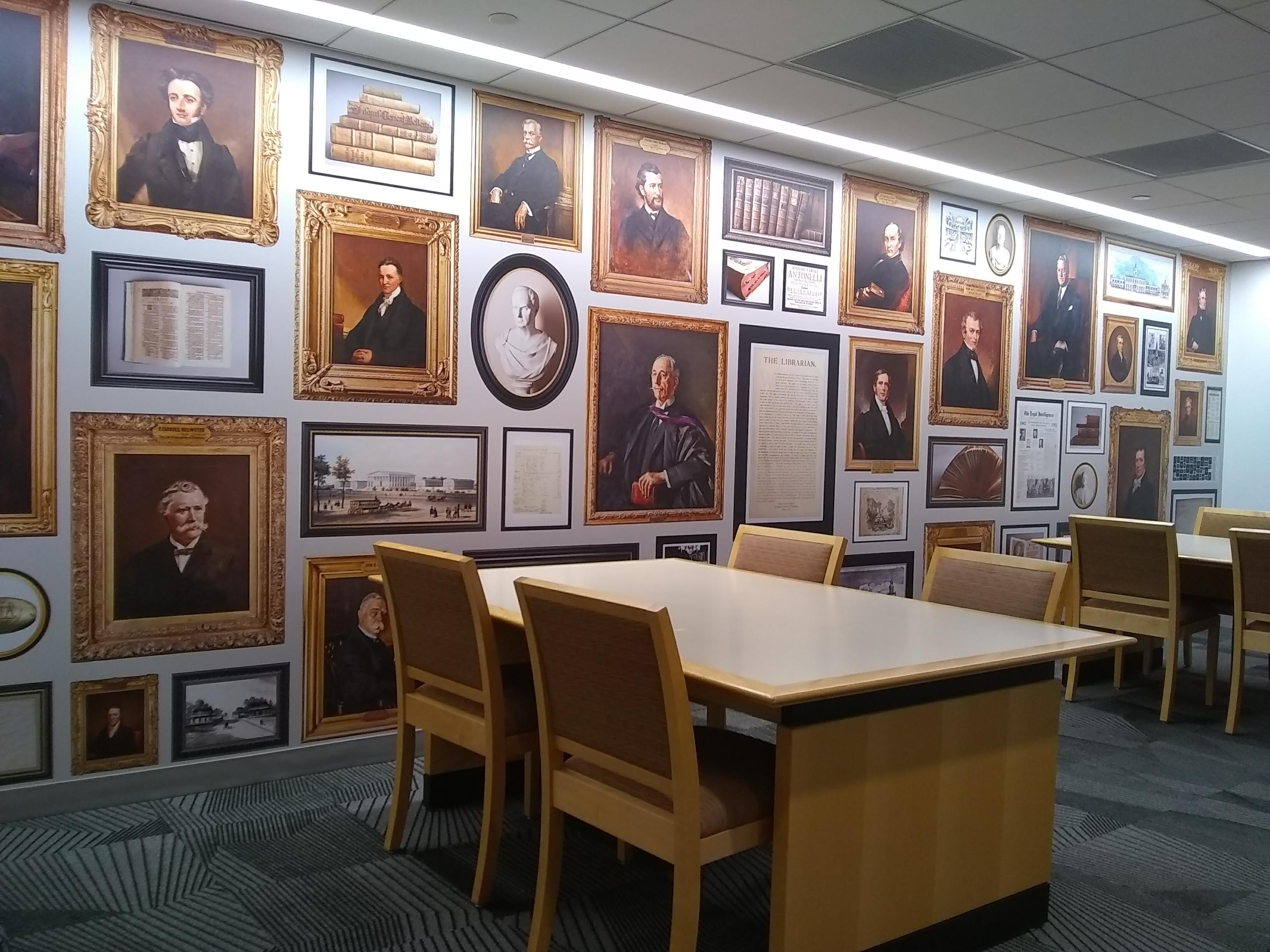
The wallpaper contains digitized images of portraits that used to hang in Jenkins' Reading Room at 833 Chestnut Street.

Jenkins Law Library was founded in 1802, and is America's first law library. Jenkins is a membership library, located in Philadelphia, Pennsylvania, serving the local legal community, including self-represented litigants.

== History ==
The Law Library Company of the City of Philadelphia was created by 71 attorneys, among whom were the most prominent lawyers of the time. They formed a corporation so they could jointly purchase a collection of legal materials with which to practice law. Shares of stock in the company were sold for $20; annual dues were $2.

In 1827, the Law Library Company merged with the Associated Members of the Bar and became known as the Law Association of Philadelphia. Eventually this organization became known as the Philadelphia Bar Association, and in 1931 the library's name was changed (the first of several name changes) to the Law Library of the Philadelphia Bar Association.

The library was operated by the Bar Association until July 1, 1967, when the Theodore F. Jenkins Memorial Law Library (now known as Jenkins Law Library) was established with court approval to carry out the provisions of the will of the late Madeleine Hart Jenkins. It was her wish that her late husband, Theodore Finley Jenkins, be memorialized in a manner that would benefit the Bar and the public.

Governed by a Board of Directors, Jenkins Law Library is a 501(c)(3). Although now independent from the Philadelphia Bar Association, the two organizations work together on mutual projects that benefit members of the Philadelphia legal community.

When it came time to renovate the Jenkins Law Library in 2004, Executive Director Regina Smith had one thought in mind – make the library a destination for lawyers, not a book warehouse.

After more than 30 years at 833 Chestnut Street, in late 2018 Jenkins moved across town to 1801 Market Street, in Ten Penn Center.
