= Leon Carnovsky =

American librarian and educator (1903–1975)

- Born: November 28, 1903; St. Louis, Missouri, U.S.
- Died: December 6, 1975 (aged 72); Oakland, California, U.S.
- Education: University of Missouri; University of Chicago (PhD)
- Occupations: Librarian; educator
- Spouse(s): Marian Satterthwaite (m. 1939; died 1965) Ruth French Strout (m. 1967)
- Parent(s): Isaac Carnovsky; Jennie Stillman Carnovsky
- Relatives: Morris Carnovsky (brother)
- Awards: Melvil Dewey Medal (1962); Joseph W. Lippincott Award (1975)

Leon Carnovsky (November 28, 1903 – December 6, 1975) was an American librarian and educator who focused much of his career surveying libraries in the United States and around the globe. Carnovsky was recognized by American Libraries as one of the 100 most influential figures in Library and Information Sciences.

== Personal life ==
Carnovsky was born on November 28, 1903, in St. Louis, Missouri, one of seven children born to Isaac, a grocer from Lithuania, and Jennie Stillman Carnovsky, both Jewish immigrants from the Russian Empire. The actor Morris Carnovsky (1897–1992) was his elder brother. In early life, Carnovsky found intellectual pursuits to be most interesting, and was encouraged by his parents to continue his intellectual growth, which included frequent trips to the local library.

As a young man in the library profession, Leon met Marian Satterthwaite, director of the Enoch Pratt Free Library training class in Baltimore, and was eventually married on August 25, 1939. After her death in January 1965, Leon was remarried in 1967 to Ruth French Strout, dean of students and associate professor in the University of Chicago Graduate Library School.

== Education ==
After completing his grade school education, Carnovsky took a position in St Louis as a secretary in a manufacturing company that produced pistons and piston rings, not planning to further his education. However, after much prodding from his boss, he decided to return to the University of Missouri to pursue a degree in journalism. After a short time at the university, he became enamored with his philosophy professor, Glenn R. Morrow, and changed his major to philosophy, with a minor in sociology. Upon completion of his degree, he researched the possibility of pursuing a career in librarianship.

After studying as the first male library student at the St. Louis library school for a year, he received a scholarship from the Carnegie Foundation and moved to Chicago to pursue a master's degree from the new University of Chicago Graduate Library School. During his tenure in the Graduate Library School, he was convinced to continue his studies past the attainment of a master's degree and instead completed his Ph.D., titling his dissertation “The Reading Needs of Typical Students, with Special Attention to Factors Contributing to the Satisfactions of Reading Interests.”

== Early career ==
After graduating from the University of Chicago, Carnovsky joined the faculty of the university in 1932 as an instructor, a position that he kept until his retirement in 1971. During his early career at the university, he, along with many other faculty, began to write to further the academic purpose of the Graduate Library School. Many of these works focused on the theory behind library science, as opposed to earlier works that primarily included “trade-schoolish” direction.

== Surveyor of libraries ==
As Carnovsky began to further his career, he became more interested in the inner workings of public libraries. He undertook his first library survey during his early teaching career. During the survey of metropolitan library services, which was funded by the Chicago Library Club, Carnovsky developed a comprehensive list by which to guide future surveys that would be conducted by himself and his colleagues. During his career, he was asked to contribute to surveys of libraries across the country and around the world.

From his surveys, Carnovsky provided reports that discussed his findings, many of which were collaborative pieces. These surveys were conducted throughout the United States, including Michigan, New York, Illinois, and North Carolina.

== Other major professional accomplishments ==
Later on in his career, issues surrounding international librarianship became of great concern to Carnovsky. He became an important consultant across the world, and conducted surveys of libraries in many different countries. As a consultant to the United Nations Educational, Scientific, and Cultural Organization (UNESCO), he advised the Israeli government on the potential opportunity to open a school for library education. Upon his recommendation in his report “Report on a Programme of Library Education in Israel,” the beginnings of a library education were built. After the completion of his work in Israel, UNESCO asked him to conduct a similar study in Greece; however, his recommendations were not followed in this case.

Along with his constant analysis through library surveys, Carnovsky also held various board positions with the American Library Association (ALA), was President of the Association of American Library Schools in 1942-43, and received a Fulbright Grant to conduct a study of international public libraries. During the time that Carnovsky served as the chairman of the ALA Committee on Accreditation, he spent his time travelling to libraries throughout the country to conduct accreditation visits. In his post as editor of the Library Quarterly, which he held from 1943 to 1961, Carnovsky became more well known for his contributions to international librarianship.

He was honored by the American Library Association with the Melvil Dewey Medal in 1962 and the Joseph W. Lippincott Award in 1975.

== Publications ==
Throughout his career, Carnovsky furthered the work of librarians in the United States and around the world by publishing many works that discussed the issues that were at the heart of librarianship. His extensive bibliography includes journal articles, reports, addresses, books, letters, biographies, and even a poem or two. According to a 1968 bibliography, some of his many works include:

- "The Dormitory Library: An Experiment in Stimulating Reading." (1933). The Library Quarterly: 37–65.
- "A Study of the Relationship between Reading Interest and Actual Reading." (1934). The Library Quarterly: Information Community Policy: 76–110.
- "Why Graduate Study in Librarianship?" (1937). The Library Quarterly: Information Community Policy: 246–61.
- 1940. A Metropolitan Library in Action : A Survey of the Chicago Public Library by Carleton Bruns Joeckel and Leon Carnovsky. Chicago: Ill. the University of Chicago Press.
- "Preparation for the Librarian’s Profession. (1942). The Library Quarterly: 404–11.
- "Self-Evaluation: Or, How Good Is My Library?" (1942).College & Research Libraries" 304–10.
- The Library in General Education. (1943) Wilson, Louis R; Ralph A Beals, Leon Carnovsky, Bess Goodykoontz, and Nelson B Henry. Chicago: University press.
- "An Experiment to Stimulate Reading on Latin America." (1943), ALA Bulletin: 293–96.
- "Can the Public Library Defend the Right to Freedom of Inquiry?" (1944). ALA Bulletin: 255–57.
- The Obligations and Responsibilities of the Librarian Concerning Censorship. (1950). Chicago: University of Chicago Press.
- "The Public Libraries of Paris." (1952). The Library Quarterly: Information Community Policy: 194–99.
- Pierce Butler, 1886-1953. (1953). The Library Quarterly: Information Community Policy 153–54.
- “The Public Library in the United States.” (1953). Libri: 281–91.
- International Aspects of Librarianship. (Chicago: University of Chicago Press). 1954. Also in German.
- 1954. “Patterns of Library Government and Coverage in European Nations.” The Library Quarterly: 138–53.
- “Public Library Surveys and Evaluation.” (1955). The Library Quarterly: 23–36.
- Report of a Programme of Library Education in Israel. (1956.) Paris: Unesco.
- A Library School for Greece: A Prospectus. Unesco. (1962). Chicago: Graduate Library School University of Chicago.
- The Medium-Sized Library: Its Status and Future. (with) Howard W Winger. (1963). Chicago: University of Chicago Press.
- "The Role of the Public Library: Implications for Library Education." (1964). The Library Quarterly: Information Community Policy: 315–25.
- The Public Library in Urban Setting.(1968). Chicago: University of Chicago Press.
- Library Networks - Promise and Performance: July 29–31, 1968. (1969). Chicago: Univ. of Chicago Press.
- The Foreign Student in the Accredited Library School (1971). Washington D.C: U.S. Office of Education.

Undated:

- Impressions of British Librarianship Today: A Symposium by Recent Visitors
- Measure for Measure
- UNESCO Summer School
- I Never Enjoyed Such a Year
- Library Education in the United States: A Statement of its Rationale
- The Library as a Social Institution
- Publishing the Results of Research in Librarianship
- What People Want to Read About
- Reading in a College Residence Hall
- Libraries in Nazi Germany
- They Read: What Then?
- T. E. Lawrence
- Worst Periodical Usually Found in Library Reading Rooms with Reasons – from the Point of View of Its Influence on American Civilization
- On In-Service Training
- Kellogg Foundation Institute
- War and the Reading Public
- Toward World Literacy

== End of life ==
After the end of his career at the University of Chicago in 1971, Carnovsky relocated to his retirement home in Oakland, California. He died there on December 6, 1975.
