= List of female librarians =

This is a list of female librarians.

Name	Description	Birth	Death	Image
Lubna of Córdoba	Andalusian librarian	0900-00-00	1000-00-00	
Ada Adler	Danish classical scholar	1878-02-18	1946-12-28	
Adelaide Hasse	American librarian	1868-09-13	1953-07-07	
Adelaide Underhill	American academic librarian	1860	1936-04-24	Adelaide Underhill picture
Agnes Inglis	American anarchist	1870-12-03	1952-01-30	
Alia Muhammad Baker	Iraqi librarian			
Alice Dugged Cary	African-American educator and librarian	1859	1941-09-25	
Alice Ethel Minchin	Teacher, librarian - New Zealand	1889-11-05	1966-07-26	
Alice Lougee Hagemeyer	American librarian	1934		
Alice Prochaska	Curator, archivist, librarian, and university administrator - UK	1947-07-12		
Alice S. Tyler	American librarian and advocate	1859-04-27	1944-04-18	
Alicia Perales Ojeda	Mexican librarian and director of the Central Library at UNAM	1922-10-24	1994-06-04	
Alisz Goriupp	Librarian, media historian and bibliographer from Hungary	1894-08-18	1979-02-04	
Allie Beth Martin	American librarian	1931-12-27	1976-04-11	
Alma Dawson	American librarianship scholar			
Alma Smith Jacobs	American librarian	1916-11-21	1997-12-18	
Althea Warren	American; director of the LA Public Library, president of the American Library Association	1866-12-18	1958-12-19	
Amalia Kahana-Carmon	Israeli writer	1926-10-18	2019-01-16	
Amelia Gayle Gorgas	American librarian	1826-06-01	1913-01-03	
Ana Rosa Nuñez	Cuban writer	1926-07-11	1999-08-02	
Ana Santos Aramburo	Spanish librarian	1957-01-22		
Anabel Torres	Colombian writer	1948-12-26		
Ángela García Rives	Spanish librarian	1891-06-02	1968 or later	
Anita Coleman	American librarian			
Ann Allen Shockley	American novelist and short-story writer	1927		
Ann Hartness	American librarian	1936-03-11		
Ann Shumelda Okerson	American librarian	1950		
Ann Wolpert	American librarian	1943-10-01	2013-10-02	
Anna Harriet Heyer	American librarian, musicologist and music educator	1909-08-30	2002-08-12	
Anne Hart	Canadian author specialising in biographies	1935-10-07	2010-10-09	
Anne Jarvis	American academic and librarian	1962-07-31		
Anne Spencer	American poet	1882-02-06	1975-07-27	
Anne Thaxter Eaton	American author, book reviewer and children's librarian	1881-05-08	1971-05-05	
Annette Curtis Klause	American writer and librarian	1953-06-23		
Annette Lewis Phinazee	American librarian	1920-07-23	1983-09-17	
Annie Carroll Moore	American writer	1871-07-12	1961-01-20	
Annie Constance Tocker	New Zealand librarian, Methodist deaconess, nurse, child welfare officer	1889	1980	
Annie Maude Blackett	New Zealand librarian	1889-07-30	1956-06-12	
Arlene Mosel	American children's librarian, educator, and writer	1921-08-27	1996	
Audre Lorde	American writer and activist	1934-02-18	1992-11-17; 1992-11-11	
Augusta Braxton Baker	American librarian	1911-04-01	1998-02-23	
Augusta Clark	American politician	1932-03-05	2013-10-13	
Aurora Díaz-Plaja i Contestí	Spanish writer	1913-08-07	2003-12-08	
Barbara Fister	American writer	1954		
Barbara Tillett	American librarian	1946		
Beatrice Doran	Irish librarian			
Beatrice Winser	American librarian	1869-03-11	1947-09-14	
Belle da Costa Greene	American librarian	1883-12-13	1950-05-10	
Berta Golob	Slovene writer and poet	1932-08-09		
Beryl May Dent	British librarian and mathematical physicist	1900-05-10	1977-08-09	
Bess Thomas	Australian librarian	1892-03-14	1968-03-07	
Bessie Boehm Moore	American librarian	1902-08-02	1995-10-24	
Betty Blackman	American librarian and first African-American library dean of the California State University System	1931-10-07	2022-10-04	
Betty Mary Goetting	American women's rights activist	1897	1980	
Brenda Rawnsley	British art patron, military writer, educationist, librarian	1916-07-31	2007-07-25	
Brooke E. Sheldon	American librarian	1931-08-29	2013-02-11	
Camila Alire	American librarian, professor			
Camilla Gryski	Canadian writer			
Camille Callison	Indigenous librarian, archivist, academic, and cultural activist who is a member of the Tsesk iye (Crow) Clan of the Tahltan Nation			
Carla Hayden	American librarian, 14th Librarian of Congress	1952-08-10		
Carol Kuhlthau	American educator	1937-12-02		
Caroline Hewins	American librarian	1846-10-10	1926-11-04	
Carolyn Harris	American librarian	1948	1994	
Catherine N. Norton	American librarian	1941	2014-12-22	
Catherine Reilly	British bibliographer and anthologist	1925-04-04	2005-09-26	
Celeste West	American librarian	1942-11-24	2008-01-03	
Charlemae Hill Rollins	American librarian	1897-06-20	1979-02-03	
Claire Huchet Bishop	American children's writer	1899	1993-03-13	
Clara Breed	American librarian	1906-03-19	1994-09-08	
Clara Stanton Jones	American librarian	1913-05-14	2012-09-30	
Clara Whitehill Hunt	American librarian	1871	1958	
Clare B. Dunkle	American writer	1964-06-11		
Claudia McNeil	American actress	1917-08-13	1993-11-25	
Constance Mabel Winchell	American librarian	1896-11-02	1983-05-23	
Cynthia Rylant	American author of children's books and librarian	1954-06-06		
Dale DeArmond	American artist	1914-07-02	2006-11-21	
Deanna B. Marcum	American librarian	1946-08-05	2022-08-16	
Dina Abramowicz	librarian at YIVO; Yiddish language expert	1909	2000	
Dionne Mack	American librarian	1973		
Dolores Elizabeth “Lola” Chávez de Armijo	American librarian	1858	1929	
Dolors Lamarca i Morell	Spanish librarian	1943-10-19		
Doris Gates	American children's writer, librarian	1901-11-26	1987-09-03	
Dorothy B. Porter	American librarian	1905-05-25	1995-12-17	
Dorothy M. Crosland	American librarian	1903-09-13	1983-03-24	
Dorothy M. Reeder	American librarian, Directrice of The American Library in Paris (1936-1941)	1902-06-21	1957-03-15	
Dorothy Mary Neal White	Librarian, writer - New Zealand	1915	1995-02-12	
Dorothy Shea	Australian librarian, Librarian of the Supreme Court of Tasmania (1988–2016)	1941-04-25	2024-01-05	
Edith Ditmas	British archivist, historian, writer	1896	1986-02-28	
Edith Guerrier	American librarian	1870	1958	
Edwina Whitney	American librarian	1868-02-26	1970-09-03	
Effie Louise Power	American librarian	1873-02-12	1969-10-08	
Effie Morris		1921-04-20	2009-11-09	
Eileen Colwell	British librarian	1904-06-16	2002-09-17	
Eintou Pearl Springer	Trinidad and Tobago writer	1944-11-24		
Elaine Didier	American, director of Ford library and museum	1948-01-01		
Elaine Svenonius	American librarian	1933-01-09		
Eleanor Estes	American children's writer	1906-05-09	1988-07-15	
Electra Collins Doren		1861	1927	
Elena Dabija	Moldovan librarian and activist			
Eleonora Fonseca Pimentel	Royal librarian to the Queen of Naples in 1797	1752-01-13	1799-08-20	
Eliza Atkins Gleason	African-American librarian	1909-12-15	2009-12-15	
Elizabeth Futas	American librarian	1944-05-08	1995-02-06	
Elizabeth Gould Davis	American writer	1910	1974	
Elizabeth H. West	American librarian	1873-03-23	1948-01-04	
Elizabeth Heaps	British librarian			
Elizabeth Jennings	British librarian, poet	1926-07-02	2001-01-25	
Elizabeth Lee Bloomstein	American history professor, university librarian, club woman, and suffragist	1859-01-08	1927-01-02	
Elizabeth Nesbitt	American librarian, library science educator and author of children's books	1897-04-15	1977-08-17	
Elizabeth Smither	New Zealand poet	1941-09-15		
Ella Gaines Yates	American librarian	1927	2006	
Emily Wheelock Reed	American librarian	1910	2000-05-19	
Ena Noël	Australian teacher, librarian	1910	2003	
Enid Kent	American actress	1945-01-14		
Ethelwyn Manning	American librarian	1885-11-23	1972-06-01	
Éva Circé-Côté	Canadian journalist	1871	1949-05-04	
Eva Verona	Croatian librarian and information scientist	1905-02-01	1996-05-19	
Fiona Kelleghan	American writer	1965-04-21		
Flora Belle Ludington	American librarian and author	1898-11-12	1967-03	
Florence Mendheim	American librarian	1899	1984	
Florence Ward Stiles	American architect and librarian	1897	1981	
Frances Clarke Sayers	American librarian	1897-09-04	1989-06-24	
Frances E. Henne	American librarian	1906-10-11	1985-12-21	
Frances Lander Spain	American librarian	1903-03-15	1999-01-20	
Frances Wood	English historian and sinologist	1948		
Francess Lantz	American writer	1952-08-27	2004-11-22	
Fríða Á. Sigurðardóttir	Icelandic writer	1940-12-10	2010-05-07	
Gene Joseph	Wet'suwet'en Nadleh'dena First Nations librarian			
Gerdina Hendrika Kurtz	Dutch writer	1899-11-15	1989-12-17	
Gertrude Kayaga Mulindwa	Ugandan librarian	1952		
Gloria Pérez-Salmerón	Spanish librarian	1958-04-05		
Gloriana St. Clair	American librarian	1939		
Grace Perrier	Australian librarian	1875	1979	
Gratia Countryman	American librarian	1866-11-26	1953-07-26	
Greta Linder	Swedish librarian	1888-05-15	1963-10-19	
Gretchen McCord	American librarian and lawyer specialising in copyright issues in libraries			
Gunilla Herdenberg	Swedish librarian	1956-02-18		
Gwendolyn Cruzat	American medical Librarian			
Hannah Atkins	American politician	1923-11-01	2010-06-17	
Hannah Packard James	American librarian	1835	1903	
Hannah Logasa	American librarian	1879	1967	
Harriet Klausner	American book reviewer	1952-05-20	2015-10-15	
Helaine Selin	American librarian	1946		
Helen E. Haines	American librarian	1872	1961	
Helen Ganser	American librarian	1891	1990	
Helen MacInnes	20th-century Scottish-American author and librarian	1907-10-07	1985-09-20	
Helen Marot	American librarian and workers' rights activist	1865-06-09	1940-06-03	
Helen Sanger	American librarian	1923-09-21	2020-07-20	
Helen Thornton Geer	American librarian	1903-01-07	1983	
Helen Wallis	British maritime historian	1924-08-17	1995-02-07	
Helena Asamoah-Hassan	Ghanaian librarian	1950s		
Helga Josephine Zinnbauer	Australian community worker and librarian	1909-02-24	1980-12-16	
Henrietta M. Smith	American academic, children's librarian	1922-05-02	2021-04-21	
Henriette Avram	American computer programmer and system analyst; developed the MARC formatting used in libraries	1919-10-07	2006-04-22	
Hilari Bell	American writer and librarian	1958		
Ida Leeson	Australian librarian	1885-02-11	1964-01-22	
Ilona Hubay	Hungarian librarian	1902-07-01	1982-06-20	
Ina Coolbrith	American poet, writer, and librarian	1841-03-10	1928-02-29	
Inezita Barroso	Brazilian singer-songwriter	1925-03-04	2015-03-08	
Ingetraut Dahlberg	German philosopher, information scientist and librarian	1927-02-20	2017-10-24	
Ingrid Parent	Canadian librarian			
Iris Falcam	Federated States of Micronesia librarian	1938-08-25	2010-02-19	
Isadore Gilbert Mudge	American librarian	1875-03-14	1957-05-16	
Jacqueline Sturm	New Zealand poet	1927-05-17	2009-12-30	
Jane, Lady Roberts	British librarian	1949-09-04	2021-06-29	
Janet Backhouse	English scholar	1938-02-08	2004-11-03	
Janet Brennan Croft	American academic and writer	1961		
Janet Doe	American medical librarian	1895-04-11	1985-11-17	
Janet M. Suzuki	American librarian	1943	1987	
Jean Armour Polly	American librarian			
Jean Arnot	Australian librarian, trade unionist and feminist	1903-04-23	1995-09-27	
Jean Chandler Smith	American librarian	1918	1999	
Jean Lisette Aroeste	American screenwriter	1932-10-02	2020-08	
Jeannette Howard Foster	American writer	1895-11-03	1981-07-26	
Jeannette Throckmorton	American physician; medical librarian	1883-01-26	1963-07-22	
Jeltje van Nieuwenhoven	Dutch politician and librarian	1943-08-02		
Jessamyn West	American librarian	1968-09-05		
Jo Giæver Tenfjord	Children's writer	1918-08-13	2007-06-12	
Joan Airoldi	American librarian			
Joan Mondale	Second Lady of the United States from 1977 until 1981	1930-08-08	2014-02-03	
Joana Raspall i Juanola	Spanish poet	1913-07-01	2013-12-04	
Joanna Cole	American children's books author	1944-08-11	2020-07-12	
Josephine Phelan	Writer and librarian	1905	1979	
Joyce Fardell	Australian teacher librarian and advocate for children's literature	1923	2007	
Juana Capdevielle	Spanish educator and librarian	1905-08-12	1936-08-18	
Judith Hoffberg	American art curator	1934	2009-01-16	
Judith Krug	Librarian and freedom of speech proponent	1940-03-15	2009-04-11	
Judith Nadler	American librarian			
Judy Yung	American academic	1946-01-25	2020-12-14	
Julia Nicol	South African librarian	1956	2019	
Julia Sauer	American children's writer	1891-04-08	1983-06-26	
Juliane Koepcke	Biologist and sole survivor of LANSA Flight 508	1954-10-10		
Juliet Barker	British historian	1958		
Juliette Hampton Morgan	American librarian	1914-02-21	1957-07-16	
Kari Gjesteby	Norwegian politician	1947-05-16		
Kate Steinitz	American art historian	1889-08-02	1975-04-07	
Katharine L Sharp	American writer	1865-05-25	1914-06-01	
Katherine Lines	British writer	1902-09-24	1988-12-24	
Kathleen de la Peña McCook	American librarian			
Kathleen Nunneley	New Zealand tennis player	1872-09-16	1956-09-28	
Kathleen Seidel	American blogger			
Kirsten Engelstad	Norwegian librarian	1940-03-11		
Kristiina Kolehmainen	Finnish librarian	1956-11-21	2012-03-27	
Laura Amy Schlitz	American children's author	1955-05-28		
Laura Bush	First Lady of the United States from 2001 to 2009	1946-11-04		
Laura Quilter	American feminist	1968-10-01		
Leaonead Pack Drain-Bailey	American librarian	1906-01-28	1983-03-29	
Letitia Dunbar-Harrison	Irish librarian	1906-02-04	1994	
Lillian H. Smith	Canadian children's librarian	1887-03-17	1983-01-05	
Linda Eastman	American librarian	1867	1963	
Linnie Marsh Wolfe	American librarian	1881-01-08	1945-09-15	
Lois Blount	American teacher, historian, librarian and museum curator	1896-05-24	1980-09-02	
Lois Mai Chan	American librarian, author, and professor	1934-07	2014-08-20	
Loleta Fyan	American librarian	1894-05-14	1990-03-15	
Loriene Roy	American librarian			
Lotsee Patterson	American librarian	1931		
Louise Noëlle Malclès	French bibliographer and librarian	1899-09-20	1977-03-27	
Louise S. Robbins	American historian			
Lucile M. Morsch	Librarian	1906-01-21	1972-07-03	
Lucy Toulmin Smith	Anglo-American antiquarian scholar and librarian	1838-11-21	1911-12-18	
Luraine Tansey	American librarian	1918-01-29	2014-06-18	
Lynne Brindley	British professional librarian	1950-07-02		
Lynne M. Thomas	American librarian and editor	1974		
Madeleine Laurain-Portemer	French librarian	1917-06-07	1996-08-15	
Mamah Borthwick	American translator	1869-06-19	1914-08-15	
Marcia C. Noyes	American medical librarian	1869	1946	
Margaret A. Edwards	American librarian	1902-10-23	1988-04-19	
Margaret Alington	Historian	1920-09-30	2012-10-15	
Margaret Cross Norton	First Illinois State Archivist	1891-07-07	1984-05-21	
Margaret Elizabeth Egan	American librarian	1905-03-14	1959-01-26	
Margaret Hayes Grazier	American librarian	1916-12-19	1999-07-09	
Margaret Herrick	American librarian	1902-09-27	1976-06-21	
Margaret Mahy	New Zealand children's writer	1936-03-21	2012-07-23	
Margaret Mann	American pioneer in the field of library science, faculty at University of Michigan from 1926 to 1938, where she was a founding faculty member in the department of library science.	1873-04-09	1960-08-22	
Margaret Ridley Charlton	Canadian librarian	1858	1931-05-31	
Margaret Scoggin	American librarian	1905-04-14	1968-07-11	
Margaret Windeyer	Australian librarian and feminist	1866-11-24	1939-08-11	
Margaret Hutchins	American librarian and professor at Columbia University	1884-09-21	1961-01-04	
Margareta Bergman	Swedish novelist	1922-08-22	2006-09-27	
Maria Limanskaya	Russian librarian and military police	1924-04-12	2024-11-25	
Maria Luisa Monteiro da Cunha	Brazilian librarian	1908-09-14	1980-07-28	
Maria Mitchell	American astronomer	1818-08-01	1889-06-28	
María Moliner	Spanish lexicographer	1900-03-30	1981-01-21	
Maria Verger		1892	1983	
Marianne Scott	Canadian librarian	1928-12-04		
Marilla Waite Freeman	American librarian	1871-02-21	1961-10-29	
Marjorie Barnard	Australian novelist and short story writer, critic and historian	1897-08-16	1987-05-08	
Marjorie Cotton	Australian librarian	1913	2003-02-02	
Martha B. Gould	American librarian			
Martha Larsen Jahn	Norwegian politician	1875-04-17	1954-08-02	
Martha P. Cotera	Mexican feminist	1938-01-17		
Mary A. Kingsbury	American school library pioneer	1865-07-03	1958-08-16	
Mary Ann Shaffer	United States writer, editor and bookshop worker	1934-12-13	2008-02-16	
Mary Emma Griffith Marshall	American editor and librarian at the U.S. Department of Agriculture	1888-08-10	1925-07-25	
Mary Brunner	American academic and convicted criminal	1943-12-17		
Mary Caffrey Low	American librarian and educator	1850	1926-03-04	
Mary Cutler Fairchild	American librarian	1855	1921	
Mary Eileen Ahern	American librarian, a leader of the modern library movement, and an early organizer of libraries in the United States	1860-10-01	1938-05-22	
Mary Elizabeth Wood	American librarian and missionary in China	1861-08-22	1931-05-01	
Mary Ellinor Lucy Archer	Australian librarian	1893-11-13	1979-05-03	
Mary Emma Allison	American school librarian who co-created Trick-or-Treat for UNICEF in 1950	1917-03-05	2010-10-27	
Mary Foy	American librarian	1862-07-13	1962-02-21	
Mary Frances Isom	American librarian	1865-02-27	1920-04-15	
Mary Greig Campbell	New Zealand librarian and Quaker	1907-11-17	1989-04-22	
Mary Josephine Booth	American librarian	1876	1965	
Mary Lemist Titcomb	American librarian	1852	1932	
Mary Letitia Jones	American librarian	1865		
Mary Myrtle Tye	American medical librarian	1886	1933	
Mary O. Kryszak	American politician	1875-07-27	1945-07-16	
Mary Peacock Douglas	American librarian and author	1903-02-08	1970-01-29	
Mary Swan	Canadian writer			
Mary Virginia Gaver	American librarian	1906-12-10	1991-12-31	
Mary Wright Plummer	American librarian, former president of the American Library Association	1856-03-08	1916-09-21	
Matilda Cooke Maltby	American librarian	1841-12-01	1912-03-25	
Maud Durlin Sullivan	American public librarian	1870-12-07	1943-12-28	
Maxine Bell	American librarian, politician	1931-08-06		
May Hill Arbuthnot	American educator and writer	1884-08-27	1969-10-02	
Mayme Agnew Clayton	American librarian	1923-08-04	2006-10-13	
Mercè Canela	Spanish translator and writer	1956		
Meredith Ann Pierce	American writer	1958-07-05		
Michelle P. Brown	British academic			
Michelle Zaffino	American writer	1972-09-13		
Milagros del Corral	Spanish librarian	1945		
Mildred L. Batchelder	American librarian	1901-09-07	1998-08-25	
Mildred M. Jordan	American medical librarian		1965-10-07	
Minnie Earl Sears	American librarian	1873-11-17	1933-11-28	
Miriam Braverman	American librarian	1920	2002	
Miriam Lichtheim	Israeli Egyptologist	1914-05-03	2004-03-27	
Misty Massey	American writer			
Mollie Huston Lee	American librarian	1907-01-18	1982-01-26	
Mollie Lukis	Australian archivist and women's rights activist	1912-08-13	2009-08-01	
Nadezhda Krupskaya	Russian revolutionary and politician	1869-02-26	1939-02-27	
Nancy Pearl	American librarian and writer	1945-01-12		
Natalie Ceeney	British businessperson	1971-08-22		
Natalya Gorbanevskaya	Russian poet, translator, and civil rights activist	1936-05-26	2013-11-29	
Nella Larsen	American novelist, librarian, nurse	1891-04-13	1964-03-30	
Nita Kibble	Australian librarian	1879	1962-02-04	
Noémi-Noire Oursel	Librarian and biographer	1847-10-15	1901s	
Nola Leigh Millar	Librarian, theatre director, critic and administrator	1913-02-18	1974-01-20	
Nora Niland	Irish librarian	1913-03-26	1988-12-29	
Noushafarin Ansari	Iranian scholar	1939		
Olinta Ariosa Morales	Cuban librarian	1921	1999	
Ona Šimaitė	Lithuanian librarian, activist, and Holocaust survivor	1894-01-06	1970-01-17	
Paloma Efron	Argentine radio and television journalist and jazz singer	1912	1977-09-03	
Pamela Darling	American librarian	1943		
Pamela Morsi	American writer of romance novels	1951-03-12	2024-12-14	
Parvin E'tesami	Iranian poet	1907-03-16	1941-04-05	
Pat Southern	Roman historian	1948-06-22		
Patricia Battin	American librarian, first president of Commission on Preservation and Access	1929-06-02	2019-04-22	
Patricia Swift Blalock	American librarian and human rights activist	1914-05-09	2011-09-07	
Peggy Sullivan	American librarian			
Phyllis Richmond	Amerinan librarian and historian of science	1921	1997-10-06	
Prudenciana Cruz	Filipino librarian	1943-05-19		
Pura Belpré	Puerto Rican librarian and writer	1899-02-02	1982	
Regina M. Anderson	African-American playwright and librarian. She was of Native American, Jewish, East Indian, Swedish, and other European ancestry	1901-05-21	1993-02-05	
Ricarda Huch	German writer	1864-07-18	1947-11-17	
Róisín Walsh	Dublin's first chief librarian	1889-03-24	1949-06-25	
Rodica Avasiloaie	Moldavan writer	1949-04-02		
Rosa Leveroni	Spanish poet	1910	1985; 1985-08-04	
Rosa M. Abella	Cuban exile	1920-02-13	2007-04-02	
Ruth Bolden	American activist	1910	2004	
Ruth Brown	American librarian	1891-07-26	1975	
Ruth Edna Kelley	American librarian	1893-04-08	1982-03-04	
Ruth France	New Zealand librarian, poet and novelist	1913-06-12	1968-08-19	
Ruth Gay	Jewish writer	1922; 1922-10-19	2006; 2006-05-09	
Ruth Rappaport	American librarian	1923-05-27	2010	
Ruth Savord	American librarian	1894-11-02	1966-02-25	
Ruth W. Brown	American librarian	1891-07-26	1975	
Sadie Peterson Delaney	American librarian	1889-02-26	1958-05-04	
Sara Myers	American librarian			
Sara Ryan	American writer	1971		
Sara Mahan	American politician	1870-02-26	1966-11-01	
Sarah B. Askew	American public librarian	1877-02-15	1942-10-20	
Sarah C.N. Bogle	American librarian	1870-11-17	1932-01-11	
Sarah Rees Brennan	Irish children's writer	1983-09-21		
Sarah Thomas	American librarian			
Sarah Tyacke	British historian and archivist	1945-09-29		
Saša Vegri	Slovene poet	1934-02-12	2010-08-29	
Shanti Mishra	Nepalese librarian, writer, lecturer	1938-06-22	2019-05-15	
Shirley Barker	American writer	1911-04-04	1965-11-18	
Sister Gregory Kirkus	English Roman Catholic nun, academic	1910-11-09	2007-08-30	
Sorche Nic Leodhas	American children's writer	1898	1969	
Susan Patron	American children's book author	1948	2023-10-24	
Susan T. Sommer	American librarian	1935-01-07	2008-03-04	
Susan Whitfield	English historian			
Suzanne Briet	French librarian	1894-02-01	1989-02-13	
Suzy Covey	American comic book scholar	1939-10-27	2007-10-17	
Sylvia Arthur	Ghanaian literary curator			
Tatjana Aparac-Jelušić	Croatian librarian	1948-07-10		
Teresa Andrés Zamora	Spanish librarian	1907	1946-07-05	
Tessa Kelso	American librarian	1863	1933	
Thea Schmitz	Australian librarian	1927	1990	
Thea White	American actress	1940-06-15	2021-07-31	
Theodora Kimball Hubbard	American librarian	1887	1935	
Theresa Breslin	Scottish children's writer	1947		
Theresa Elmendorf	American librarian	1855-11-01	1932-09-04	
Valborg Platou	Norwegian librarian	1839-08-29	1928-12-29	
Valentine Britten	British librarian			
Valfrid Palmgren	Swedish politician	1877-06-03	1967-12-06	
Vera MacLeavy	Archivist of the Moravian Church in Jamaica 1957–1986	1919-09-25	2008-07-20	
Vera Osoianu	Moldovan writer	1949-04-02		
Vicki Myron	American writer	1947		
Virginia Haviland	American librarian and writer	1911-05-21	1988-01-06	
Virginia Lacy Jones	American librarian	1912-06-25	1984-12-03	
Virginia Proctor Powell Florence	American historian	1897-10-01	1991	
Vivian G. Harsh	American librarian: archivist, creator of the Vivian G. Harsh Collection of African American History at the Chicago Public Library	1890-05-27	1960-08-17	
Wenche Blomberg	Norwegian children's writer	1943-06-23	2023-10-27	
Wilhelmina Sherriff Bain	New Zealand teacher, librarian, feminist, peace activist and writer	1848-09-05	1944-01-26	
Willye Dennis	American politician in Florida	1926-03-14	2012-03-09	
Winarti Partaningrat	Indonesian government official	1922-09-21	1978-05-08	
Yolanda Retter	American activist	1948	2007-08-18	
Yvonne Dionne	first-born of the Dionne quintuplets, five identical sisters	1934-05-28	2001-06-23	
Yvonne Oddon	French resistance member	1902-06-18	1982-09-07	
Zoia Horn	American librarian	1908-03-14	2014-07-12	
Gladys Hansen	American librarian and archivist, an expert on the 1906 San Francisco earthquake	1925	2017-03-05	

== \See also ==
- List of librarians
- List of female archivists
- Lists of women
