= Academy school (disambiguation) =

An academy school is type of school in the English education system.

Academy School may also refer to:

- The Academy School, a prep school in Hampstead, London
- Academy School, Glastonbury, Connecticut, United States, a former school
