= Heather Lyke =

American sports administrator

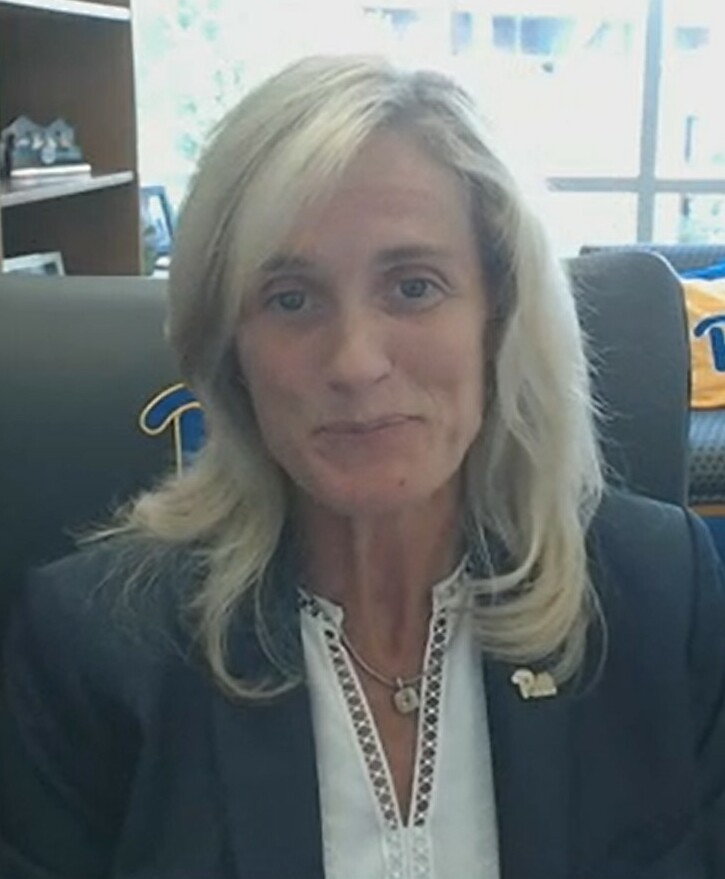
- Lyke in 2020

Current position
- Title: Consultant
- Team: Huron Consulting Group

Biographical details
- Born: October 19, 1970 (age 56); Canton, Ohio, U.S.

Playing career
- 1988–1992: Michigan

Administrative career (AD unless noted)
- 1996–1998: Cincinnati (assistant AD)
- 1998–2013: Ohio State (assistant AD)
- 2013–2017: Eastern Michigan
- 2017–2024: Pittsburgh
- 2025–: Syracuse (assistant AD)

Heather Lyke is a consultant at Huron Consulting Group where she specializes in college athletics. She previously was the athletic director at the University of Pittsburgh and Eastern Michigan University. She also served in administrative roles at Ohio State University, Syracuse University, and the University of Cincinnati.

== Career ==
Heather Lyke is an attorney who has served as an executive and professional administrator in college athletics throughout her career. In July 2025, Lyke was hired by Syracuse Athletics as a special advisor to director of athletics John Wildhack and Chancellor Kent Syverud. Prior to that she served as the Acting President and Chief Executive Officer of the FBS Athletic Directors Association. Throughout her career, Lyke has been actively engaged in leadership roles within the NCAA, ACC and numerous professional associations.

Lyke was named the director of athletics at the University of Pittsburgh in March 2017 and served in that role until 2024. During her tenure, Pittsburgh Athletics experienced a period of unprecedented multi-sport success, winning multiple Athletic Coast Conference championships across sports including football, men's soccer, softball, volleyball and wrestling. The department also expanded its historical postseason success, including multiple NCAA Final Four appearances in women's volleyball and men's soccer. They also clinched the first ever ACC football title in the 2021 ACC Football Championship Game. In wrestling, Pittsburgh produced its first national champion since 2008 in 2023. Under her leadership, the department won 11 ACC Team Championships, 18 Individual Championships. Since 2017, Pittsburgh Athletics has undergone significant coaching turnover and restructuring across its sports programs, including the hiring of multiple head coaches intended to elevate competitive performance. During this period, six coaches were named ACC Coach of the Year, significantly increasing the program's conference level honors compared to the preceding era. The department also achieved sustained academic improvement, setting multiple institutional records for NCAA Graduation Success Rate (GSR), reaching a program-best level of 93%.

Pittsburgh Athletics also significantly expanded its philanthropic support base, increasing both donor participation and total annual giving. The Panther Club donor base and annual cash contributions both increased substantially since 2017, reflecting sustained growth in external support. They created a major giving society, The Script Society, which increased the number of seven-figure commitments. Lyke also helped secure a $20 million donation to endow the head football coaching position, the largest athletic gift in the department's history at the time. Additionally, Lyke led the vision for Victory Heights which approved by Pittsburgh Board of Trustees in January 2020. Victory Heights is a series of state-of-the-art athletics projects that will provide Pitt student-athletes with national caliber competition, training and sports performance facilities. Another major change under Lyke's leadership was Pittsburgh Athletics rebranding project with NIKE. The process included new colors, secondary logos, typeface, fonts and the grand opening of the Nike Store in the Pitt Shop on Forbes Avenue.

From 2013-17, Lyke served as the Director of Athletics at Eastern Michigan University. During her tenure, athletics fundraising increased by significantly, supporting capital improvements to athletic facilities, including designing the plan for a new football endzone building that was completed shortly after her departure. Eastern Michigan teams won seventeen MAC titles during her tenure. The football program made its first bowl appearance since 1987, against Old Dominion in the 2019 Bahamas Bowl under head coach Chris Creighton.

Before becoming a Division I athletic director, Lyke spent 15 years at The Ohio State University in the Department of Athletics, where she was a member of the executive team under athletic directors Gene Smith and Andy Geiger. Her responsibilities included sport administration, sport performance and leading the development of the department's strategic plan, – A Higher Purpose. During this time, Lyke also worked as a color analyst for softball broadcasts on the Big Ten Network.

Early in her career, Lyke worked in the athletic compliance office at the University of Cincinnati and began her career in college athletics as an intern with the NCAA.

== Title IX Lawsuit ==
In February 2026, Lyke was named in a Title IX lawsuit filed by six former players on the Pittsburgh women's basketball team against coach Tory Verdi and the school over allegations of abusive coaching methods and a failure to investigate the reports of abuse. The lawsuit claims that players and staff repeatedly brought concerns about Coach Verdi's behavior to senior administrators, specifically naming Lyke and two other senior administrators, and that despite this notice, Lyke and her team took no corrective action, allowing a "hostile, discriminatory, and retaliatory environment" to persist. The lawsuit also notes that Lyke hired Verdi in 2023 based on their prior relationship at Eastern Michigan.

== Education and early career ==
Lyke was born and raised in Canton, Ohio. She earned her bachelor's degree from the University of Michigan in 1992, where she was a four-year member of the Michigan Wolverines softball team playing under head coach Carol "Hutch" Hutchins. Lyke served as captain and played first base on the 1992 Big Ten Championship Team.

She later earned a Juris Doctor degree from the University of Akron School of Law in 1995 and subsequently passed the Ohio Bar Examination.

== Boards and recognition ==
Lyke has served on several NCAA national committees including the NCAA Division I Council (2019-23), the NCAA Division I Football Oversight Committee (2021-2024; Chair in 2023 and 2024), and the NCAA Men's Lacrosse Selection Committee (2011-2014; Chair in 2014).

In July 2020 Lyke testified before the United States Senate Judiciary Committee on gambling, highlighting the risks of wagering on college athletics and advocating for the protection of student-athletes and the integrity of college athletics.

Lyke has served on numerous boards throughout her career, including National Association of Collegiate Directors of Athletics (NACDA),LEAD1 Association, and as President of Women Leaders in Sports.

In 2023, Lyke served at the Chair of the ACC Directors of Athletics in 2023. While in Pittsburgh, she also served as a Board member for the UPMC Hillman Cancer Center and Pittsburgh Three Rivers Marathon. She currently serves on the Board of Directors of the Pro Football Hall of Fame.

Lyke was named the 2023 NACDA Athletic Director of the Year honor [3]. She was also a finalist for the Sports Business Journal Athletic Director of the Year award in 2023. In addition, Lyke received the Dapper Dan Sportswoman of the Year award in 2019 and was honored as a Women of Achievement recipient in Pittsburgh. She was a candidate for the Sports Business Journal Athletic Director of the Year in 2023 Additionally, Lyke was awarded the Dapper Dan Sportswoman of the Year in 2019 and Women of Achievement honor in Pittsburgh.
