= Jean Smith =

Jean Smith may refer to:

- Jean Smith (baseball) (1928–2011), American baseball player
- Jean Edward Smith (1932–2019), American biographer and academic
- Jean Kennedy Smith (1928–2020), American diplomat
- Jean Chandler Smith (1918–1999), American librarian and bibliographer
- Jean Smith (singer) (born 1959), Canadian musician
- Jean Smith (rugby union) (born 2003), South African rugby union player

== See also ==
- Gene Smith (disambiguation)
