= Zaffino =

Zaffino is a surname. Notable people with the surname include:

- Jorge Zaffino (1959–2002), Argentine comic book artis born in Argentina
- Michelle Zaffino, American author
- Peter Zaffino (born 1967), American insurance industry executive
