= Maltby =

Maltby may refer to:

== Places ==
- Maltby le Marsh, Lincolnshire, England
- Maltby Lakes, West Haven, Connecticut
- Maltby, Lincolnshire, England, near Louth
- Maltby, North Yorkshire, England, near Middlesbrough
- Maltby, South Yorkshire, England, near Rotherham
- Maltby, Washington, USA

== Other uses ==
- Maltby (surname)

== See also ==
- The Maltby Collection, BBC Radio 4 series
