= Eugene Smith =

Eugene Smith may refer to:

- Eugene Allen Smith (1841–1927), American geologist
- Eugene Allison Smith (1922-1980), American politician and farmer
- Eugene P. Smith (1871–1918), American sailor and Medal of Honor recipient
- Victor Smith (footballer, born 1878) (Eugene Victor Charles Smith, 1878–1951), English footballer
- W. Eugene Smith (1918–1978), American photojournalist
- Eugene Smith (aviator) (1918–2012), American Tuskegee Airman and attorney
- Eugene Smith (baseball) (1916–2011), American baseball pitcher
- Eugene Smith (singer) (1921–2009), American gospel singer and composer
- Eugene Owen Smith (1929–2012), American biographer
- L. Eugene Smith (1921–2019), American politician, member of the Pennsylvania House of Representatives
- Geno Smith (born 1990), American football quarterback
- Kenneth Eugene Smith (1965–2024), American criminal, first person to be executed by nitrogen hypoxia

== See also ==
- Gene Smith (disambiguation)
