= Maltby (surname) =

Maltby is an English surname. Notable people with the surname include:

- Alfred Maltby (c.1842–1901), English actor and playwright
- Arnold Maltby (1913–2003), Australian rules footballer
- Brough Maltby (1826–1894), English archdeacon
- Christopher Maltby (1891–1980), British army officer
- David Maltby (1920–1943), British bomber pilot
- Edward Maltby (1770–1859), English bishop
- Edward Maltby (British civil servant) (1811–1889), British colonial administrator
- George Maltby (1876–1924), English cricketer
- Henry Maltby (c.1818–1869), English cricketer
- H. F. Maltby (1880–1963), British actor and writer
- Jackie Maltby (born 1939), English footballer
- Jake Maltby (born 2000), English footballer
- Jasper A. Maltby (1826–1867), American army general
- John Maltby (1936–2020), British painter and ceramics maker
- Judith Maltby (born 1957), American priest and church historian
- Kirk Maltby (born 1972), Canadian ice hockey player
- Lauren Maltby (born 1984), American actress and psychologist
- Lorraine Maltby (born 1960), British biologist
- Lucy M. Maltby (1900–1984), American home economics educator
- Margaret Eliza Maltby (1860–1944), American physicist
- Matilda Cooke Maltby (1841–1912), American librarian
- Norman Maltby (born 1951), English cricketer
- Paul Maltby (1892–1971), British Royal Air Force officer
- Peg Maltby (1899–1984), English-born Australian book illustrator and children's writer
- Per Maltby (1933–2006), Norwegian astronomer
- Rachel Maltby (born 2007), English footballer
- Richard Maltby, Sr. (1914–1991), American musician and bandleader
- Richard Maltby, Jr. (born 1937), American theatre director and lyricist
- Sarah Maltby, Manx politician
- Thomas Maltby (1890–1976), Australian politician
- William Maltby (1763–1854), English solicitor, librarian and bibliographer
