= Barbara Tillett =

American librarian

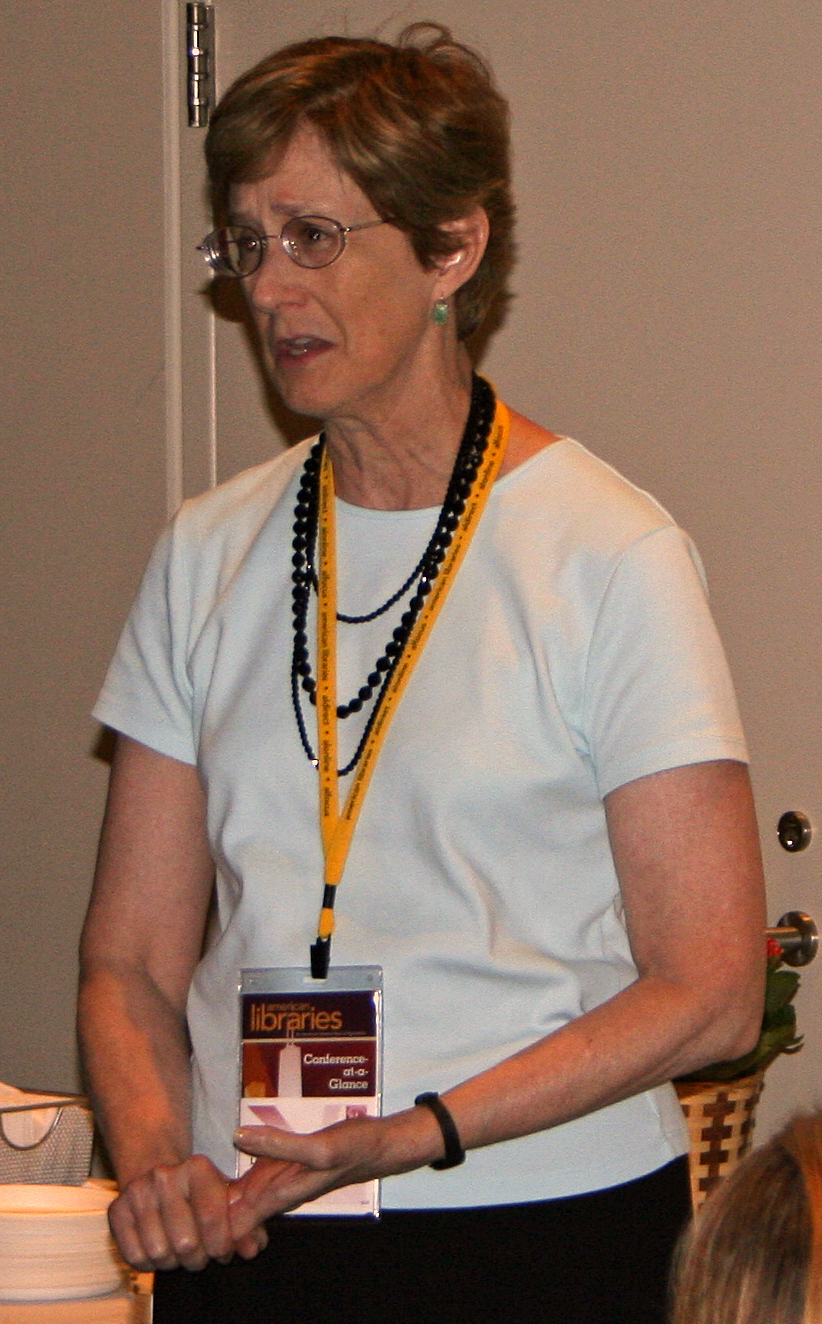
- Born: 29 September 1946
- Occupation: Librarian
- Awards: Margaret Mann Citation (2004); Frederick G. Kilgour Award for Research in Library and Information Technology (2013); Ross Atkinson Lifetime Achievement Award (2013)

Barbara Ann Barnett Tillett (born 1946) is a librarian and library scholar known for her work on authority control and bibliographic data modeling.

== Library of Congress ==
Tillett began working at the Library of Congress in 1994. As director of the Library's Integrated Library System (ILS) Program from August 1997 through July 2001, Tillett undertook the massive task of leading the selection and implementation of the Library of Congress' first Integrated Library System. A library press release referred to the project as the "largest single information technology project in the Library's history."

Tillett served as chief of the Library's Cataloging Policy & Support Office, which sometimes put her into conflict with Sanford Berman's subject heading activism.

Tillett retired from the Library of Congress on November 30, 2012.

== Cataloging theory ==
Tillett has been particularly well known for her development and explanation of the Functional Requirements for Bibliographic Records (FRBR) model. Tillett served as a consultant to the IFLA Study Group on the Functional Requirements for Bibliographic Records, which developed the model. She has also been highly involved in the development of RDA, a cataloging code based on the FRBR model. Tillett served on the Joint Steering Committee for the Development of RDA between 1994 and 2012, and served as the committee's chair between 2011 and 2013.

== Recognition ==
Tillett has received numerous awards for her scholarship and work with the Library of Congress, including the ALCTS Margaret Mann Citation, the Library of Congress' Distinguished Service Award and Flemming Award, and the Ross Atkinson Lifetime Achievement Award. In both 2005 and 2007, she was awarded the best paper of the year by the journal Cataloging & Classification Quarterly.

== Publications ==
- "Bibliographic relationships : toward a conceptual structure of bibliographic information used in cataloging" (1987, PhD thesis)
- "Authority control in the online environment : considerations and practices" (Haworth Press, 1989)
- "What is FRBR? A Conceptual Model for the Bibliographic Universe" (2003)
- "The bibliographic universe and the new IFLA cataloging principles" with Carlo Bianchini (Casalini libri, 2008)
