= Society of Environmental Toxicology and Chemistry =

International organization

The Society of Environmental Toxicology and Chemistry (SETAC) is an international environmental toxicology and environmental chemistry organization.

== History ==
It was set up to allow interdisciplinary communication between environmental scientists around the world. It was founded in 1979 in North America.

== Function ==
SETAC promotes environmental sciences through conducting meetings, workshops, and symposia; bestowing awards recognizing for excellence; promoting education in the field by organizing training courses and supporting students; and through its publication program. It holds meetings and events around the world. It produces two scientific journals; Environmental Toxicology and Chemistry (ET&C), which it has produced since 1982, originally yearly and then monthly from 1986; and Integrated Environmental Assessment and Management (IEAM). It also produces online books and easy to read Technical Issue Papers and Science Briefs, which are publicly available.

== See also ==
- European Association of Geochemistry
