= Eva Verona =

Croatian librarian

- Born: February 1, 1905; Trieste, Austria-Hungary (present-day Trieste, Italy)
- Died: May 19, 1996 (aged 91); Zagreb, Croatia
- Education: University of Zagreb
- Scientific career
- Fields: Information Science
- Workplaces: University of Zagreb

Eva Verona (February 1, 1905 – May 19, 1996) was the most eminent Croatian librarian and information scientist and is well known among information scientists around the world.

She was born in Trieste (now Italy, then Austro-Hungarian Empire) in 1905. Her early childhood was spent in Vienna and eventually moved to Zagreb, Croatia where she attended grammar school. She graduated with a degree in mathematics and physics from Zagreb University in 1928 and was immediately employed in the National and University Library in Zagreb. She worked in different departments of the Library as her career progressed. She reorganized the natural sciences section in the classified catalogue and also worked on the foreign periodicals collection. She also was in charge of choosing and purchasing works dealing with the natural sciences, technology, and librarianship. Verona remained at the University Library until retiring in 1967. Starting in 1968 she was a professor at the University of Zagreb for students of librarianship.

She was also active in the library journal Vjesnik bibliotekara Hrvatske and in the Croatian Encyclopedia, for which she wrote numerous works about the history of Croatian libraries. Verona served as the journal's editor-in-chief from 1960 to 1965. She also took part in the Croatian Library Association.

In the fifties, Verona's focus switched to the theory of alphabetical catalogues. She published multiple papers on this subject, and soon became the leading international expert. Her papers published in "Vjesnik bibliotekara Hrvatske", "Libri", and "Library Resources and Technical Services" examined her comparisons of different approaches practiced by individual foreign catalogues and cataloging codes in cataloging anonymous works and corporate headings. She also studied the history of these cataloging practices. Using her experience in cataloguing rules she wrote Cataloguing Code, published in 1970 and 1983.

The IFLA Committee on Cataloguing noted Verona's contribution in 1954 at its meeting in Zagreb. She became known and accepted by the International library community and in 1961 played an important part in the International Conference on Cataloguing Principles in Paris.

Verona served as both a member of the Consulting Committee of the International Committee of Bibliographic Control and as the chairperson of the IFLA's Section for cataloguing from 1974 to 1977. During this three-year period, she wrote a critical study on corporate headings, in which she compared the use of corporate headings in diverse catalogues and national biographies.

Eva Verona will be remembered by generations of her students for her logic and consistent thought, exquisite politeness, and generosity in transmitting her ample knowledge. In addition to her many other accomplishments, she also was the first European librarian to receive the American Library Association's Margaret Mann Citation in 1976 and was the first person to be awarded a PhD in the librarianship by the University of Zagreb. Since 1998, the Croatian Library Association presents the Eva Verona Award for "outstanding dedication to work, innovative practice and promotion of library profession". Upon her death in 1996, library journals around the world published obituaries and celebrated the life of Croatia's most influential librarian.
