= Mary A. Kingsbury =

American school library pioneer (1865–1958)

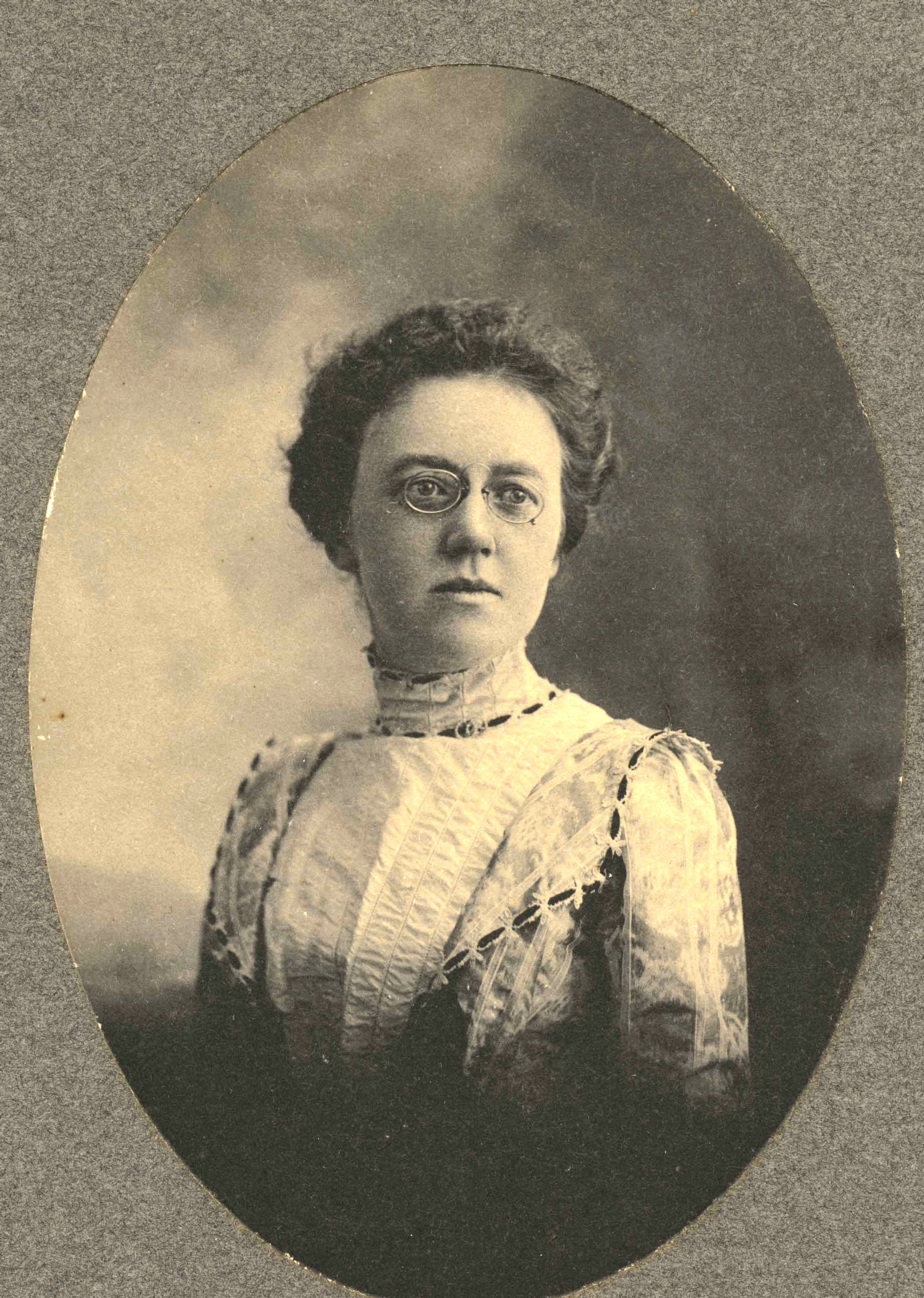
Mary A. Kingsbury

Mary Aurelia Kingsbury (July 3, 1865 – August 16, 1958) was an American school library pioneer. In 1900, she became the first professionally trained school Librarian in American history when she was appointed as a librarian of the Erasmus Hall High School of Brooklyn, New York City.

== Biography ==
Born as Mary Aurelia Kingsbury on July 3, 1865, in Glastonbury, Connecticut, United States, Mary A. Kingsbury was the daughter of Daniel Kingsbury, a doctor, and his second wife, Lucy M.Cone. She completed her school education at the Glastonbury Free Academy (GFA). She continued her higher studies at the Smith College in Massachusetts.

She began her professional career as a teacher at the Glastonbury Free Academy, where she taught Latin, arithmetic, geography, and zoology. She worked at GFA from 1890 to 1894. In 1891, along with her sister, she started a public library in GFA.

To improve her language skills, she traveled to Germany for a year to study language. She took ten private lessons in German under Frau Dr.Hempel, who had also taught Mark Twain. After returning to the United States, she continued her teaching career. She taught English and German in a private school for girls in Tarrytown, New York, from 1895 to 1898.

She later gave up teaching and enrolled at the Pratt Institute Library School, where she graduated in 1899. After her graduation, she cataloged the Greek and Latin texts at the libraries of the University of Pennsylvania and the American Society of Civil Engineers.

She passed the first examination ever given by the New York Board of Education for the position of librarian. She was later recommended for the newly created position of librarian at the Erasmus Hall Academy in Brooklyn. With this appointment, she became the first professionally trained librarian to be employed full time in a school in the United States for an annual salary of $ 600.

She retired in 1931 after her vision became impaired, completing a forty years of service as a librarian at the Erasmus Hall Academy. She returned to Glastonbury, Connecticut, and stayed with her sister. She was associated with a number of professional associations including the Connecticut School Library Association and American Association of School Librarians.

She died on August 16, 1958, at the age of 93.
