= Mildred M. Jordan =

American medical librarian

Mildred M. Jordan

Mildred McMillan Jordan (died October 7, 1965) was an American medical librarian. She was the second director of the A.W. Calhoun Medical Library of Emory University, which was later merged into the Woodruff Health Sciences Center Library. She developed the second ever academic course in medical librarianship and was Professor of Medical Bibliography in the Emory University School of Medicine. Her involvement in the Medical Library Association pushed the field of medical librarianship to become professionalized and credentialed.

== Early life and education ==
Jordan was born in Hartsville, South Carolina. She graduated from Winthrop College with a degree in library science and attained a master's degree in history from Emory University.

== Career ==
Jordan joined the Medical Library Association in 1932 when she was assistant librarian at Emory's medical library. In 1933 she took over from Mary Myrtle Tye as head of the A.W. Calhoun Medical Library.

During World War II, Jordan served as the regional director of the Army Medical Library of the United States, bringing these materials and services to the city of Atlanta.

Following the war, she also held the title of Professor of Medical Bibliography and taught a special course in medical librarianship, a field she helped develop.

== Service to the library community ==
In 1948, Jordan proposed to the Medical Library Association a process of professionalization and certification for medical librarianship, and she was involved in establishing the professional credentialing program that is now called the Academy of Health Information Professionals or AHIP.

She served as president of the Medical Library Association in 1960.

== Legacy ==
In 1965, Jordan won the Marcia C. Noyes Award, the highest professional distinction awarded by the Medical Library Association.
