= Lorraine Maltby =

British biologist and academic

Lorraine Maltby OBE FRSB
- Born: Lorraine Lucy Ward; February 1960 (age 66)
- Education: Newcastle University; University of Glasgow
- Scientific career
- Fields: Environmental biology
- Workplaces: University of Sheffield
- Thesis: Life history variation in the freshwater leech Erpobdella octoculata (1984)
- Website: www.sheffield.ac.uk/biosciences/people/academic-staff/lorraine-maltby

Lorraine Lucy Maltby (born 1960, née Ward) OBE FRSB is a British biologist and professor of environmental biology at the University of Sheffield. She serves as Deputy Vice-President for research and innovation and chair of the board of trustees of the Freshwater Habitats Trust. Her research investigates interactions in the riparian zone and the environmental impacts of agri-plastics.

== Early life and education ==
Maltby became interested in freshwater ecology during her A-Levels, where she completed a project on urban ecology. She moved to Newcastle University for an undergraduate degree in zoology. She then moved to the University of Glasgow for graduate studies, where she studied the life history of freshwater Erpobdella leeches.

== Research and career ==
Maltby was awarded a Natural Environment Research Council (NERC) postdoctoral research grant and moved to the University of Sheffield in 1984. Maltby joined the faculty at the University of Sheffield in 1988, was appointed a professor in 2004, and served as head of department in 2008. In 2017, she was appointed Deputy Vice President of Research. Her research investigates aquatic-riparian interactions and the environmental impacts of plasticulture. She has been part of the UK Research and Innovation (UKRI) activity around sustainable plastics in agriculture. She has studied chemical pollution in Yorkshire rivers. Maltby is chair of the Board of Trustees of the Freshwater Habitats Trust.

=== Awards and honours ===
- 2019 Elected Fellow of the Freshwater Biological Association
- 2020 Appointed officer of the Most Excellent Order of the British Empire (OBE) in the 2021 New Year Honours for services to Environmental Biology, Animal and Plant Sciences.

=== Selected publications ===
- Martin Dallimer; Katherine N. Irvine; Andrew M. J. Skinner; et al. (January 2012). "Biodiversity and the Feel-Good Factor: Understanding Associations between Self-Reported Human Well-being and Species Richness". BioScience. 62 (1): 47–55. doi:10.1525/bio.2012.62.1.9. ISSN 0006-3568. Wikidata Q56837867.
- Lorraine Maltby; Naomi Blake; Theo C M Brock; Paul J van den Brink (1 February 2005). "Insecticide species sensitivity distributions: importance of test species selection and relevance to aquatic ecosystems". Environmental Toxicology and Chemistry. 24 (2): 379–388. doi:10.1897/04-025r.1. ISSN 0730-7268. PMID 15719998. S2CID 8859535. Wikidata Q39208868.
- Lorraine Maltby; Sophie A Clayton; Robert M Wood; Nathan McLoughlin (1 February 2002). "Evaluation of the Gammarus pulex in situ feeding assay as a biomonitor of water quality: Robustness, responsiveness, and relevance". Environmental Toxicology and Chemistry. 21 (2): 361–368. doi:10.1002/etc.5620210219. ISSN 0730-7268. PMID 11833806. S2CID 19598556. Wikidata Q45272180.
