= Vera Osoianu =

Moldovian librarian

- Citizenship: Republic of Moldova
- Education: Moldova State University
- Occupation: Librarian
- Employer: National Library of Moldova
- Known for: Deputy director National Library of Moldova
- Awards: Order of the Star of Romania

Vera Osoianu is a librarian from Moldova. She is the deputy director of the National Library of Moldova. Vera Osoianu was awarded, by a presidential decree, with Romania's highest state decoration – the Order of the Star of Romania.

== Education ==
- IFLA Conference 2010 -Working visit Germany National Library, August, 2008 - International Conference on Informational Technologies, Yerevan, Armenia, 23–27 May 2007 -2004 International Conference "Crimea – 2004" -2003 December- stage on the base of French National Library -2003 April 5–10 Workshop on the base of Helsinky city library -2002 (August–December) CI Program, US —1999 — The library staff utilization: recruitment, selection, professional integration: training —1999 — Management of informational resources: training —1998 — The Formators Formation: training —1993 — Course of continuing education (Busteni, Romania) —1988 — Course of continuing education at the Moscow Institute of Culture —1973-1977 — State University of Moldova, Library Science Program

== Professional experience ==
•2001–2005 Coordinator of the Center for Continuing Education in Library and Information Science •From 2003–present Deputy Director of the National Library of the Republic of Moldova •From October 2000 till 2003 the Director of Department Research and Development in Librarianship

•From 1992 till October 2000 — Chief of Methodical Department; •1977–present — National Library of the Republic of Moldova

== Honors and awards ==
- "Librarian of the year" National Competition — 1981, 1982, 1986, 1996, 1998.
- Diploma of Ministry of Culture – 2001. 2004
- Order " Steaua Romaniei" – 2001.
- Medal "Meritul civic" 2002

== Social activity ==
- Member of the National LibraryBoard
- President of Library Association - branch of National Library of the Republic of Moldova 1992-2006
- Deputy director of the magazine "Magazine Bibliologic".
- Organizer of 5 projects supported by American Embassy in Republic of Moldova
- Vice president of Library Association of the Republic of Moldova
- Organizer of 11 editions of National Seminary
- Organizer of 20 editions of "Anul Bibliologic’’ Symposium
- Director of 4 projects supported by Fondation Soros-Moldova
- Member of the board of directors of Centre "Acces – Info"

Publications:

- "Are we also relatives of books?".: Magazin Bibliologic.-2008.-P.59-63
- Genuine memory: from the collection of the National Library of Norway: Magazin Bibliologic.-2007.-Nr.3-4.-P.82-85
- The National Library System of the Republic of Moldova: Magazin Bibliologic.-2007.-Nr.-2.-P.83-95
- Reflections at the jubilee: Magazin Bibliologic.-2007.-Nr.2.-P108-114
- A journey on biblical places: Gazeta Bibliotecarului.-2007.-Nr.7.-P.15-16
- CENL – The Conference of European National Libraries: Magazin Bibliologic.- 2006.-Nr.4.-P15-18.
- Digitization between politics and culture: Magazin Bibliologic.-2005.-Nr.1-2.-P.20—22.
- The library of the future: new outlines on the old basement: Magazin Bibliologic.-2005.-Nr.1-2.-P.72-80.
- The problems of promoting the national language and culture in virtual media: Magazin Bibliologic.-2006.-Nr.2-3.-P.65-69.

"Digital efforts of the Library of Congress": Magazin Bibliologic.-2004 Grant Harris, Vera Osoianu "Digital aspects in library activity": Library School of Moldova: Bulletin, 2004

"Library supporting lifelong learning (United States libraries experience): Library School of Moldova:Bulletin, 2004

"Library and Information Science Programs strategy:US experience": Library School of Moldova:Bulletin, 2004

"Global Reference Networks": Magazin Bibliologic.-2004

"The Public Information Library "G.Pompidou", a model for public libraries": Library School of Moldova:Bulletin, 2004

"The Library of Congress – a miracle in evolution": Magazin Bibliologic.-2003

"Some aspects of the continuing education in library and information science in Massachusetts (USA)" Scoala de biblioteconomie din Moldova:Bulletin trimestrial 2003, nr.1(4)

"America of our slogan or all for a patron, all for the blessing patron": Magazin bibliologic, 2003.-Nr.1

"Moldovan Collections at the Library of Congress": Gazeta bibliotecarului.-2003.-Nr.1-2

"Interlibrary Loan at the Librari of Congress": Gazeta bibliotecarului.-2003.-Nr.3

"FSA Contemporary Issues Fellowship (CI) Program": Gazeta bibliotecarului.-2003.-nr.1-2

"The book and the Internet": Gazeta bibliotecarului, 2003.-Nr.8-9

"Boston 2001 – the capital of the libraries world".: Magazin Bibliologic.-2001.-4.-P.13-16

"A decade on the sigh of reform" : Bibliological Magazine.-2001- Nr 4

"Cooperation and collaboration with projects – time imperative": Bibliological Magazine.-2000.-Nr2.-P.10-14.

"The library in the cipher's mirror": Bibliological Magazine.-2000.-Nr.1.-P.16-17.

" Prologue for the future of libraries" : Literature and Art. — 2000. — 16 Nov. — P. 6.

" The library, legislation and idea of democratization" : Romanian Language. —1999. — Nr. 3–5. — P. 212–214.

" S.O.S. Public Library" : The Voice of Nation. — 1998. — 30 Nov.; Library. — 1999. — Nr. 1. — P. 11–12.

" The book at the purlieus of civilization" : Dialogue. — 1997. — 12 Dec."

" A collaboration with the echo in the future" : Magazin Bibliologic. — 1996 — Nr. 4–6. — P. 107–108.

" Public library: the actual problems of organization and working" : Bibliological Magazine. — 1995. — Nr. 3–4. — P. 2–3.

" The evaluation criterions for professional library activity" : Bibliological Magazine. — 1994. — Nr. 2. — P. 11–12.

" The public libraries: to be or not to be": Magazin bibliologic. — 1993. — Nr. 5. — P. 27.

"The Column" or how is raising the National Library System ": Magazin Bibliologic. — 1992. — Nr. 8. — P. 11-12.

Corgenci Ludmila." Vera Osoianu and the moral size of the library".: Gazeta bibliotecarului.- 2003.-Nr.5 Corghenci Ludmila. Omul si Fapta ori Vera Osoianu – om al bibliologiei: Gazeta bibliotecarului.-2005.-Nr.10.-P.6. Kulikovski Lidia. A Good Friend of Libraries: BiblioPolis./2005./Nr.3./P47-48 Rau Alexe. Anii frumosi ai Verutei Osoianu: Osoianu Vera. Un deceniu sub semnul reformei/Biblioteca Nationala a Republicii Moldova.-Chisinau:BNRM.-182p.

Courses taught: Use of performance measurements in library assessment. At the Center for Continuing Education in Library and Information Science. Modern Library Services. At the Center for Continuing Education in Library and Information Science

- National trainer
