= Marjorie Cotton =

Australian librarian

Marjorie Cotton Isherwood
- Born: Marjorie Cotton; 1913; Australia
- Died: 2 February 2003; New South Wales, Australia
- Known for: Librarianship

Marjorie Cotton Isherwood, best known by the name Marjorie Cotton (1913–2003), was the first professionally qualified children's librarian in New South Wales, Australia. She initiated programs that are the basis of services to children in Australian public libraries today.

== Contributions to children's librarianship ==
Marjorie Cotton pioneered many of the services now associated with children's librarianship in Australia, including weekly story sessions, contact and collaboration with schools, providing material for children in languages other than English and appointing qualified children's librarians.

Her influence reached far beyond the Ku-ring-gai, Newcastle, Randwick and Woollahra libraries in which she worked. She was the first president of the Library Association of Australia Children's Libraries Section in 1953. Marjorie worked with Bess Thomas conducting the first Australian course in Children’s Librarianship at Mosman Municipal Library, which was attended by librarians from four states in 1954.

== Raising the standard of Australian children's literature ==
Marjorie acted as a judge on the Children’s Book Council of Australia Award panel several times. In this capacity she worked hard to raise the standard of Australian picture books. She contributed some additional chapters to Maurice Saxby's original survey of the history of Australian children's literature. Marjorie’s contribution to Australian children’s literature also includes persuading Desmond Digley to illustrate the well-loved Australian poem Waltzing Matilda by A.B. Paterson, which won the Australian Children's Book of the Year Award in 1971.

== Recognition ==
Marjorie Cotton's expertise was recognized by overseas organizations such as UNESCO, who sought her advice on children's library services in 1955 requesting that she prepare a paper for a seminar to be held in Delhi on the subject of “Stimulating Children’s Reading”. 800 delegates assembled at Parliament House where Prime Minister Nehru gave the opening address. Of the 46 presenters, only one was a woman.

=== The Marjorie Cotton Award ===
A biennial award was established in Marjorie’s memory by the Australian Library and Information Association. The Award strives to:

1. promote the role and image of librarians providing library services for young people
2. recognize individual achievement and co-operative networking in providing services for young people in public libraries and school libraries
3. encourage children's and youth services librarians and teacher librarians to actively support the profession and the Association

=== Past recipients of the Marjorie Cotton Award ===
- Melinda McNaughton (2008) Sutherland Shire Libraries
- Carolyn Bourke (2006), Fairfield City Library Service
- Joanne Oliver (2004), Camden Library Service
- Sarah Steed (2000), Parramatta Library
- Narelle Poulton (1998), Central Northern Libraries: Tamworth
- Heather Fisher (1996), Gosford City Library

== Images ==
A portrait of Marjorie Cotton, painted by Jean Isherwood, is held in Australia's National Portrait Gallery. A number of photographs of Marjorie Cotton are held in the Woollahra Library Local History Centre collection, highlighting the years Marjorie spent working there.

== Bibliography ==
Cotton, Marjorie (1989). A Good-kids-book-knower: autobiographical notes on the career of Marjorie Cotton in Children's Libraries of NSW. Printed for private circulation.

Cotton, Marjorie (February 1971). "Imaginative literature and the development of the individual". Children's Libraries Newsletter. 7 (1): 28.

Cotton, Marjorie (August 1988). "Margaret Cotton: the story of an Australian Children's Librarian". Orana: 129.

Saxby, H. M. (1971). A history of Australian Children's Literature 1941-1970. Sydney, New South Wales, Australia: Wentworth Books. ISBN 0-85587-020-6. With supplementary chapters by Marjorie Cotton.

"Carolyn Bourke: 2006 Winner of the Marjorie Cotton Award". Incite. 27 (9): 31. September 2006. Archived from the original on 4 September 2007.
