= Alexe Rău =

Moldovan scholar

Alexe Rău, also transliterated from Russian as Alexei Rau (Russian: Алексей Рэу) (23 December 1953 — 8 April 2015), was a Moldovan philologist, library scientist, librarian, educator, editor, poet, essayist, and philosopher (Ph.D.). During 1992-2015 he was director of the National Library of Moldova.

== Awards ==
Alexe Rău held several awards from the Union of Writers and Union of Artists, as well as other prizes awards and decorations:

- Премия «Золотое перо» бухарестского журнала «Библиотека» за книговедческие эссе (1993)
- Диплом ЮНЕСКО (2002)
- Медаль Европейского Союза (2002)
- Золотая медаль Фонда отличий в Женеве (2005)
- Meritul Civiс medal (1996)
- Mihai Eminescu medal (2002)
- Romanian Order For Merit, Commander's grade (2000)
- Орден Почета (2010)
- Премия Министерства культуры Республики Молдова (2011)
- Трофей ЮНЕСКО (2012)
- почетное звание «Заслуженный деятель культуры» (2012).
