= National Library of Moldova =

Coordinates: 47.0228°N 28.8299°E

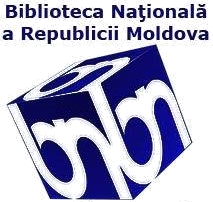

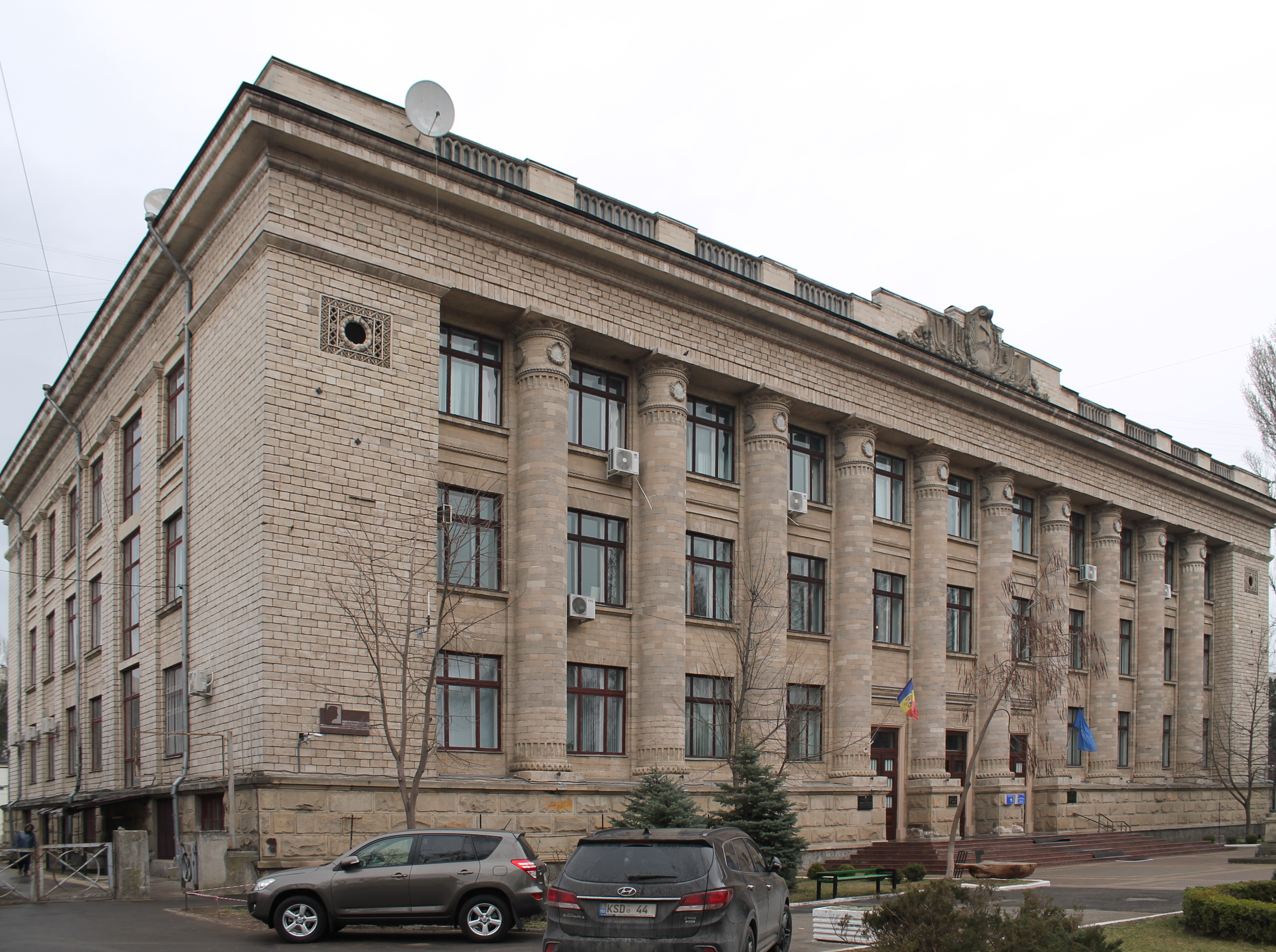
- The library in 2019
- Location: 78 31 August 1989 Street, Chișinău, Moldova
- Established: August 22, 1832 (194 years ago)

Other information
- Director: Elena Pintilei
- Website: Official site

The National Library of Moldova (Romanian: Biblioteca Naţională a Republicii Moldova, BNRM) located in Chișinău, Moldova is the main library of the state, which is responsible for conservation, valorization and protection of written cultural heritage. The National Library operates according to the guiding principles of UNESCO referring to this type of libraries, it is part of the European Digital Library. Founded in 1940, it traces its roots to the Gubernatorial Public Library of Bessarabia established in 1832. At present, the National Library is one of the objectives with great value of the national patrimony and presents the treasure written and printed cultural heritage of the country. Library ensures wide public access to its collections for research, study and / or information. The Director General is Elena Pintilei.

The library is accessible to all users who have reached the age of 17.

From 1992 until his death on April 8, 2015 the director of the National Library was Alexe Rău, Ph. D., a library scientist, philosopher, poet and essayist.

== Mission ==
The National Library is a state institution subordinated to the administrative Ministry of Culture of the Republic of Moldova. The Library operates under the principles of autonomy, freedom, political disengagement, cultural national identity and of legislation and its status. National Library of Moldova represents the treasure of cultural heritage written and printed, which is tasked with:

- filling, storing and offering for users collections of national editions, precious foreign publications, manuscripts, audiovisual and multimedia materials etc.;
- preservation of national memory comprised in printed heritage, providing them to its beneficiaries and transmitting to new generations;
- scientific development of patrimonial collections.

== History ==
The Gubernatorial Public Library of Bessarabia (later Public Library) was established in Chişinău by an order of the Ministry of Internal Affairs of the Russian Empire which remains the founder of the library until 1917. On August 22, 1832, took place the inauguration of the library, at that time the governor of the country was A. I. Sarokumski. The doctor of law, Peter Manega, came from Bucharest and he was preoccupied of finding, renting this building and also the purchase of books fund. The first librarian was Gabriel Bilevici, an intellectual with studies done in Chernivtsi, a professor at the Gymnasium nr. 1- a school for the boys from Chisinau, where there hosted for a while library. The books from the private library of the Colonel I.P. Liprandi, and from Kelhner and from professor Arhanghelski, also the publications donated by G. Polonski și Balen de Bal- laid the foundation for the library’s initial stock. The school director A. Grinevici from Bessarabia, adopted the rules of the public library from Odessa to that of Chisinau.

In 1831, the monger Bogaciov makes available for Public Library in Chisinau one of his houses in which it was inaugurated the library. In 1832, the monger I.Kriukov buys Bogaciov’s house and make a proposal to the library to extend the lease until 1853. After Peter Manega has obtained in 1832 the money needed for lease renewal to Kriukov's house, library remained there until 1834- in three small rooms. In 1835, Peter Manega rent for library a new building, built by the same monger Bogaciov, opposite the city boulevard, which does not have an entry from the street. The following librarians - Kozlov, Saburov, Tanki - tried, but failed an improvement of conditions of the institution.

Only after 1857, the new librarian Venedict Beler, professor of German Language and Mathematics at Gymnasium No. 1, manage to convince the governor Fonton Verraion that the library can no longer remain in a provisional state. In 1860, the library is transported into a beautiful space located in area of the current USM. V. Beller deals from switching inventory and making the public to know about a composition of the collection and providing access to it. The year 1860 was called in the press “Anul bibliotecii lui Beller”. Due to the lack of finance, at the request of gubernatorial administration, in 1869 library was transferred to the financing of the city. In 1877, according to the order of the Ministry of Interior, library with all its heritage is moved to the headquarters of the Duma.

== Directors ==
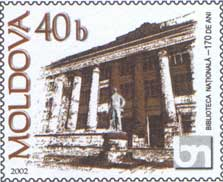
Moldovan stamp featuring National library

The following have been Directors:

- Gubernatorial Public Library of Bessarabia (1832-1875)
  - Gavriil Bilevici (1832–1835)
  - Nicolai Kozlov (1835–1846)
  - Mihail Saburov (1846–1847)
  - Ivan Tanskii (1848–1855)
  - Platon Globaciov (IX-XII, 1852)
  - Botean (1855–1856)
  - Petru Şuşchevici (1856–1857)
  - Venedict Beler (1857–1871)
- Public Library of Chişinău (1876-1939)
  - Kurkovskaia (1871–1877)
  - Daria Harjevskaia (1884–1924)
  - Maria Arionescu (1931–1934)
  - Elena Niţescu (1934-)
- State Republican Library of the Moldavian SSR (1940-1990)
  - Adeli Cernoviţkaia (1944–1946)
  - Iguatie Teleuţă (1946–1948)
  - Alexandr Suhomlinov (1948–1955)
  - Ion Borş (1956–1959)
  - Alexandru Chirtoaca (1959–1963)
  - Gheorghe Cincilei (1963–1964)
  - Petru Ganenco (1965–1983)
  - Grigore Sudacevschi (1984–1987)
  - Tatiana Levandovskaia (1987–1992)
- National Library of the Republic of Moldova (from 1991)
  - Alexei Rău (1992-2015)
  - Elena Pintilei (2015-)

== Collections ==
One of the major tasks of BNRM is the establishment, maintaining and providing access to a collection of national editions and foreign valuable publications. The collections are completed by legal deposit, purchase, donations, and interlibrary exchange. BNRM is keeper of a precious fund of documents, totalling 2.5 million in 30 languages. The thematic and linguistic horizon of the collections is universal. The BNRM Collections include traditional (monographs, serials) and nontraditional (disks, magnetic tapes, microfilm, maps, electronic documents, etc.) items.

=== The collection of old and rare books ===
The Collection contains over 21 thousand documents, including manuscripts, old Romanian books printed in the country and abroad, foreign books published before 1725, books with a polygraphic presentation and artistic significance, ex-libris books, typographical curiosities, personal collections, and old periodicals. The collection includes books that formed part of initial fund at 1832, when the library was inaugurated. Among them, an important role for books is held by General Liprandi, and two volumes of Aristotle commented by Donati Acciaioli and Simplicius. The Library holds the second edition of Cazaniei lui Varlaam (first book written and printed in Moldova, the Three Hierarchs in 1643), edited Râmnic (Muntenia) in 1792; Apostle, published in Bucharest in 1683, Moldova's description Cantemir, the German version (1771), Russian (1789), Romanian (1825); Trebnicul “Petru Movilă”, published in 1646 and illustrated by Elijah engraver.

=== Audiovideo Collection ===
The library possesses an audiovideo collection including sound recordings (26 000), printed music (66 000), and books and periodicals in the field of music. The collection includes all genres of classical and modern music.

=== The Collection of Art and Maps ===
The art and map collection has over 193 000 documents, including albums, art reproductions, posters, postcards, prints, and photographs. It has albums of "Classici dell'arte Rizzoli" and encyclopedias and dictionaries of art.

=== The Collection Moldavistica ===
Moldavistica collection consists of about 15 thousand documents and provides informational and documentary for users interested in the social-political, economic and cultural Moldova seen from the outside. The collection includes documents on Moldova, published in the republic and beyond its borders.

=== Referential Library ===
The referential library represents the most valuable collection of dictionaries, bibliographies, journals reports, catalogs, books of addresses, guidance, guidelines, laws, legal acts, official statements, statistical yearbooks in different languages of the world (about 60 thousand volumes).

=== Collection of world literature ===
World literature Collection contains approximately 60 thousand documents. Destination collection: providing information and documentary of researchers the field of literature. The collection includes books about literature in general, documents about the evolution of literatures and languages of the world countries.

=== Collection of Publications ===
It is one of the most voluminous library - 612 000 volumes - and includes magazines (5000 titles), newspapers (2500 titles), different reports and other works of scientific institutions etc.

=== The UN Library ===
In 2000, the National Library was awarded the status of library - the keeper of materials and publications of the United Nations in Moldova. Today the collection contains about 3000 the United Nations document, in English and French languages.

== Usage of library ==
BNRM users can become persons who have attained the age of 17. Entry permit is issued for a 5-year term and is subject to re-registration at the beginning of each year. The registration and user registration is based on the following documents: identity card, job identity card, student card, identification card pensioner. Collections availability is ensured through loan documents for users in the reading rooms, interlibrary loan and loan documents at home (for some categories of users). If users do not find the information needed in the village or in the country, they can turn to other libraries, including other states, through interlibrary loan.

== National Digital Library "Moldavica" ==
Being a part of the EDL in 2010, BNRM launched the National Digital Library Moldavica (BND). This performance is the result of actions and projects performed BNRM cooperation and integration on national and European level. Received as a full member of the Foundation Conference of European National Librarians (CENL), BNRM becomes soon the participant of the project of continental European Digital Library, whose mission is to digitize the written cultural heritage of European countries and organize electronic versions of property documents in a digital library accessible on the Internet. Nationally, BNRM initiated and developed in collaboration with 8 big libraries, 5 museums and the National Archives, the National Programme Memory of Moldova, restricted Programme UNESCO Memory of the World (Memory of the World), which is primarily aimed at safeguarding, conservation and communication of cultural heritage to future generations. The register of the program include old and rare editions, manuscripts, documents and archive documents, artifacts, museum objects which reflects the core of national written heritage. To integrate into the TEL (The European Library) and to compatibilize with it in all logistical and technical aspects, etc., BNRM participated in 2008-2009 at FUMAGABA project, initiated and funded by the European Commission (CENL).

One of the EU donors Swiss Agency for Development and Cooperation, has provided a grant account for BNRM of which was purchased a scanner (Atiz) and a large capacity server for archiving digital documents created. BND contains digital copies of documents from the 6 categories of publications of BNRM patrimonial funds: manuscripts, old national periodicals, maps, postcards, ex-librises. BND allows BNRM, on one hand, to extend the life of originals by limiting direct access to them, and on the other - to open a new stage in terms of people's access to cultural heritage written and printed, or, digital copies made accessible in Internet, in any place and in any home where there is a computer connected to the Internet. Being part of the European Library, BND can be accessed in any European country on site TEL.

== GALEX National Award ==
In 2011, in collaboration with the League of Librarians BNRM, they developed and began implementing a new system of thought and action in the field of librarianship, crowned by a system of assessment and national awards in the field - GALEX. Awards GALEX are granted in the following categories: Best librarian from national libraries, Best librarian in public libraries, Best politician supporter of libraries, Best founder of library, Best writer promoter of books and reading, best editor supporter of libraries, the best promoter and supporter of libraries, books and reading in the media, best project of librarianship, best work in library. The first national GALEX laureates were: Raisa Melnik (Head of Section, BNRM) and Maria Cudlenco (Director, Old Crihana Public Library); Iurie Leanca, Deputy Prime Minister, Minister of Foreign Affairs and European Integration; Gheorghe Duca, President of ASM; Boris Focsa, Minister of Culture; George Erizanu, writer; Anatol Vidraşcu, Publishing Director "Letter"; Dorin Chirtoaca, mayor of Chisinau; Vasile Petrea, businessman etc.

== Pro-European Centre for Services and Communication ==
Inaugurated on 10 May 2011, the Centre Pro-European Communication Services represents a subdivision of BNRM and aims to promote European values and support the process of European integration of Moldova. Whereas the Centre segment covers both the European Union and the Council of Europe, it promotes cooperation of those European organizations who share the same ideas, values and principles, helping to build a common democratic Europe. The Center of the Library was established under the Council of Europe the Office of Information in Moldova under the office of information of the European Council in Moldova. At the same time, it make available to beneficiaries documents and publications (European conventions, recommendations, best practices identified in the Member States). The center provides for users facilities in reading room, which can be found in over 10 thousand documents and publications of the European bodies and European databases accessed.

== Cultural events ==
The BNRM's mission is to contribute to the national cultural heritage. It organizes more than 50 programs and cultural events annually, including:

1. International Book Fair, founded in 1992, was included among the most important events of cultural and scientific life, with resonance in the country and abroad. The showroom includes exhibition-fair of publishing production of the last year, the transition reviewing and awarding achievements of the cultural, scientific popularization and value the culture written and printed.
2. Polyptych cultural-historical and scientific "Bessarabians in the world", founded in 1995, pursue an aim in Research and Valorify established personalities from Moldova and abroad. It consists of part-sessions including: conferences, communication sessions, exhibitions, meetings, film screenings, book launches etc.
3. Eminesciana is organized Eminescu's Remembrance Day. The program includes exhibitions from the collections of major libraries and collectors, symposia, literary conferences presentations of new books, premieres, movies etc.
4. The literary ensemble “Miorita”, founded in the 1960s by Academician Mihai Cimpoi popularizes values of national and universal literature.
5. Athenaeum "Moldova" include conferences of the most distinguished personalities in science, literature and art in Moldova on issues related to past, present and future.
6. Art Show popularizes all important genres of visual art through exhibitions and thematic personal exhibitions of artists from Moldova, presentation of albums and films about art, book launches, etc.
7. The show “Melomanilor” pursues cultivation of music lovers in Moldova. The sitting rooms are devoted to studying the history and theory of music, creative profiles of composers and performers etc.
8. Auditorium aims at familiarizing readers with the history of culture and civilization, life and work of the most important creators of science and art, organizing lectures and conferences, presentations, references to pupils and students.
9. Literary ensemble “Republic” include book launches, film screenings, discussions, meetings, lectures etc.
10. Exhibitions -Event is an act of artistic and scientific creation organized in collaboration with embassies in Chisinau and creative unions.

In 2011 has been the first Festival National Book and Reading sponsored by UNESCO through the national commission organized by the Ministry of Culture, BNRM in partnership with the Ministry of Education, Chisinau, Writers Union, Editors, Society of bibliophile divisions / sections culture of the territory. The purpose of the Festival: reviewing and stimulating activities to promote books, reading, library, bibliophiles held in libraries, schools, families, community; strengthening the role of books and reading in the development of culture and civilization in the community, national and local values; stimulating development and implementation of politics community in the field of books.

== Editorial activity ==
The annual portfolio of informational products of BNRM includes about 30 titles of publications, some of them becoming a visiting card of the library: National Bibliography of Moldova (Official publications, theses, Moldavistica), National Calendar, Librarianship of Moldova, Framework regulatory, the image of Moldova abroad, bulletin culture in Moldova, Chronicle life politico-administrative, socio-economic and cultural life of Moldova, the collection of materials and documents Basarabians in the world etc. In the editorial polygraph Project "Moldavica" which takes place over 15 years, develops and publishes BNRM publications following collections: our classics, “Plasticienii” of Moldova, Moldovan composers, Clio & Byblon, etc. Since 2005, editorial BNRM products can be found on the institution's website.

== Integrated Library of Moldova (SIBIMOL) ==
SIBIMOL is one of the most important strategic projects in Moldova librarianship and culture in general. The author and director of the project is Alexei Rau, CEO of BNRM. SIBIMOL's mission is to integrate the information libraries of Moldova into a national network via the Internet. The basic integration of the system will be collectively shared electronic catalog, which will reflect the collections and databases of all libraries in Moldova and will be accessible in every locality.

== National Library in the library network ==
BNRM performing multiple activities aimed at strengthening the National System of Libraries. In exercising the function of the national center for research and development in library and bibliology, BNRM do studies and researches related to the history of writing, books and printing in Moldova, the history of libraries, sociology of books and reading, analyzing the degree of satisfaction of information requirements and documentation of library users, carried out the most read books of the year, participating in Republican competitions. BNRM performed also scientific events: Annual Symposium "Year bibliologic" (an overview of the achievements of science and practice for the library last year, propelling ideas and points of guidance for next year) and the Symposium Values of bibliophile (includes scientific sessions, based on latest studies, research and investigations on values bibliophile, literary monuments, history books and literature, exhibitions, book launches), scientific conferences, round tables, etc.

The Chapter through development in library, BNRM focus on providing new tools of work for libraries in the territory, methodological assistance specialized of libraries, and documentary providing a consultative process to reorient the work of public libraries to implement specific services of the concept "Library" 2.0. In the field of promotion of advanced experience, special roles include professional communication through the Web page BNRM, launching blogs, organizing meetings at the Librarianship Club. BNRM produces a series of informative publications, helping the specialists in the field: Bibliological Store, Librarian Gazette, Bulletin and others, which are available in either traditionally or electronically. BNRM also ensures the functioning of the Centre for Information and Documentation in Bibliology that provides librarians, students etc. access publications in the field of Librarianship and Information Science.

== National cooperation ==
One of the major functions of BNRM is cooperation with public libraries at national level. For this purpose, in 2010 was established the Foundation Conference of Directors of Public libraries (district, municipal, city) – Moldova CoDiBiP. Key areas of activity include:

- The creation of the Integrated of Moldova's Libraries;
- The creation of General Catalogue "The Book of Moldova"
- The loan and exchange of publications;
- Elaboration of documents (programs, projects, rules, etc.);
- Organization of cultural and scientific activities;
- Organization in collaboration with the League of Librarians of national competitions;
- The creation of National Stock Publications;
- Receiving statistical situations from public libraries and from other libraries etc.

== International relationships ==
Integration of RM Information and International System is achieved through the collaboration with international bodies such as IFLA (International Federation of Library Associations), UNESCO (United Nations Educational, Scientific and Cultural Organization), CENL (Conference of European National Libraries). BNRM's external cooperation at bilateral level develops on the basis of special bilateral arrangements. The library has signed agreements (protocols) cooperation with:

- Cluj County Library;
- National Library in Warsaw;
- National Library of France;
- Russian State Library;
- National Library of Belarus;
- National Library;
- Library of Congress;
- National Library of Azerbaijan;
- Czech National Library;
- National Library of Kazakhstan, etc.

The collaboration with foreign libraries is based on:

- international exchange of publications;
- international loan of publications;
- organization of common manifestations;
- the exchange of editorial production of libraries;
- exchange of experience.

Since 2006, at the request of Moldovan diasporas abroad, BNRM participating in the creation of libraries in Italy (Reggio Emill), Greece, Russia, Ukraine, Portugal funds by filling them with books and periodicals in Moldova.

== National Library locations ==
The library is located in two headquarters:

- The central headquarters “Vasile Alecsandri”

(In 1997, in front of the building was uncovered a monument in the name of classic poet of Romanian literature Vasile Alecsandri, sculptor Ion Zderciuc).

- Headquarters nr.2 “Alexei Mateevici”

This building, in the past, hosted the first religious middle school from Bessarabia, founded at the initiative of Metropolitan Gavril Bănulescu-Bodoni, in which studied the priest-poet Alexei Mateevici. In the interwar period, here was the Faculty of Theology of the University of Iaşi. The building was restored at the beginning of the 20th century. In addition, this building represents an architectural monument protected by the state.

== See also ==
- Rodica Avasiloaie
- National library
