= Rodica Avasiloaie =

Moldavan writer

- Education: St. Petersburg State University of Culture and Arts
- Occupation: Librarian
- Awards: Order of the Star of Romania

Rodica Avasiloaie is a librarian from Moldova. She is the deputy director of the National Library of Moldova.

== Awards ==
- Order of the Star of Romania for outstanding achievements in spreading the Romanian culture, 2000
- Special prize for bibliographic work

== See also ==
- National Library of Moldova
