= Thea Schmitz =

German-Australian librarian (1927–1990)

Portrait of Thea Schmitz, date unknown

Thea Schmitz, born Maria Theresa Schmitz, (28 June 1927 – 22 September 1990) was a librarian who was the first librarian at Library & Archives NT in Darwin and opened the State Reference Library after building the collection. She was a strong advocate for professional library services.

== Early life ==
Schmitz was born in Cologne, Germany, and was the younger of two children to Franz Joseph Karl and Paula Louisa Schmitz. Schmitz's father, a lawyer, died while she was still attending school.

Schmitz's teenage years coincided with World War II and she remained with her family and completed her schooling and went on to attend the University of Cologne where, in 1953, she received her Doctorate of Philosophy.

In 1956 Schmitz immigrated to Australia where she first worked as a cook in 'Outback' Queensland and, soon after, she began studying for the Library Association of Australia's registration examination, to become a librarian. This study was via correspondence.

After completing this she held a number of roles including establishing and running the Administrative College Library in Papua New Guinea (1961-1966), being the chief librarian at the South Pacific Commission in Nouméa (1966-1970) before returning to Australia to be the foundation librarian at the Riverina College of Advanced Education in Wagga Wagga (1970-1971).

== Life in the Northern Territory ==
In 1971 Schmitz accepted the position as the chief librarian at the Northern Territory Library, now Library & Archives NT where she immediately began advocating for increased funding and now professional positions. She also became actively involved in advocating and planning for new libraries in other parts of the Northern Territory including Nhulunbuy Public Library (1974), Alice Springs Public Library (1980) and Casuarina Public Library (1980).

After Cyclone Tracy Schmitz was transferred to Canberra, to work from the National Library of Australia, and continue running the library service from there. This move was due to a government policy which meant that only essential personnel would remain in Darwin. While still in Canberra she undertook an ambitious acquisition project and purchased not only for the public libraries that she was responsible for but also creating the 'State Reference Library' collection. This collection was designed so that Northern Territory based clients would be able to access high quality reference services and not need to rely on assistance from other states.

Schmitz had returned to Darwin by January 1977 and, in November 1980, the State Reference Library opened on Cavenagh Street and contained 15,000 volumes. The 1980s saw a rapid period of grown for the library under the direction of Schmitz.

Schmitz was known for being an austere and forbidding figures to strangers, however, she was loyal and supportive to her friends. She had a reputation within the public service for straight talking and honest and was respected for her professional knowledge.

Schmitz retired in 1987 after having a stroke and died on 22 September 1990 in Darwin.

== Legacy ==
A rare book collection, the "Thea Schmitz Collection" at Library & Archives NT is named for Schmitz.
