= Eugene Owen Smith =

American biographer

Eugene Owen Smith (May 9, 1929 in Manhattan – July 25, 2012) was an American biographer.

Smith was a son of Julius and Sara Smith. He graduated from the University of Wisconsin with a degree in history. Due to his father's wishes he attended law school but dropped out from it six months later. In 1950s he joined the Army and was sent to Germany. He came back to New York City and started working as a clerk at Newsweek and by 1956 got a job with The Newark Star-Ledger.

From 1956 to 1960 he worked at The New York Post but quit it due to persuasion to write a book about a Wall Street millionaire and his murder in 1955, called The Life and Death of Serge Rubinstein which came out two years later. In 1964 he published a book about Woodrow Wilson called When the Cheering Stopped: The Last Years of Woodrow Wilson. Six years later he published a Herbert Hoover biography, The Shattered Dream: Herbert Hoover and the Great Depression. Seven years later he wrote a book about Andrew Johnson called High Crimes and Misdemeanors: The Impeachment and Trial of Andrew Johnson which was followed by Lee and Grant: A Dual Biography in 1984 and the 1998 biography of John J. Pershing called Until the Last Trumpet Sounds: The Life of General of the Armies John J. Pershing. In 2009 he published his last book called Mounted Warriors: From Alexander the Great and Cromwell to Stuart, Sheridan and Custer. Smith died of bone cancer at the age of 83.
