= Judith Nadler =

American librarian

Judith Nadler is an American librarian and former director of the University of Chicago Library.

== Early life and education ==
Nadler was born in Romania. She studied at the University of Cluj and finished her undergraduate studies at Hebrew University. She was awarded a Master of Library and Information Science from Israel Graduate School.

== Career ==
In 1966, Nadler's first job at the University Library was cataloging foreign-language materials. She was successively promoted to Head of the Social Sciences Section, Head of the Cataloging Department, assistant director for Technical Services and then associate director of the Library.

In October 2004, she was named to replace Martin Runkle as head of the library. While serving as head, she oversaw the planning and construction of the Joe and Rika Mansueto Library. Nadler retired on June 30, 2014.

Nadler raised much of the funding to build the Library's Judaica Collection.

She was a member of the Library of Congress' Working Group on the Future of Bibliographic Control
