= Louise Noëlle Malclès =

French librarian, bibliographer and teacher

- Born: 20 September 1899; Istanbul, Ottoman Empire (now Turkey)
- Died: 29 March 1977 (aged 87); Avignon, France
- Education: Blaise Pascal University
- Occupations: librarian, bibliographer, teacher, author

Louise Noëlle Malclès (20 September 1899 – 29 March 1977) was a French librarian, bibliographer and teacher who was a key figure in French librarianship and the author of one of the most important bibliographical works of the mid-20th century. She was one of the first notable French female library professionals, in a field which had been traditionally dominated by men. She was awarded the Legion of Honour for her immense contributions to the field of library science.

== Academic work ==
Louise Noëlle Malclès’ association with the Bibliothèque de la Sorbonne lasted from 1928 until 1962, where she worked as a teacher and practitioner in the field of bibliography. She also worked with UNESCO to develop the International Advisory Committee of Bibliography. Among her hundreds of works about bibliography are textbooks, style guides, manuals and scholarly articles.

=== Salle de Bibliographie ===
In 1932, Malclès established a bibliography room at the Sorbonne intended for students, faculty and scholars. Separate from the main reading room, it contained carefully curated bibliographic tools. This included bibliographies, library catalogs, literature guides and periodical indexes. The room, which only accommodated twenty students, focused primarily on bibliographic and documentation needs, rather than general research.

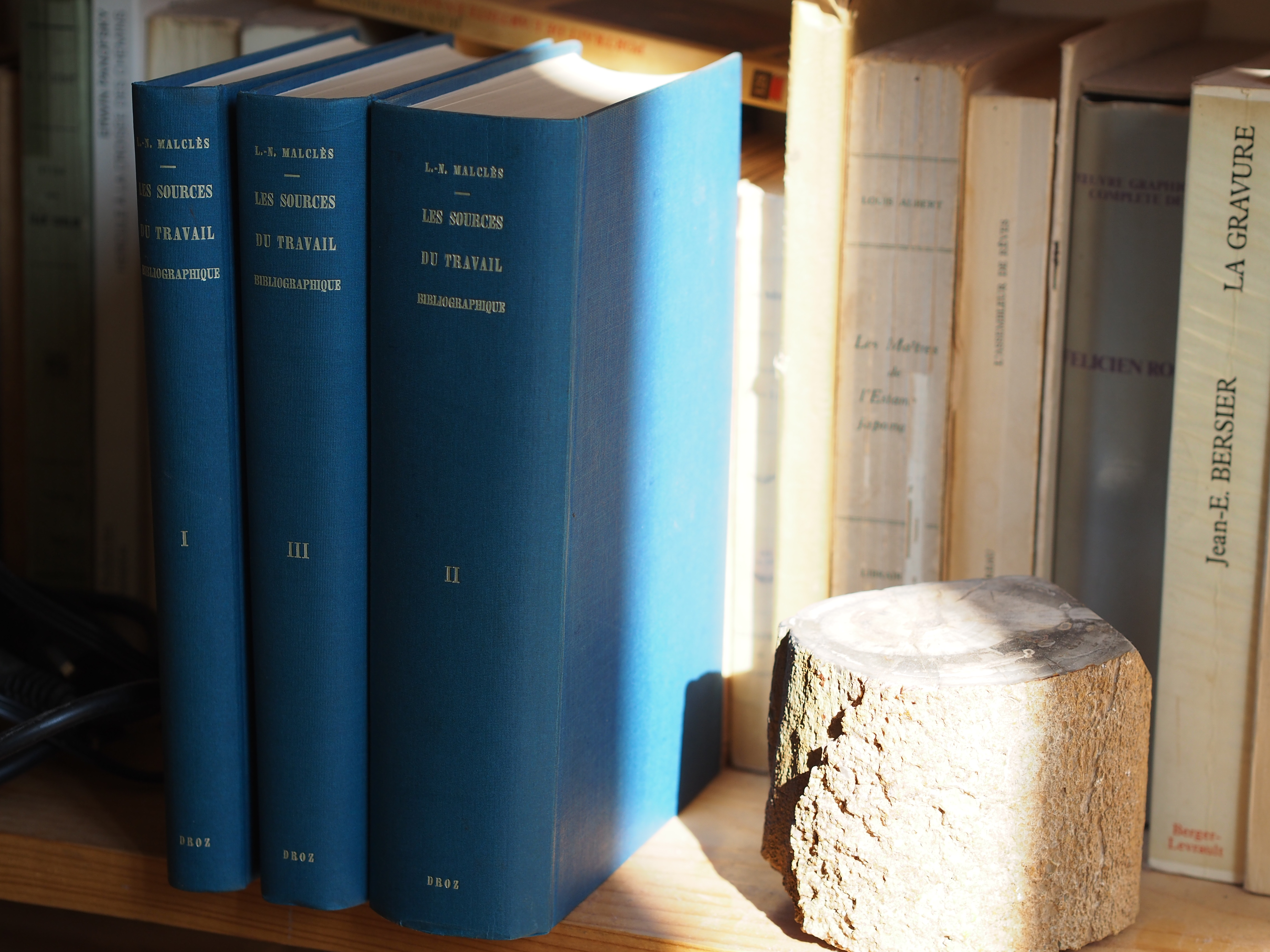
Les Sources du travail bibliographique by Louise-Noëlle Malclès

=== Les Sources du Travail Bibliographique ===
Les Sources du travail bibliographique (Sources for Bibliographic Work) is considered one of the most important bibliographic texts from the twentieth century. Originally published in 1950, it was not a guide to reference materials but for sources used for bibliographic purposes. The focus was on bibliographies, catalogs, indexes and abstracts, historical data, library resources and reviews of primary texts. It consisted of four volumes which were divided into two sections; general bibliography and specialized bibliography. The latter was subdivided into either pure sciences, medicine and pharmacy or the humanities. Especially notable is that Malclès conceived of and wrote almost the entirety of the text herself, which increased her reputation as expert in bibliographies. Despite this, there were no supplements nor later editions issued.

== Selected publications ==
- 1950: Les Sources du travail bibliographique
- 1954: Cours de Bibliographie: text for students studying archives and library science.
- 1956: La Bibliographie: history of bibliography, issued in three editions and translated into several languages.
- 1963: Manuel de bibliographie
