= Olinta Ariosa Morales =

Cuban librarian

- Born: 1921; Remedios, Cuba
- Died: 1999 (aged 77–78)
- Education: University of Havana
- Occupations: Librarian, activist, professor

Olinta Ariosa Morales (1921 – 1999) was a librarian from Cuba. She played an important role in the development of the public library and school library systems in her country after the Cuban revolution, in which she was jailed for her participation. Throughout her career she was an activist and advocate for multiple causes. She played a key role in the formation of the Cuban Association of Librarians.

== Early life ==
Olinta Ariosa Morales was born in 1921 in Zulueta, Remedios (now Villa Clara Province), Cuba to a family of sugar-workers. Her father was an administrator at the old San Agustín sugar mill. Olinta attended grammar school in her home town but finished her grammar education in Remedios.

In the 1940s, Olinta decided to study language and literary studies at the University of Havana School of Philosophy and Letters. Olinta went on to study Librarianship in Havana and graduated in 1953.

== Career beginnings ==
Olinta completed her degree but was not able to find paid work as a librarian so she decided to volunteer under the tutelage of renowned Argentinian librarian Carlos Victor Penna who was living in Havana at this time.

Penna was a specialist librarian at the UNESCO Regional Office for the Western Hemisphere. With the help of her colleagues Olinta established one of Cuba's first libraries that provided services to school children at Elementary School #2 in the Marianao district.

Olinta participated in revolutionary activities against the regime of then dictator Fulgencio Batista. Her participation in the revolution lead to her arrest and imprisonment in 1955.

== Librarianship in revolutionary Cuba ==
In 1959, Ariosa Morales began working to develop the Marianao Municipal Library. By 1962 she had been appointed to the directorship of the Department of School Libraries at the Ministry of Education which allowed her to expand many services to the newly developed school library in Cuba.

She created new administrative, scientific, and technological policies that had a lasting impact on students in the professional field of Library Science. Olinta went on to teach classes in librarianship at her alma mater, the University of Havana, until 1965.

In 1972, Olinta was selected to the executive board of the Institute for the Documentation of Scientific and Technical Information at the Cuban Academy of Sciences. While there her work helped to establish modern information services in Cuba with the introduction of techniques like data processing, programming languages, text publication, and international exchange between libraries.

In 1976, Olinta became the head of the Librarian Division of the Ministry of Culture, she decided to implement a system-wide approach to help improve Cuba's libraries through scientific methodology, reforming administrative structures, processing efforts, and library services. The emphasis on the use of "mini-libraries" helped to create greater access for the people.

She encouraged professional participation through sponsorship of meetings, conferences, and workshops. She also introduced and initiated a braille literacy campaign through the development of specialized services and facilities for the blind and visually impaired in public libraries throughout the country.

Her concept of ten cultural institutions in every municipality helped to place libraries as the most important and basic core of these institutions. She also served as the director of the José Martí National Library from 1976 to 1977. During this time she established a strong international professional network to exchange ideas and personnel with other libraries.

== Later life ==
In the 1980s Olinta devoted herself to establishing and promoting the Cuban Association of Librarians to which she became the first president. She organized and oversaw the first delegation of Cuban librarians to an IFLA conference in 1980, hosted by the Philippines in Manila. She died in 1999.

== Awards ==
In her life she was awarded the Bachiller & Morales Medal by the Cuban Association of Librarians, the Cuban Culture Award by the Ministry of Culture, and the Order of Alejo Carpentier in 1983.

Since 2005, the Cuban Association of Librarians has given a national award named in her honor recognizing librarians with an outstanding contribution to school libraries.
