= Ana Rosa Núñez =

Cuban-American poet and librarian (1926–1999)

- Born: July 11, 1926; Havana, Cuba
- Died: August 2, 1999 (aged 73); Miami, Florida
- Education: Universidad de La Habana
- Occupation: Librarian
- Writing career
- Genre: poetry
- Notable work: Escamas del caribe (Haikus de Cuba) OCLC 001011173

Ana Rosa Núñez (July 11, 1926 – August 2, 1999) was a Cuban-American poet and librarian. She authored over two dozen books of poetry, prose, and translations.

== Biography ==
Núñez was born in Havana, Cuba, to Dr. Jorge Manuel Núñez y Bengochea, a professor and architect, and Carmen Gónzalez y Gónzalez de Burgos. In 1949, she earned a scholarship from the Institute of International Education to attend the College of Wooster in the United States. In 1955, she graduated from the University of Havana with a library degree. In Cuba, she was head librarian of the National Audit Office (Tribunal de Cuentas de la Republica de Cuba, 1950–1961) and a founding member and vice president (1957–1959) of the Colegio Nacional de Bibliotecarios Universitarios.

Núñez came to the United States on September 10, 1965. She and another Cuban exile librarian, Rosa M. Abella, were hired by the University of Miami's Otto G. Richter Library. There, she and other librarians helped build a significant collection of material involving Cuba and the Cuban exile community. In addition to traditional scholarly works, this included other publications and ephemera and significant donations such as notebooks, photographs, and the papers of the Cuban anthropologist Lydia Cabrera.

Núñez published numerous books of poetry, literary criticism, and anthologies. She has been called one of the most outstanding of the group of Cuban poets born around 1930. She developed a particular interest in the Japanese haiku. She wrote a book of haiku in Spanish, Escamas del Caribe: Haikus de Cuba (1971), translated the work of American haiku authority Harold G. Henderson, and sent her haiku to the Emperor Hirohito on his birthday.

She died in Mercy Hospital in Miami of a brain hemorrhage at the age of 73.

== Bibliography ==
- Antología de la poesía religiosa de La Avellaneda. OCLC 001959253
- Antología de poesía infantil. OCLC 013567913
- Cartas al tiempo. OCLC 031686251
- Cinco poetisas cubanas, 1935-1969 : Mercedes Garcia Tuduri, Pura del Prado, Teresa Maria Rojas, Rita Geada, Ana Rosa Nuñez. OCLC 015379849
- Crisantemos = Chrysanthemums : (edición bilingüe, español/inglés). OCLC 026672247
- Ensayo de diccionario del pensamiento vivo de la Avellaneda. OCLC 001530388
- Escamas del caribe (Haikus de Cuba). OCLC 001011173
- Gabriela Mistral, amor que hirió. [Poesía]. OCLC 003185069
- Homenaje a Dulce María Loynaz : obra literaria, poesía y prosa, estudios y comentarios. OCLC 029359618
- Homenaje a Eugenio Florit : de lo eterno, lo mejor. OCLC 045649053, ISBN 0897298268
- Hora doce. OCLC 019804003
- La Florida en Juan Ramón Jiménez. OCLC 042863202
- Loores a la palma real. OCLC 003825327
- Los oficia-leros. OCLC 001320304
- Poesía en éxodo : el exilio cubano en su poesía, 1959-1969. OCLC 001400705
- Sol de un solo día. OCLC 027954100
- Un día en el verso 59. OCLC 003714641
- Uno y veinte golpes por America. OCLC 025387716
- Viaje al Cazabe. OCLC 001394221
