= Aurora Díaz-Plaja i Contestí =

Catalan writer and librarian (1913–2003)

Aurora Díaz-Plaja i Contestí (7 August 1913 – 8 December 2003) was a Catalan writer and librarian. Born in Barcelona, Díaz-Plaja also worked as a critic, journalist, lecturer, and translator during her career. She was the sister of the writers Ferran Díaz-Plaja i Contestí and Guillem Díaz-Plaja i Contestí. Her published work included topics such as library management, as well as stories for small children, in both Catalan and Spanish.

== Biography ==
In 1933, Díaz-Plaja received a library degree, working initially in Palma de Mallorca. During the Spanish Civil War, she was in charge of outreach services to hospitals and sending books to the war front. After the war, she worked as a librarian and archivist, responsible for the Libraries of Catalonia, including the Ciutadella Park Children's Library in Barcelona, which she directed from 1963 to 1973.

Díaz-Plaja was also a writer on topics such as library management, education and history of literature. Her work appeared in the newspapers El Ciervo, Avui, Serra d'Or and El Món. In 1955, she won the National Award for the Best Children's Book. In 1982, she organized the first Catalan language exhibition of children's books at the International Youth Library in Munich. In 1998, she received the Creu de Sant Jordi award. In the same year, she gave her collection of children's literature, more than 1,500 works, to the Universitat Catalana d'Estiu. She was an honorary member of the Associació d'Escriptors en Llengua Catalana, which, from 2000, has awarded a literary prize that bears her name. She died in Barcelona in 2003.

== Selected works ==
- El rey negro (1953)
- Tres rondalles de Nadal (1954)
- La niña de los sueños de colores (1959)
- La isla llena (1961)
- La ruta del sol (1965)
- Entre juego y juego... ¡un libro! (1961)
- La rana que salta (1968)
- El foc de Sant Joan (1969)
- Ahïmsa, la no-violència de Gandhi (1987)
- Les entremaliadures de Till Olibaspill (1979)
- Vides paral·leles o contes de debò (1980)
- Com es forma i com funciona una biblioteca (1960;)
- La biblioteca a l'escola (1970)
