= Environmental Toxicology and Chemistry =

- Discipline: Environmental chemistry Environmental toxicology
- Language: English
- Edited by: G.A. Burton, Jr.

Publication details
- History: 1982–present
- Publisher: Wiley-Blackwell
- Frequency: Monthly
- Impact factor: 3.742 (2020)

Standard abbreviations
- ISO 4: Environ. Toxicol. Chem.

Indexing
- CODEN: ETOCDK
- ISSN: 0730-7268 (print); 1552-8618 (web)
- LCCN: 2004213297
- OCLC no.: 609941643

Links
- Journal homepage; Online access; Online archive

Environmental Toxicology and Chemistry is a monthly peer-reviewed scientific journal covering environmental toxicology and environmental chemistry. It was established in 1982 and is published by Wiley-Blackwell in conjunction with the Society of Environmental Toxicology and Chemistry. The founding editor-in-chief was C.H. Ward (Rice University), and the current one is G.A. Burton, Jr. (University of Michigan). According to the Journal Citation Reports, the journal has a 2021 impact factor of 4.218, ranking it 117th out of 279 journals in the category Environmental sciences and 29th out of 94 in the category Toxicology. As of January 2025, the journal is no longer published by Wiley. [5]
