= Annie Maude Blackett =

New Zealand librarian

Annie Maude Blackett (30 July 1889 – 12 June 1956) was a New Zealand librarian. She was born in Newcastle upon Tyne, Northumberland, England, on 30 July 1889 to Annie Pile and Thomas Robert Blackett. She was one of the first Chief Librarians to be trained in New Zealand.

== Biography ==
=== Early life ===
Blackett attended several schools in her hometown of Newcastle, including attending a boarding school for three years, when the family moved to South Africa she did not attend school due to remoteness. She claimed that this 'unorthodox schooling' was not typical of someone looking for library work which she found when applying for her first role at Christchurch Public Library. Blackett arrived in New Zealand around 1907 with her sister, Ellen, and became a junior library assistant at Christchurch Public Library in 1913, after her sister advised her of the job advertisement in a newspaper.

=== Career ===
During her time at Canterbury Public Library Blackett worked with Howard Strong, and Ernest J. Bell. The chief Librarian at the time Blackett started was Howard Strong, who increased her salary when he heard it was difficult for her to live on her weekly salary. When Strong was succeeded by Ernest J. Bell in mid-1913, Blackett was promoted to second assistant. Bell was a prominent English Librarian and implemented the Dewey Decimal Classification System whilst at Canterbury Public Library, Blackett felt she owed a lot to Bell for her training during this time.

She was appointed chief librarian at Whanganui Public Library in 1918. She received significant support from the library committee and the town clerk as well as being given an assistant to help with several innovations she made whilst in the role. The most significant innovation Blackett made was the introduction of a juvenile department at Whanganui Public Library, this continued throughout her career with children's reading needs at the forefront of her work for many years. She persuaded members of the Whanganui City Council to invite J.C. Andersen, the librarian at Alexander Turnbull Library to speak to children. Blackett also encouraged children to read and take care of books by placing advertisements in local newspapers offering children the opportunity to exchange Three Castles cigarette cards for copies of the 'Three Castles' book of New Zealand birds. She would encourage children to take care of 'this book [like] a bee [takes care of] a flower'.

In 1922, Blackett earned the Library Association of the United Kingdom's certificate for practical library administration.

After completing the certificate, Blackett remained at Whanganui Public Library, the city and number of subscribers was growing and the need for a new building was clear. Funds were provided to build the Alexander Library in Queen's Park, Whanganui, which opened in June 1933. Whanganui city council allowed for Blackett to participate in the planning of this new library which led to compliments from travelling librarians such as Ralph Munn, the then director of Carnegie Library in Pittsburgh, who described it as a model of careful planning. Munn was travelling to survey New Zealand libraries for a report written with John Barr. The report, titled New Zealand Libraries: a survey of conditions and suggestions for their improvement is also known as the Munn Barr report published in 1934. The report's publication was sponsored by the Library Association of New Zealand, from whom most of the libraries featured had received support. The Munn Barr report would influence the development of libraries for the next 30 years.

Her other initiatives included sending withdrawn books to psychiatric facilities and military camps, on one occasion 1 1/2 tons of books were sent to Waiouru during the Second World War.

She died in Whanganui on 12 June 1956.
