= Rosa M. Abella =

Exiled Cuban librarian

- Born: Rosa Margarita Abella; 13 February 1920; Havana, Cuba
- Died: April 2, 2007 (aged 87); Miami, Florida
- Education: Universidad de La Habana
- Occupation: Librarian

Rosa Margarita Abella (13 February 1920 – 2 April 2007) was an exiled Cuban librarian who worked at the University of Miami's Otto G. Richter Library. She started the Cuban Heritage Collection in 1962.

== Biography ==
A native of Havana, Abella received her library technician degree in 1955, a professional publicist certificate in 1957, and a PhD in 1958. She served as the head of the circulation department for the National Library of Cuba from 1960 to 1961, at which point she left the island for Miami, Florida, as a political refugee. She worked as a librarian at Assumption Academy until she was hired as an acquisitions librarian for the Otto G. Richter Library in 1962, specializing in Spanish and Hispanic materials.

Abella started the Cuban collection with a few materials in 1962 . She worked with fellow librarians like the poet Ana Rosa Núñez to build the library's Cuban and Cuban exile collections, and she was instrumental in the founding of its Cuban Heritage Collection.

The library also has an eponymous collection, the "Rosa M. Abella Collection, 1996-1997," which contains archival material related to the 1996 shootdown of two Brothers to the Rescue planes by a Cuban Air Force MiG-29UB. Abella coauthored a bibliography, in Spanish, about the incident.

== Publications ==
- Febrero 24, 1996, derribo de dos avionetas : Armando Alejandre, hijo, Carlos Costa, Pablo Morales y Mario de la Peña: bibliografía. Miami: [publisher not identified], 1999. OCLC 046457260
- Publicaciones periódicas editadas en el exilio y en existencia en la Biblioteca de la Universidad de Miami. Washington, District of Columbia: Pan American Union, 1966. OCLC 182545526
