= Gene Smith =

Gene Smith may refer to:

- Gene Smith (American football executive) (born 1963), former general manager for the Jacksonville Jaguars
- Gene Smith (American football coach) (died 1987), former college football coach
- Gene Smith (American football guard) (1905–1979), American football guard
- Gene Smith (athletic director), athletic director at The Ohio State University
- Gene Smith (baseball) (1911–1995), Negro league baseball player
- Gene A. Smith (born 1963), American historian
- E. Gene Smith (1936–2010), scholar of Tibetology
- Ray Gene Smith (1928–2005), American football player

== See also ==
- Eugene Smith (disambiguation)
- Jean Smith (disambiguation)
