= Jean Chandler Smith =

- Born: 1918
- Died: 1999 (aged 80–81)
- Scientific career
- Fields: Bibliography

Jean Chandler Smith (1918–1999) was an American librarian and bibliographer.

== Biography ==
Smith was born in 1918. She attended Bryn Mawr College in Bryn Mawr, Pennsylvania, and received a Bachelor of Arts degree in 1939. She later attended Yale University and received a Master of Science degree in 1953. In 1973, she earned a MLS degree from the Catholic University of America in Washington, D.C.

Smith became a reference librarian for the District of Columbia Public Library in 1939, and remained in this position till 1943. She worked as a librarian in Hawaii and a translator in Panama during the last years of the second World War. She became a librarian and research associate for Yale University in 1944. She became the Acting Chief of Acquisitions at the National Institutes of Health Library in 1959. Four years later, in 1963, she transferred to the Department of the Interior. In 1965, Smith joined the Smithsonian Institution Libraries (SIL), where she worked as an Acting Director in 1972, and 1977 through 1979. She retired two years later, in 1981, but still participated as a research associate for SIL afterwards.

He best known book is an annotated bibliography of Georges Cuvier (1993), a French naturalist.

She died in 1999.

== Bibliography ==
- Smith, Jean Chandler. Georges Cuvier: An annotated bibliography of his published works. Smithsonian Institution Press (1993). ISBN 1560981997.
