= Academy School, Glastonbury =

Coordinates: 41.7072°N 72.6086°W

Information
- Closed: 2001

Academy School is a former school complex located in Glastonbury, Connecticut, United States. It was discontinued for school use in 2001 with the opening of the Smith Middle School and renovation of the Gideon Welles School. From 1974 to 2001, Academy School was the town's sixth-grade school, although it housed some fifth-grade students as well for many years. Among many other uses, academy also served as the Glastonbury High School from 1923 to 1953.

== Buildings ==
A wing, constructed in 1923 (and added onto in 1926), has been used as the Glastonbury Town Hall since 1983. This building served as the town's high school until the current high school was built in 1953. According to the plaque in the lobby, the building served as an elementary school from 1952 to 1962, a junior high school from 1962 to 1967, and an elementary school after 1967.

B wing, constructed in 1915, is also known as the Williams Memorial Building. For many years, it was used as a recreation center and as a gymnasium facility. More recently, the upper level housed the school library and the lower level served as the art room.

C wing, constructed in 1961, was built to house junior high students, and later used for sixth grade students. The cafeteria and gymnasium are part of this building. This wing connects to both B wing and D wing.

The former D wing, constructed in 1930, was built as an elementary school and has been used for many purposes, most recently for sixth grade students.

== Current use ==
The Glastonbury Town Hall has been housed in the A wing since 1983. Other parts of the building are used for the teen center, gymnastics program, community use, and storage. Recently, the town of Glastonbury's IT office and Facilities office, as well as the Parks and Recreation administration, moved into parts of C wing.

== Future plans ==
The town has been working to convert Academy into a municipal center. Remaining plans would move the council chambers into the vacant upper level of B wing.

== Controversy ==
Academy's D wing was recently demolished. Previously, the Historic District Commission of the town approved an application by the town to demolish D wing in order to build a new facility for the board of education on the site. However, plans for a new facility have been put on hold by the Town Council. A $9.5 million referendum to renovated and expand D wing to house the Board of Education offices was defeated on November 4, 2008, by a vote of 8,581-9,868.

== Glastonbury Free Academy ==
Prior to the construction of the A wing in 1923, the Glastonbury High School was housed in the former Glastonbury Free Academy building, which was constructed in 1870 and demolished in 1960, to make room for the new C wing. The Glastonbury Free Academy was the predecessor to Glastonbury High School.
