= Mary Myrtle Tye =

American medical librarian

Mary Myrtle Tye (1886–1933) was an American medical librarian from Atlanta, Georgia, who became the first librarian of the Abner Wellborn Calhoun Medical Library at Emory University, later renamed the Woodruff Health Sciences Center Library.

== Early life and education ==
M. Myrtle Tye was born March 26, 1886, the daughter of Atlanta lawyer John Lewis Tye, Sr. and Carolyn (Carrie) Wilson. She attended public schools in Atlanta before enrolling in the Academy of the Sacred Heart in Manhattanville, New York (now Manhattanville College), where she pursued post-graduate work after graduating in 1902. She later studied librarianship at the Pratt Institute and worked at the Library of Congress.

== Career ==
Tye was appointed the first librarian for the Abner Wellborn Calhoun Medical Library at Emory University, which opened on January 1, 1924. Tye helped build the new library’s collections and advocated for its growth and expansion, overseeing a move in 1931 to the West Wing of the Emory Hospital building. In 1930, she spearheaded an effort to purchase a 1543 edition of De Humani Corporis Fabrica Libri Septem by Andreas Vesalius, a landmark in the study of human anatomy.

== Service to the Library Community ==
Tye was an active member of the Medical Library Association, serving as a member of multiple committees and authoring several articles in the Association's Bulletin. As a member on the Committee on Compiling of Current Periodicals, Tye championed a union list of journals and library holdings to aid in leading and reference exchange between medical libraries.

As Chairman of the Executive Committee, Tye also worked closely with the Committee on the Cost of Current Medical Periodicals, led by Eileen R. Cunningham, to coordinate with the American Library Association and prominent journal publishers to address the high cost of German periodicals. Then considered the world scientific leaders, German medical journals and publications made up two-thirds of the library's collection budget.

Upon her death on August 6, 1933, Tye had held the position of Chairman of the Executive Committee of the Association for three years and had been reelected to a fourth term at the Association’s annual meeting in Chicago.

== Legacy ==
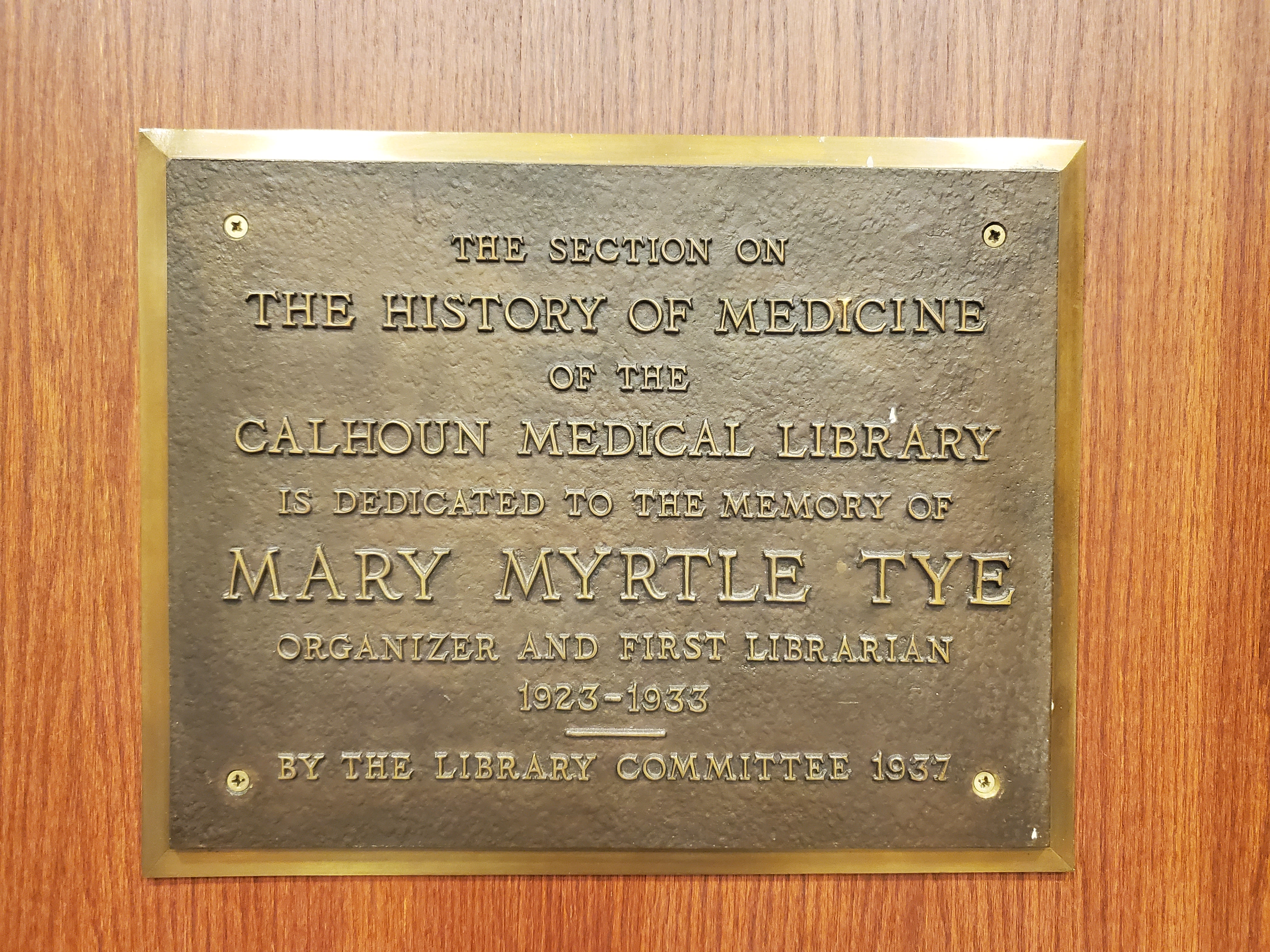

Following her death, Tye's father donated her final paycheck of $175 back to the A. W. Calhoun Library. These funds helped to establish the M. Myrtle Tye Special Collection for the History of Medicine, now housed at the Emory University Woodruff Health Sciences Center Library.
