= Michelle Zaffino =

American writer

- Education: University of Pittsburgh (B.A., MLIS)
- Writing career
- Genre: Young adult

Michelle Zaffino is an American author of young adult fiction and memoir, founder of the book discovery product MyLibrarian, an information architect, digital librarian, journalist and content consultant based in San Francisco.

== Early life and education ==
Zaffino grew up in Warren, Pennsylvania. She graduated from the University of Pittsburgh with a B.A. in English Writing (Magazine concentration), and Women's Studies. While at Pitt, Zaffino was a member of the Kappa Kappa Gamma women's fraternity. She continued her studies at the University of Pittsburgh and later completed the master's program in Library and Information Science with a concentration in Digital Libraries, Information Architecture, Management and Reference, in 2012.

== Career ==
Zaffino moved to New York City to pursue a career in magazine writing and editing. During her time there she worked as a writer, editor and researcher at Hearst Corporation for publications such as Marie Claire, Redbook, Elle, Sports Afield and Esquire. While managing the research department of Marie Claire, she wrote Does Your Guy Need A Makeover?, which inspired TV’s Queer Eye for the Straight Guy. Zaffino also worked in New York as the office assistant to literary photojournalist Jill Krementz. Her work has been published in Marie Claire, Redbook, Sports Afield, SEEN, Double Negative, IndiePlanet, Mr. Beller’s Neighborhood, The Bold Italic, and Takemywordforit.net.

She has written a teen novel, How Good it Can Be, and a sequel, The Love Quad, both Saffron Stories novels. Her historical young adult novel, Allegra, is based on the discovery of the satirical Pasquino statue in Rome, inspired by her paternal grandmother's name. Zaffino also wrote MyMultimedia Memoir, chronicling the journey of her first novel to publication. She received the Savvy Life Blogger Award in 2014. She published the serial interactive mystery Skylar Saffron, Librarian Detective online from 2016 to 2019, and is working on Librarian Detective, Book 2. Her novel, Be There, chronicling the journey of a surfing entrepreneur as she launches a company, was published in 2024.

Zaffino is the Founder, CEO and Chief Digital Librarian of In the Stacks.tv, a web portal that aggregates book content produced by librarians. The MyLibrarian app aims to provide users with a reference desk experience online. MyLibrarian/In the Stacks products provide book recommendations based on ranked librarian book reviews via a database, called the Librarian Brain. Founded in 2008, In the Stacks is the first online video book review program hosted by a librarian, and the associated eBook publishing company, In the Stacks Publishing, participates in Litquake Lit Crawl in San Francisco, where Librarian Authors In the Stacks read from their recent work. In the Stacks is startup-in-residence at the San Francisco Mechanics' Institute, and demonstrated the book discovery app there in March 2016, and later released as MyLibrarian. After incorporation and raising additional funding, MyLibrarian launched on TestFlight in 2025, with a full release in app stores in 2026.

Zaffino is an active participant in the freedom tech movement, concentrating on transforming journalism, where she's been a speaker at several notable conferences and often contributes as a podcast guest.

== Works ==
The Saffron Stories Novels:

- How Good It Can Be (2014)
- The Love Quad (2015)
- Skylar Saffron, Librarian Detective (2016–2019)
- Be There: A Novel (2024)
