= Matilda Cooke Maltby =

American librarian (1841–1912)

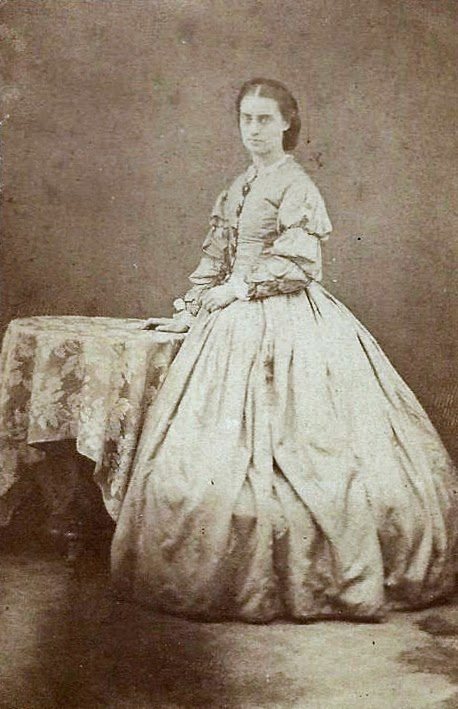
Matilda Cooke Maltby

Matilda Cooke Maltby (December 1, 1841 – March 25, 1912) was an American librarian.

== Biography ==
Matilda Mary Cooke was born on December 1, 1841, in Surrey, England. On January 7, 1863, she met John Rodgers Maltby, a merchant and lawyer, who was working on the trans-Atlantic Cable. After few months, she married John on September 7, 1863, at Clapham. Before her marriage, she converted to Catholicism.

After their marriage, they moved to Paris where John was engaged in a general merchandise business, which ended into debt. Subsequently, John went to the United States without Matilda due to lack of funds to take her along with him. In 1868, together, they moved to Sutton, Massachusetts, but left him. She later joined him during one of his business trips in Sutton and they remained together until 1877. They then shifted to Fairfield, Connecticut for John's business.

After her husband's death in 1895, she returned to Sutton where she became a librarian at the Sutton Library. Meanwhile, she also taught French and music in Sutton.

She died on March 25, 1912.
