= Bess Thomas =

Australian librarian

Bessie Thomas
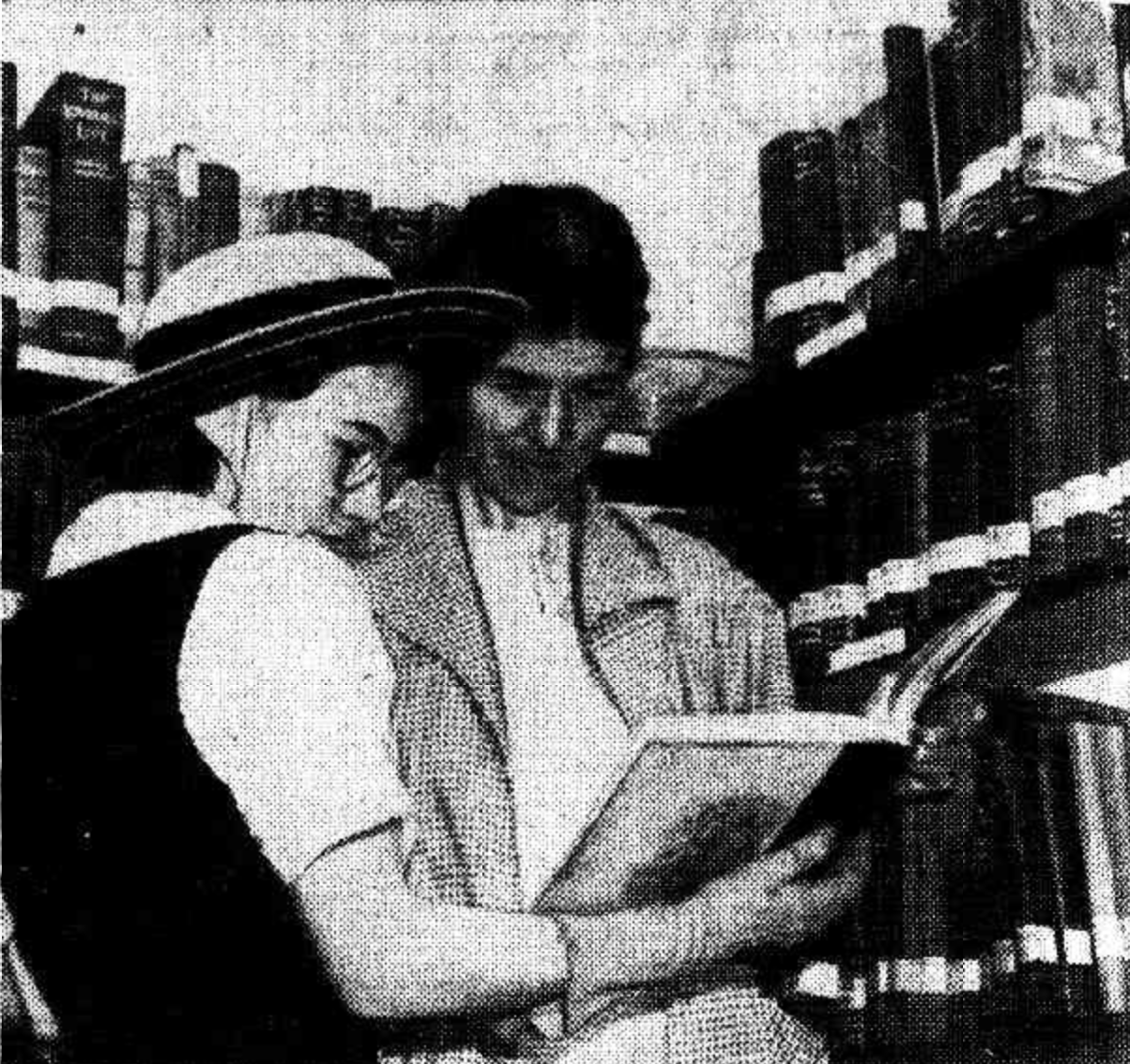
- Bessie Thomas and a young borrower at Mosman Children's Library, 1940
- Born: Bessie Margaret Thomas; 14 March 1892; Sydney, New South Wales
- Died: 7 March 1968 (aged 75); The Sacred Heart Hospice, Darlinghurst
- Occupation: Librarian
- Known for: First female chief librarian in New South Wales
- Parent(s): Henry Charles Thomas (father), Gertrude Augusta (mother)

Bessie Margaret Thomas (14 March 1892 – 7 March 1968) was an Australian librarian of English and Canadian heritage. In 1945, the Mosman Municipal Library was established and Thomas was given the position of chief librarian, the first female in New South Wales to have held such a position.

== Early life ==
Thomas was the third child of her father, Henry Charles Thomas. Shortly after her birth, the family moved from Australia to Canada, where Thomas received her education and trained as a librarian and secretary. After moving to Toronto, Ontario, Thomas was employed as an assistant librarian by her local university between 1927 and 1928 and later moved back to Sydney after being influenced to do so by her cousin, Allworth and an influential report highly critical of Australian libraries by Ernest Pitt.

== Contributions to librarianship ==
During a meeting chaired by Professor E.R. Holme in September 1934, the decision was made that Thomas and Edith Allworth, both of whom were honorary librarians, would establish a children's library in Mosman to develop children's interest in literature. Allworth and Thomas opened a small library using the garage at the Allworth home, with approximately 350 books at its first establishment. The library began to expand and moved locations to a building behind the Killarney School, only to move again in 1943 after a building was provided by the New South Wales Department of Education and Training.

After establishing the library, Thomas began extra activities for local children and communities such as story-hour's, book reviews and weekly chess groups. In 1945, the children's library she established was incorporated into a Municipal Library due to the 7,000 book stock belonging to the children's library and was given the title of the "Mosman Municipal Library" and Thomas was given the position of chief librarian, the first female in New South Wales to have held such a position. In 1952, the library moved locations for a third time and had 18,000+ volumes at this time.

On 5 March 1968, Thomas retired as chief librarian. After her death, Thomas was cremated with Anglican rites and the children's libraries section of the Library Association of Australia established the Bess Thomas Award to encourage effort and excellence in children's librarianship.
