= Margaret Mann (librarian) =

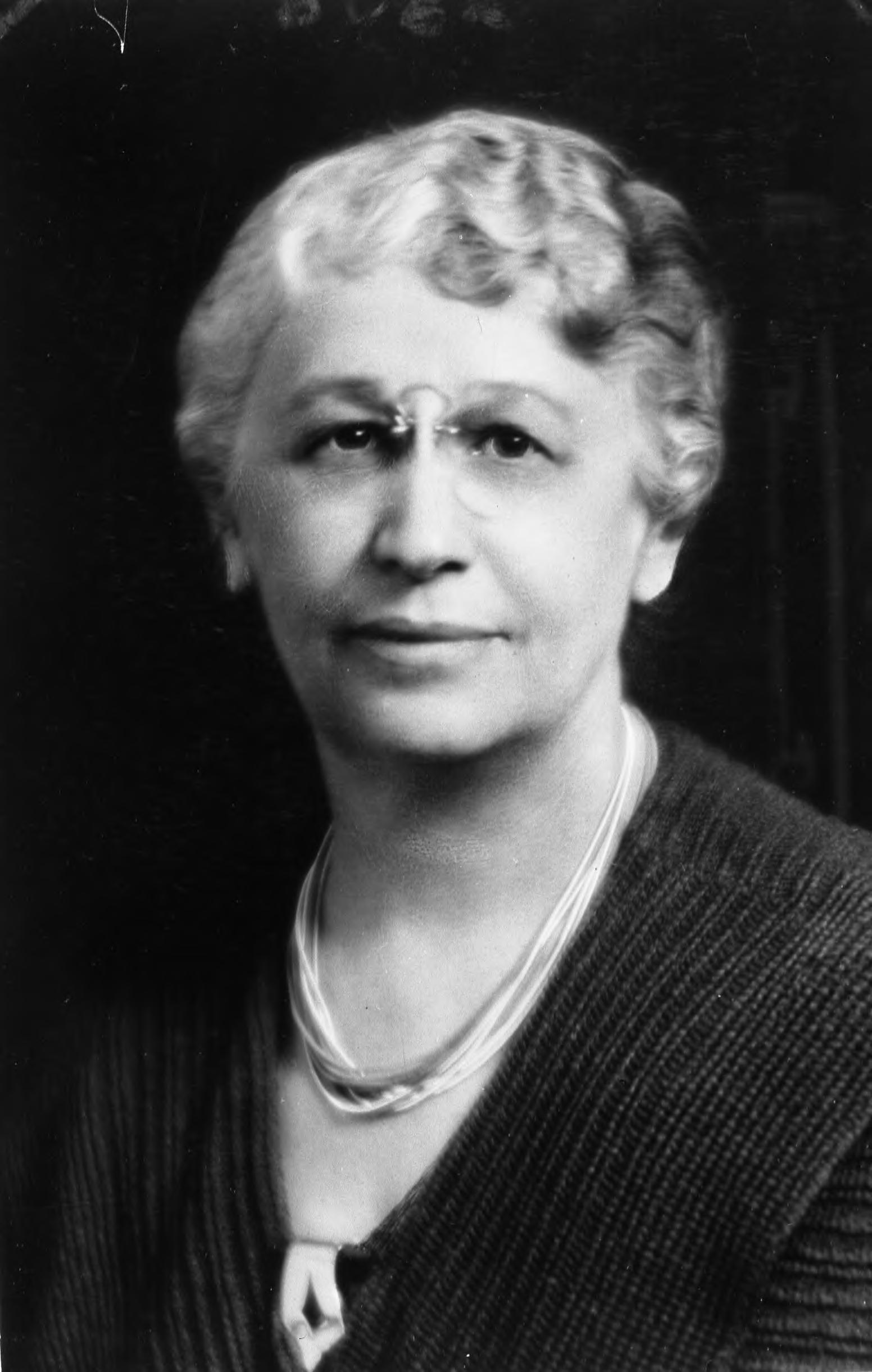
- Born: April 9, 1873; Cedar Rapids
- Died: August 22, 1960; California
- Education: Armour Institute
- Occupation: Librarian
- Known for: Contributions to the science of library cataloging
- Scientific career
- Fields: Library science
- Workplaces: University of Michigan; Carnegie Library of Pittsburgh; University Library

Margaret Mann (April 9, 1873 – August 22, 1960) was a noted librarian and teacher who influenced the field of cataloging for almost fifty years. The bulk of her career was spent as a professor at the University of Michigan. She was hired as one of the first three full-time faculty members in the department of library science at Michigan in 1926 and retired in 1938. In 1999, American Libraries named her one of the "100 Most Important Leaders We Had in the 20th Century".

== Biography ==
She was born on 1873 in Cedar Rapids, Iowa. While Mann was known throughout her career for her breadth of knowledge and contributions to academia, it is worthy to mention that she never formally achieved more than a high school diploma. Because her family was of modest means, Margaret or "Maggie" was strongly persuaded to attend the vocational school that had just opened near her home in Chicago. She completed a two-year study in the Department of Library Economy at the Armour Institute, where she quickly impressed the faculty; after only one year of schoolwork, she was awarded with a library position. In 1897, the Armour Institute was transferred to the University of Illinois at Urbana-Champaign where Mann continued to work for an additional six years. At this time, libraries were undergoing rapid change:

"Up to the time of the World's Fair at Chicago in 1893, attention had been-I think we may safely say-largely centered in the internal management…Of course I do not mean that other matters did not occupy thought and receive attention, but we may truly say the emphasis was on the internal side. In the next few years two other matters began to forge ahead-buildings and library extension. And then followed with almost alarming rapidity a sudden expansion of the activities of the library in every external relation. First the story hour and children's work was the great discovery, then traveling libraries and commission work, then branch libraries spring up".

At the library of the University of Illinois, Mann and her colleagues were integral to this transformation. When she first arrived at the library there had been no: "consistent policy of cataloging and classification…however, by the end of the first year and with the assistance only of students from the library school, all of the books had been accessioned, shelf-listed, and prepared for the shelves" This would not be the first time in her career that she undertook such a heavy ordered challenge with steadfast determination. Mann's interests started to expand beyond library science as she began to hone her teaching skills as a senior instructor at the University of Illinois. From there, she accepted a position as head of the Cataloging Department at the Carnegie Library in Pittsburgh. Her work there created quite a reputation for her career; her particular talent for both supervising and classifying in ostensibly "insurmountable difficulties was and remains, one of the finest of its kind". After many years at the Carnegie Library, she was offered a position at the Engineering Societies Library in New York City. This probably posed quite a challenge for her since she had previously never catered to that kind of library patron; however, she did not disappoint. In 1924, she went to the American Library Association School in Paris, France to teach cataloging and classification courses. She has been described as " the best teacher of these subjects found anywhere".

Her time in Paris proved that her talents extended beyond cataloging and librarianship, as she was even a highly effective and skilled educator. It is not surprising then that she was extended an invitation to join the faculty at the University of Michigan in 1926. Mann was one of three full-time professors hired at the department's inception. Her years there were described as "grand and good". During her time at the University of Michigan Mann wrote prolifically on a broad selection of topics ranging from: "the techniques and components of cataloging to such diverse topics as research and reference in the special library, the future of cataloging, the teaching of cataloging and classification, and personal interests in government publications, subject analysis, and children's literature". She authored several textbooks including Introduction to Cataloging and Classification of Books in 1930 and Subject Headings for Use in Dictionary Catalogs of Juvenile Books. The former was recognized as the primary teaching text almost "before it was published and remains, even today, a major guide to the principles of cataloging and classification.". Public service was at the heart of her philosophy of librarianship, "Here one turns his attention, not to gratifying his own hunger for literature, but to the far broader task of studying, recording, and interpreting books so that they may reach the thousands of readers who are in search of reading matter of various kinds and for various persons". Indeed, her entire career echoes her devotion to this goal.

Mann retired in 1938 at the age of 65; however, her extraordinary work did not go unrecognized. She was granted Emeritus from the University of Michigan as well as the ALA Joseph W. Lippincott Award. So high did she set the bar for librarians and catalogers that there is now an award named in honor of her. The Margaret Mann Citation is given every year to a distinguished librarian/cataloger. Mann died in 1960. She is buried beside her parents in Cedar Rapids, Iowa.
