= List of library science schools =

Information science (often termed as library and information science) is an interdisciplinary or multidisciplinary field that applies the practices, perspectives, and tools of management, information technology, education, and other areas to libraries; the collection, organization, preservation, and dissemination of information resources; and the political economy of information. Most professional library jobs require a professional post-baccalaureate degree in library science as a basic credential but this varies widely in different countries. There are also bachelor's, associate, and certificate programs in library science, which provide formal training of paraprofessional library workers, library technicians, and clerks—as well as preparation for graduate study in library science. A library school is an institution of higher learning specializing in the professional training of librarians. As of 14 February 2022 there are 64 American Library Association-accredited Library science programs in Canada and the United States and as of April 2026, 12 UK institutions offering CILIP-accredited programmes.

== Australia ==
- Charles Sturt University, multi-campus
- Curtin University, Perth, Western Australia
- Open Universities Australia, online
- RMIT University, Melbourne, Victoria
- University of South Australia, Adelaide, South Australia

== Bangladesh ==
- East West University
- National University, Bangladesh
- Noakhali Science and Technology University
- University of Rajshahi
- University of Dhaka

== Brazil ==
- Alagoas, Federal University of
- Amazonas, Federal University of
- Bahia, Federal University of
- Brasília, University of
- Ceará, Federal University of
- Espírito Santo, Federal University of
- Minas Gerais, Federal University of
- São Paulo, University of
- State of Rio de Janeiro, Federal University of
- Rio de Janeiro, Federal University of

== Canada ==
- Alberta, University of
- British Columbia, University of
- Dalhousie University
- McGill University
- Montreal, University of
- University of Ottawa
- Toronto, University of
- Western Ontario, University of

== France ==
- Ecole nationale supérieure des Sciences de l'Information et des Bibliothèques

== Germany ==
- Berlin School of Library and Information Science
- Cologne University of Applied Sciences
- Fachhochschule Potsdam
- Hanover University of Applied Sciences
- Hochschule der Medien
- Leipzig University of Applied Sciences (Hochschule für Technik, Wirtschaft und Kultur/HTWK)
- Technische Hochschule Köln
- University of Applied Sciences Hamburg

== Hungary ==
- Eötvös Loránd University

== India ==
- Aligarh Muslim University
- Andhra University
- Assam University
- Babasaheb Bhimrao Ambedkar University
- Banaras Hindu University
- Bangalore University
- Bundelkhand University
- Delhi University
- Dibrugarh University
- Gauhati University
- Goa University
- Guru Ghasidas Vishwavidyalaya
- Indian Statistical Institute (DRTC)
- Indira Gandhi National Open University
- Jadavpur University
- Jiwaji University
- Jodhpur National University
- Mangalore University
- Nirwan University Jaipur
- Mizoram University
- Netaji Subhas Open University
- North Bengal University
- North-Eastern Hill University
- Pondicherry University
- Rabindra Bharati University
- SNDT Women's University
- Tata Institute of Social Sciences
- University of Burdwan
- University of Calcutta
- University of Kalyani
- University of Madras
- University of Mysore
- Vidyasagar University
- Central University of Gujarat

== Indonesia ==
- University of Indonesia
- Indonesia Open University
- Airlangga University
- Brawijaya University
- University of Bengkulu
- Diponegoro University
- University of Malang
- Padjadjaran University

== Iran ==
- Al-Zahra University
- Allameh Tabataba'i University
- Ferdowsi University of Mashhad
- Kharazmi University
- Razi University
- Shahed University
- Shahid Beheshti University
- Shahid Chamran University of Ahvaz
- Shiraz University
- Tarbiat Modares University
- University of Isfahan
- University of Tabriz
- University of Tehran

== Ireland ==
- Dublin Business School
- University College Dublin
- Ulster University

== Israel ==
- Bar-Ilan University

== Kenya ==
1. Moi University
2. Mt. Kenya University
3. Kenyatta University
4. Technical University of Kenya
5. Kisii University

== Nigeria ==
- Delta State University, Abraka
- Abubakar Tafawa Balewa University
- Ahmadu Bello University
- Babcock University
- University of Ibadan
- University of Ilorin
- University of Maiduguri
- University of Nigeria, Nsukka
- Nnamdi Azikiwe University
- Tai Solarin University of Education
- Federal University of Technology, Minna
- Abia State University Uturu
- Nnamdi Azikiwe University, Awka
- Chukwuemeka Odumegwu Ojukwu University, Uli
- Madonna University, Okija
- Ambrose Alli University
- Imo State University, Owerri
- Lead City University, Ibadan
- University of Benin
- Kogi State University, Anyigba
- Benson Idahosa University, Benin City
- Taraba State University, Jalingo
- Federal University, Dutsin-Ma, Katsina
- Bayero University Kano
- Federal University Dutse, Jigawa

== Pakistan ==
- University of the Punjab, Lahore
- The Islamia University of Bahawalpur, Bahawalpur
- University of Sargodha, Sargodha
- University of Peshawar, Peshawar
- University of Karachi, Karachi
- University of Balochistan
- Allama Iqbal Open University, Islamabad
- Khushal Khan Khattak University, Karak
- University of Sindh, Hyderabad
- Minhaj University, Lahore
- Superior University, Lahore
- Sarhad University, Peshawar

== Peru ==
- Pontifical Catholic University of Peru
- National University of San Marcos

== Portugal ==
- University of Lisbon
- University of Coimbra
- University of Porto

== Singapore ==
- Nanyang Technological University

== South Korea ==
- Chung-Ang University
- Ewha Womans University
- Kyonggi University
- Keimyung University
- Yonsei University
- Pusan University
- Daejin University

== South Africa ==
- Cape Town, University of
  - Department of Knowledge and Information Stewardship
- Durban University of Technology
  - Department of Information and Corporate Management
- Fort Hare, University of
  - Department of Library and Information Science
- Johannesburg, University of
  - Department of Information and Knowledge Management
- KwaZulu-Natal, University of
  - Information Studies
- Limpopo, University of
  - Department of Media, Communication and Information Studies
- Pretoria, University of
  - Department of Information Science
- South Africa, University of
  - Department of Information Science
- Walter Sisulu University
- Western Cape, University of
  - Department of Library and Information Science
- Zululand, University of
  - Department of Information Studies

== Spain ==
- Facultat d'Informació i Mitjans Audiovisuals (Universitat de Barcelona): founded at 1915 as Escola de Bibliotecàries.

== Sri Lanka ==
- University of Kelaniya

== Sweden ==
- Borås, University of

== Taiwan ==
- Fu Jen Catholic University
  - Department of Library and Information Science
- National Chengchi University
  - Graduate Institute of Library, Information and Archival Studies
- National Chung Hsing University
  - Graduate Institute of Library and Information Science
- National Taiwan University
  - Department of Library and Information Science
- National Taiwan Normal University
  - Graduate Institute of Library and Information Studies
- Tamkang University
  - Department of Information and Library Science

== United Kingdom ==
In the UK CILIP (the Chartered Institute of Library and Information Professionals) accredits university courses for professional qualification. This is a list of CILIP accredited institutions in the UK. Unless otherwise specified, the accredited courses are at Masters level.

- Aberystwyth University
- Coleg Llandrillo (FdA Library and Information Management, and BA (Hons) Library and Information Management)
- Cranfield University
- Glasgow, University of
- Manchester Metropolitan University
- Manchester, University of
- Robert Gordon University
- Ulster University
- Sheffield, University of
- Strathclyde, University of
- University College London
- West of England – Bristol, University of

== United States ==
State	School	Academic unit	Year accredited	ALA accreditation
Alabama	University of Alabama	School of Library and Information Studies	1972	yes
Arizona	University of Arizona	School of Information	1972	yes
California	San Jose State University	School of Information	1967	yes
California	University of California, Los Angeles	UCLA School of Education and Information Studies	1960	yes
California	University of Southern California	Marshall School of Business	2015	Conditional
Colorado	University of Denver	Morgridge College of Education	2003	yes
Connecticut	Southern Connecticut State University	Department of Information and Library Science	2018	Initial
Florida	Florida State University	School of Information	1951	yes
Florida	University of South Florida	School of Information	1973	yes
Georgia	Valdosta State University	Dewar College of Education and Human Services	2006	yes
Hawaii	University of Hawaii at Manoa	Information and Computer Sciences Department	1965	yes
Illinois	Chicago State University	Department of Computing, Information, and Mathematical Sciences & Technology	2019	Initial
Illinois	Dominican University	School of Information Studies	2003	yes
Illinois	University of Illinois at Urbana–Champaign	School of Information Sciences	1924	yes
Indiana	Indiana University Bloomington	School of Library and Information Science	1951	yes
Indiana	Indiana University–Purdue University Indianapolis (IUPUI)	School of Informatics and Computing	2019	yes
Iowa	University of Iowa	School of Library and Information Science	1969	yes
Kansas	Emporia State University	School of Library and Information Management	1964	yes
Kentucky	University of Kentucky	School of Information Science	1940	yes
Louisiana	Louisiana State University	School of Library and Information Science	1932	yes
Maryland	University of Maryland, College Park	College of Information Studies	1965	yes
Massachusetts	Simmons University	School of Library and Information Science	1924	yes
Michigan	University of Michigan	School of Information	1926	yes
Michigan	Wayne State University	School of Information Sciences	1965	yes
Minnesota	St. Catherine University	School of Business and Professional Studies	2009	yes
Mississippi	University of Southern Mississippi	School of Library and Information Science	1978	yes
Missouri	University of Missouri	School of Information Science and Learning Technologies	1967	yes
New Jersey	Rutgers University	Department of Library and Information Science	1954	yes
New York	Long Island University	Palmer School of Library and Information Science	1969	yes
New York	Pratt Institute	School of Information	1924	yes
New York	Queens College, CUNY	Graduate School of Library and Information Studies	1968	yes
New York	St. John's University	Department of Library and Information Science	1974	yes
New York	Syracuse University	School of Information Studies	1928	yes
New York	State University of New York at Albany	College of Emergency Preparedness, Homeland Security and Cybersecurity	1965	yes
New York	State University of New York at Buffalo	Department of Library and Information Science	1970	yes
North Carolina	East Carolina University	College of Education	2015	yes
North Carolina	North Carolina Central University	School of Library and Information Sciences	1973	yes
North Carolina	University of North Carolina at Chapel Hill	School of Information and Library Science	1932	yes
North Carolina	University of North Carolina at Greensboro	School of Education	1980	yes
Ohio	Kent State University	School of Information	1961	yes
Oklahoma	University of Oklahoma	School of Library and Information Studies	1930	yes
Pennsylvania	Clarion University of Pennsylvania	Department of Library Science	1974	yes
Pennsylvania	Drexel University	College of Computing and Informatics	1924	yes
Pennsylvania	Kutztown University of Pennsylvania	College of Education, Library and Learning Technologies Department	Never	no
Pennsylvania	University of Pittsburgh	School of Computing and Information	1962	yes
Puerto Rico	University of Puerto Rico	Escuela Graduada de Ciencias y Technologias de la Informacion	1988	yes
Rhode Island	University of Rhode Island	Harrington School of Communication and Media	1969	yes
South Carolina	University of South Carolina	College of Information and Communication	1972	yes
Tennessee	University of Tennessee	School of Information Sciences	1972	yes
Texas	Texas Woman's University	School of Library and Information Studies	1936	yes
Texas	University of North Texas	College of Information	1965	yes
Texas	University of Texas at Austin	School of Information	1951	yes
Virginia	Old Dominion University	Darden College of Education and Professional Studies	2022	Initial
Washington	University of Washington	Information School	1924	yes
Washington, D.C.	Catholic University of America	Department of Library and Information Science	1946	yes
Wisconsin	University of Wisconsin–Madison	Information School	1924	yes
Wisconsin	University of Wisconsin–Milwaukee	School of Information Studies	1974	yes

== See also ==
- List of information schools
