= Library science education in India =

Library science education in India has existed since the late 19th century. During the post-independence period, library-science education gained momentum with the assistance of the International Federation of Library Associations and Institutions and UNESCO, and is centered at the university level. Library and information science (LIS) increased in popularity during the early 1990s with the establishment of the Indira Gandhi National Open University (IGNOU). In addition to the IGNOU, several of the 13 state open universities provide LIS programmes. U.P Rajarshi Tandon Open University (UPRTOU) in Allahabad offers LIS degree programs through distance learning at the bachelor's, master's and doctoral level. Dr. B.R. Ambedkar Open University established in 1982 is offering BLISc, MLIS, M.Phil. & Ph.D. Programmes in Library Sciences.

== Notable library people in India ==
- S. R. Ranganathan, considered the father of library science in India
- Muskan Ahirwar, literacy advocate who created a community library in Bhopal at age 9
- Lalitha Lenin, a poet and children's author who was the Head of the Department of Library and Information Science at the University of Kerala, Thiruvananthapuram
- B. S. Kesavan, the first National Librarian after India became independent

== Notable institutions ==
Institution	Academic unit	Notes	Ref.
Indian Statistical Institute	Documentation Research and Training Centre (DRTC)	Founded by Dr. S. R. Ranganathan, considered the father of library science in India, in 1962.	
Delhi University	Department of Library and Information Science (DLIS)	Created the first Ph.D. in LIS in India. The diploma program began in 1947.	

== See also ==
- List of schools of Library and Information Science in India
- Education for librarianship
