= List of information schools =

This list of information schools, sometimes abbreviated to iSchools, includes members of the iSchools organization. The iSchools organization reflects a consortium of over 130 information schools across the globe.

== History ==
The first iSchools Caucus was formed in 1988 by Syracuse, Pittsburgh, and Drexel and was called the Gang of Three (sometimes gang of four with Rutgers). Syracuse renamed the School of Library Science as the School of Information Studies in 1974, and is considered as the first “iSchool” in history. The group was formally named "the iSchools Caucus" or more casually, the iCaucus. By 2003, the group expanded to include the Universities of Michigan, Washington, Illinois, UNC, Florida State, Indiana, and Texas, and was called the Gang of Ten.

The current iSchools Caucus organization was formalized by 2005, with additions of UC Berkeley, UC Irvine, UCLA, Penn State, Georgia Tech, Maryland, Toronto, Carnegie Mellon and Singapore Management University.

== iSchools organization ==
The iSchools promote an interdisciplinary approach to understanding the opportunities and challenges of information management, with a core commitment to concepts like universal access and user-centered organization of information. The field is concerned broadly with questions of design and preservation across information spaces, from digital and virtual spaces such as online communities, social networking, the World Wide Web, and databases to physical spaces such as libraries, museums, collections, and other repositories. "School of Information", "Department of Information Studies", or "Information Department" are often the names of the participating organizations.

Degree programs at iSchools include course offerings in areas such as information architecture, design, policy, and economics; knowledge management, user experience design, and usability; preservation and conservation; librarianship and library administration; the sociology of information; and human-computer interaction and computer science.

=== Leadership ===
The executive committee of the iSchools is made up of the current chair (Ina Fourie, University of Pretoria, South Africa), past chair (Gillian Oliver, Monash University, Australia) and the chair elect (Javed Mostafa, University of Toronto Canada), plus representatives from the three regions (North America, Europe, and Asia-Pacific). The current executive director is Slava Sterzer.

== Member institutions ==
Between 2010 and 2026, the organization expanded globally beyond North America, growing to 133 member schools as of March 2026. For an updated and complete list of member schools, please visit the member database of the iSchools.

Institution	Academic unit	Country
University of Amsterdam	Graduate School of Humanities (Media Studies)	Netherlands
University at Albany	Department of Information Sciences and Technology	US
University of British Columbia	School of Library, Archival, and Information Studies	Canada
University of Borås	Swedish School of Library and Information Science	Sweden
University of California, Berkeley	School of Information	US
University of California, Irvine	Donald Bren School of Information and Computer Sciences	US
University of California, Los Angeles	School of Education and Information Studies	US
University of Colorado, Boulder	College of Communication, Media, Design and Information	US
Carnegie Mellon University	Heinz College of Information Systems and Public Policy	US
Indian Statistical Institute	Documentation Research and Training Centre	India
Drexel University	College of Computing and Informatics	US
University College Dublin	School of Information and Library Studies	Ireland
Florida State University	College of Communication and Information	US
Georgia Institute of Technology	College of Computing	US
University of Glasgow	Humanities Advanced Technology and Information Institute	UK
Humboldt-Universität zu Berlin	Berlin School of Library and Information Science	Germany
University of Illinois Urbana-Champaign	School of Information Sciences	US
Indiana University	School of Informatics and Computing	US
University of Kentucky	College of Communications & Information Studies	US
University College London	Department of Information Studies	UK
Long Island University	Palmer School of Library and Information Science	US
Manchester Metropolitan University	Department of Languages, Information and Communications	UK
University of Maryland	College of Information Studies	US
University of Maryland - Baltimore	Department of Information Systems	US
McGill University	School of Information Studies	Canada
University of Melbourne	Melbourne School of Information	Australia
University of Michigan	The School of Information	US
Nanjing University	School of Information Management	China
University of North Carolina at Chapel Hill	School of Information and Library Science	US
University of North Carolina at Charlotte	College of Computing and Informatics	US
University of North Texas	College of Information	US
Northumbria University	Computing, Engineering & Information Sciences	UK
Universidade Nova de Lisboa	NOVA Information Management School	Portugal
OsloMet – Oslo Metropolitan University	Department of Archivistics, Library and Information Science	Norway
Pennsylvania State University	College of Information Sciences and Technology	US
University of Pittsburgh	School of Computing and Information	US
University of Porto	Faculty of Engineering in cooperation with the Faculty of Arts	Portugal
Pratt Institute	School of Information	US
University of Regensburg	Institute for Information and Media, Language and Culture	Germany
Rutgers, the State University of New Jersey	School of Communication and Information	US
Future University in Egypt	Faculty of Economics & Political Science	Egypt
University of Sheffield	School of Information, Journalism and Communication	UK
Simmons University	School of Library and Information Science	US
Singapore Management University	School of Information Systems	Singapore
University of South Australia	School of Information Technology and Mathematical Sciences	Australia
University of South Florida	School of Information	US
Sungkyunkwan University	Library and Information Science	South Korea
Syracuse University	School of Information Studies	US
Tampere University	School of Communication Sciences	Finland
University of Texas, Austin	School of Information	US
University of Toronto	Faculty of Information	Canada
Kyushu University	Department of Library Science, Graduate School of Integrated Frontier Sciences	Japan
University of Tsukuba	Graduate School of Library, Information, and Media Studies	Japan
University of Washington	Information School	US
University of Wisconsin–Madison	Information School	US
University of Wisconsin–Milwaukee	School of Information Studies	US
Wuhan University	School of Information Management	China
Yonsei University	Department of Library and Information Science	South Korea
Yonsei University	Graduate School of Information	South Korea
Chung-Ang University	Department of Library and Information Science	South Korea
University of Nebraska-Omaha	College of Information Science and Technology	US
Makerere University	The College of Computing and Information Sciences	Uganda
Charles III University of Madrid	Library Science and Documentation Department	Spain
Hacettepe University	Department of Information Management	Turkey
Stratford University	School of Computer Information Systems	US
University of Arizona	School of Information	US
University of the Philippines - Diliman	School of Library and Information Studies	Philippines
Bar-Ilan University	Department of Information Science and Applied Artificial Intelligence	Israel

== iConferences ==
Members of the iSchools organize a regular academic conference, known as the iConference, hosted by a different member institution each year.

1. September 2005: Pennsylvania State University
2. October 2006: University of Michigan
3. February 2008: University of California, Los Angeles
4. February 2009: University of North Carolina
5. February 2010: University of Illinois at Urbana-Champaign
6. February 2011: University of Washington, Seattle
7. February 2012: University of Toronto
8. February 2013: University of North Texas
9. March 2014: Humboldt-Universität zu Berlin
10. March 2015: University of California, Irvine
11. March 2016: Drexel University
12. March 2017: Wuhan University
13. March 2018: University of Sheffield and Northumbria University
14. March 2019: University of Maryland
15. March 2020: University of Borås (virtual only)
16. March 2021: Renmin University of China (virtual only)
17. February/March 2022: University of Texas at Austin, University College Dublin & Kyushu University (virtual only)
18. March 2023: Universitat Oberta de Catalunya
19. March 2024: Jilin University
20. March 2025: Indiana University
21. March/April 2026: Edinburgh Napier University
22. 2027: Victoria University of Wellington

== Other schools of information ==
Other information schools and programs include:

- Documentation Research and Training Centre, Indian Statistical Institute, Bangalore
- San Jose State University, School of Information
- University of Southern California Library Science Degree
- Ankara University, Department of Information and Records Management, Ankara/Turkey
- Marmara University, Department of Information and Records Management, Istanbul/Turkey
- University of Kelaniya, Department of Library and Information Science, Kelaniya/Sri Lanka
- University of Colombo, National Institute of Library and Information Science (NILIS), Colombo/Sri Lanka
- Chicago State University, Department of Information Studies

== See also ==
- List of Library Science schools
