= List of schools of Library and Information Science in India =

This is list of library science and information science schools in India.

== List of Library and Information Science Schools in India ==
Institution	Academic unit	Notes	Ref.
Indian Statistical Institute	Documentation Research and Training Centre	Founded by S. R. Ranganathan, considered the father of library science in India, in 1962.	
Jamia Millia Islamia	Department of Library and Information Science		
University of Calicut	Department of Library and Information Science Calicut	Hosts CALIBER Conference; C. H. Mohammed Koya Library	
Aligarh Muslim University	Department of Library and Information Science	The department runs one of the largest university libraries in Asia, the Maulana Azad Library.	
Panjab University			
Pondicherry University			
Babasaheb Bhimrao Ambedkar University			
Calcutta University			
Gauhati University			
Andhra University			
Sri Krishnadevaraya University			
Sri Venkateswara University			
Pandit Ravishankar Shukla University			
Shivaji University			
Maharaja Sayajirao University of Baroda			
Gujarat Vidyapith			
North East Frontier Technical University			
Delhi University	Department of Library and Information Science (DLIS)	Created the first Ph.D. in LIS in India. The diploma program began in 1947.	
Himalayan University			
Arunachal University of Studies			
Admerit College			
Patna University			
University of Jammu			
University of Kashmir			
University of Kerala	Department of Library and Information Science		
University of Kashmir			
Vijayanagara Sri Krishnadevaraya University			
Rani Channamma University, Belagavi			
Vikram University			
Jiwaji University			
Chaudhary Charan Singh Post Graduate College			
Vinoba Bhave University			
Rabindra Bharati University			
University of Mysore			
Manipur University			
Tripura University			
Mizoram University			
Jadavpur University			
Tripura University			
Mizoram University			
Jadavpur University			
Central University of Haryana			
Central University of Tamil Nadu			
Central University of Himachal Pradesh			
Banaras Hindu University			
Central University of Gujarat			
University of Mysore			
University of Madras			
Tata Institute of Social Sciences			
Hari Singh Gour University			
North Eastern Hill University			
Bangalore University, Bengaluru			
Gulbarga University, Kalburgi			
Karnataka University, Dharwad			
Tumkur University, Tumkur			
Bangalore North University, Kolara			
Akkamahadevi Women's University, Vijayapura			
Kuvempu University, Shivamogga			
Govt. Maharani Laxmi Bai Girls P.G. College			
Sarojini Naidu Govt. Girls PG (Autonomous) College			
Gourbanga University			
Rashtrasant Tukadoji Maharaj Nagpur University	Department of Library and Information Science		
Yashwantrao Chavan Maharashtra Open University (YCMOU), Nashik	Knowledge Resource Centre		

== See also ==
- Library science education in India
- List of library science schools
- List of information schools
