= Peter Schirmbacher =

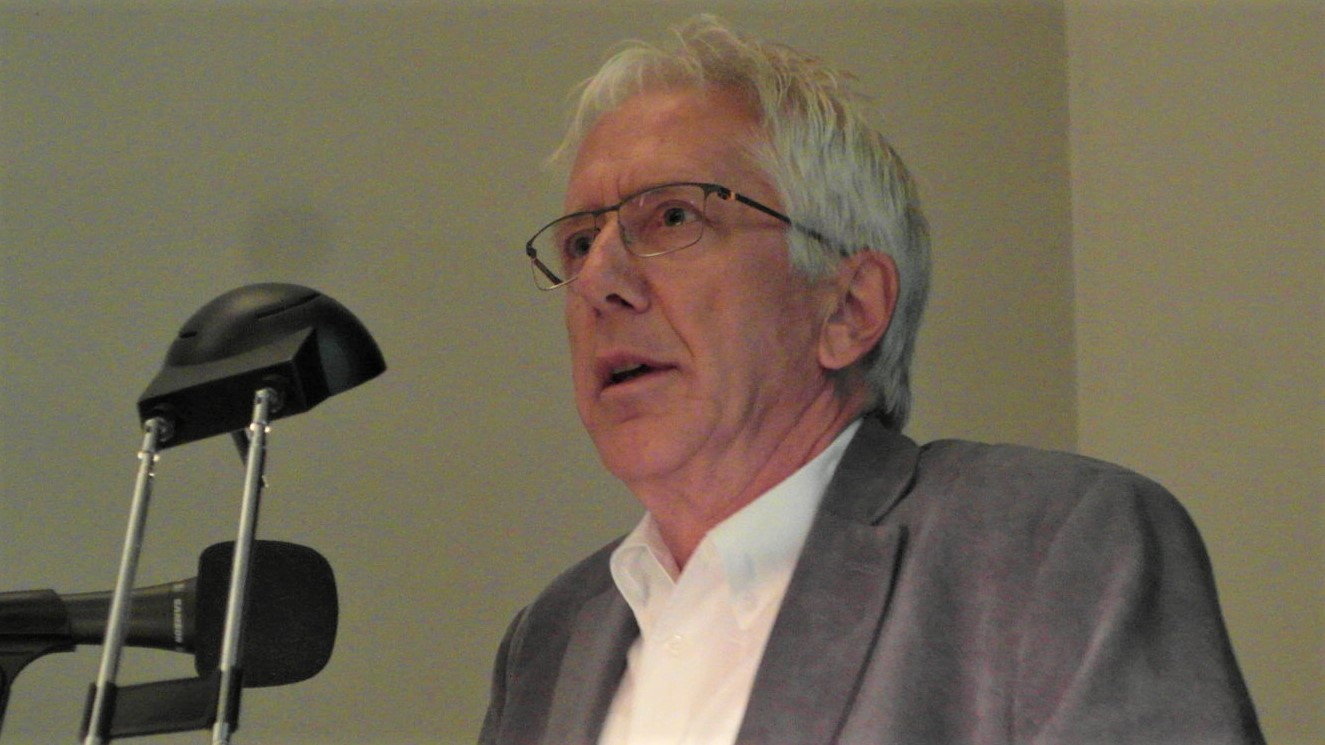
Schirmbacher in 2017

Peter Schirmbacher (born 1951) is a German information scientist. He heads the Computer and Media Services department (computer center) of Humboldt-Universitaet zu Berlin and he is a professor of Information Management at Berlin School of Library and Information Science.

== Career ==
After studying economics at the Humboldt-Universitaet, Schirmbacher went on to work for the university's data center and that of the German Academy of Sciences at Berlin (GDR). He received his doctorate in applied computer science for his thesis Die Struktur und Grundsätze der Gestaltung von rechnergestützten Leitungsinformationssystemen an Universitäten und Hochschulen (structure and principles for designing a computer-assisted information infrastructure for universities and colleges) in 1989. Since 1990 he has been the head of the Computer and Media Services department of the Humboldt-Universitaet. He has also been a professor at the Berlin School of Library and Information Science since 2006.

== Professional work ==
Schirmbacher gained recognition for innovative projects in the fields of Electronic publishing and Digital preservation. His work received support from the Deutsche Forschungsgemeinschaft (DFG), the Federal Ministry of Education and Research of Germany (BMBF) and the European Union. Among the projects he has led or contributed to are:

- "Dissertationen online",
- "Scope",
- "LuKII"
- "LAUDATIO" (2011-2014)
- "MetaImage" (2009-2011)
- "CARPET" (2008-2012)
- "OA-Statistik" (2008-2013)
- "DOARC" (2009-2011)
- "OA-Policies" (2008-2009)
- "OA-Netzwerk" (2007-2012)
- "HyperImage" (2006-2008)
- "e-KoKon – e-Kompetenz im Kontext" (2005-2008)
- "DissOnline Tutor" (2005-2007)
- EU project "reUSE" (2004-2006)
- "Nestor (archiving network) - Aufbau eines Kompetenznetzwerkes zu Langzeitarchivierung (2003-2006)
- Projects on "Aufbau eines Multimedia Lehr- und Lernzentrums" (2002-2006)
- "Open Archives Forum" (2001-2003)
- "XML-Portal für multimediale Objekte..." (2001-2003)
- "ProPrint" (2000-2002)
- "Sicher vernetzte Universitätsverwaltung" (1999-2001)
- "Elektronische Publikation von Dissertationen der Humboldt-Universität" (1997-2000)
- "Firewall - Kernstück des Verwaltungsnetzes" (1997-1999)

== Professional Involvement ==
Schirmbacher is involved in the following professional bodies and organizations:

- Since 2011 spokesman for Nestor - CoE digital preservation
- Since 2011 chair of the CoE "Bibliometrie für die deutsche Wissenschaft"
- Since 2003 board of directors "Networked Digital Library of Theses and Dissertations (NDLTD)"
- Since 2003 advisory board "DissOnline" of the German National Library
- Since 1999 founding member and currently steering committee member Deutsche Initiative für Netzwerkinformation (DINI)
- Since 1991 member of "Arbeitskreis der Leiter wissenschaftlicher Rechenzentren", now: "Zentren für Kommunikation und Informationsverarbeitung in Forschung und Lehre e.V." (ZKI)
- Since 1990 "Verein zur Förderung eines Deutschen Forschungsnetzes" (DFN-Verein), representing the Humboldt-Universitaet
