= List of Beta Phi Mu chapters =

Beta Phi Mu is an American honor society for library and information science and information technology. The following list of Beta Phi Mu chapters indicates active chapters in bold and inactive chapters in italics.

Chapter	Charter date and range	Institution	Location	Status	Ref.
**Alpha**	August 1948	University of Illinois Urbana-Champaign	Champaign, Illinois	Active	
Beta	1956	University of Southern California	Los Angeles, California	Inactive	
**Gamma**	1957	Florida State University	Tallahassee, Florida	Active	
Delta	1957	Loughborough University	Loughborough, England	Inactive	
**Epsilon**	1957	University of North Carolina at Chapel Hill	Chapel Hill, North Carolina	Active	
**Pi Lambda Sigma**	1959	Syracuse University	Syracuse, New York	Active	(Note: The chapter formed from Pi Lambda Sigma, a local library honor society founded in 1903.)
Zeta	1960	Clark Atlanta University	Atlanta, Georgia	Inactive	
**Theta**	1962	Pratt Institute	New York City, New York	Active	
**Iota**	1964	Catholic University of America	Washington, D.C.	Active	
**Iota**	1964	University of Maryland, College Park	College Park, Maryland	Active	
Kappa	1966-1983	Western Michigan University	Kalamazoo, Michigan	Inactive	
**Lambda**	1967	University of Oklahoma	Norman, Oklahoma	Active	
Mu	1967	University of Michigan	Ann Arbor, Michigan	Inactive	
Nu	1967	Columbia University	New York City, New York	Inactive	
**Xi**	1968	University of Hawaiʻi at Mānoa	Honolulu, Hawaii	Active	
**Omicron**	1970	Rutgers University–New Brunswick	New Brunswick, New Jersey	Active	
**Pi**	1967	University of Pittsburgh	Pittsburgh, Pennsylvania	Active	
Rho	August 29, 1968	Kent State University	Kent, Ohio	Inactive	
**Sigma**	1969	Drexel University	Philadelphia, Pennsylvania	Active	
Tau	1969-1983	State University of New York at Geneseo	Geneseo, New York	Inactive	
Upsilon	July 31, 1970	University of Kentucky	Lexington, Kentucky	Inactive	
Phi	1970-1985	University of Denver	Denver, Colorado	Inactive	
Chi	May 26, 1971	Indiana University Bloomington	Bloomington, Indiana	Inactive	
**Psi**	1971	University of Missouri	Columbia, Missouri	Active	
**Omega**	1972	San Jose State University	San Jose, California	Active	
Beta Alpha	1971	Queens College, City University of New York	Flushing, Queens, New York	Inactive	
**Beta Beta**	1973	Simmons University	Boston, Massachusetts	Active	
Beta Gamma	1973	University of Oregon	Eugene, Oregon	Inactive	
**Beta Delta**	1973	University at Buffalo	Buffalo, New York	Active	
**Beta Epsilon**	1973	Emporia State University	Emporia, Kansas	Active	
Beta Zeta	1974	Louisiana State University	Baton Rouge, Louisiana	Inactive	
Beta Eta	1974	University of Texas at Austin	Austin, Texas	Inactive	
Beta Theta	1975	Brigham Young University	Provo, Utah	Inactive	
**Beta Iota**	February 29, 1976	University of Rhode Island	Kingston, Rhode Island	Active	
**Beta Kappa**	November 15, 1975	University of Alabama	Tuscaloosa, Alabama	Active	
**Beta Lambda**	1976	Texas Woman's University/University of North Texas	Denton, Texas	Active	
Beta Mu	1976	Palmer School of Library and Information Science/ LIU Post	Brookville, New York	Inactive	
Beta Nu	1977	St. John's University	Jamaica, Queens, New York	Inactive	
Beta Xi	October 8, 1976	North Carolina Central University	Durham, North Carolina	Inactive	
Beta Omicron	1977	University of Tennessee	Knoxville, Tennessee	Inactive	
**Beta Pi**	November 5, 1977	University of Arizona	Tucson, Arizona	Active	
**Beta Rho**	1978	University of Wisconsin–Milwaukee	Milwaukee, Wisconsin	Active	
Beta Sigma	May 9, 1980	Clarion University of Pennsylvania	Clarion, Pennsylvania	Inactive	
Beta Tau	June 5, 1979-1985	Wayne State University	Detroit, Michigan	Inactive	
Beta Upsilon	October 4, 1976-1981	Alabama A&M University	Normal, Alabama	Inactive	
**Beta Phi**	1980	University of South Florida	Tampa, Florida	Active	(Note: Formerly at the University of South Florida Sarasota–Manatee))
Beta Chi		Southern Connecticut State University	New Haven, Connecticut	Inactive	
**Beta Psi**	June 9, 1981	University of Southern Mississippi	Hattiesburg, Mississippi	Active	
**Beta Omega**	1982	University of South Carolina	Columbia, South Carolina	Active	
Beta Beta Alpha	1985	University of California, Los Angeles	Los Angeles, California	Inactive	
Beta Beta Gamma	October 21, 1983	Dominican University	River Forest, Illinois	Inactive	(Note: Formerly called Rosary College)
Beta Beta Delta	August 22, 1983	Cologne city-wide	Cologne, Germany	Inactive	
Beta Beta Epsilon	May 3, 1984	University of Wisconsin–Madison	Madison, Wisconsin	Inactive	
Beta Beta Zeta	May 4, 1984	University of North Carolina at Greensboro	Greensboro, North Carolina	Inactive	
**Beta Beta Theta**	June 17, 1988	University of Iowa	Iowa City, Iowa	Active	
Beta Beta Iota		State University of New York at Albany	Albany, New York	Inactive	
Beta Beta Kappa		University of Puerto Rico	San Juan, Puerto Rico	Inactive	
Beta Beta Lambda		University of Washington	Seattle, Washington	Inactive	
**Beta Beta Mu**		Valdosta State University	Valdosta, Georgia	Active	
**Beta Beta Nu**		University of North Texas	Denton, Texas	Active	
**Beta Beta Xi**		St. Catherine University	Saint Paul, Minnesota	Active	
**Beta Beta Omicron**		East Carolina University	Greenville, North Carolina	Active	
**Beta Beta Pi**		University of Central Missouri	Warrensburg, Missouri	Active	
**Omicron Delta Upsilon**		Old Dominion University	Norfolk, Virginia	Active	
?		Duke University	Durham, North Carolina	Inactive	
?		University of Maryland Eastern Shore	Princess Anne, Maryland	Inactive	
