= College of Communication =

College of Communication may refer to:

- Diederich College of Communication at Marquette University
- P.U.P. College of Communication of the Polytechnic University of the Philippines
- London College of Communication, formerly the London College of Printing, and briefly London College of Printing and Distributive Trades
- Edward R. Murrow College of Communication of Washington State University
- Boston University College of Communication
- University of Texas at Austin College of Communication
- Donald P. Bellisario College of Communications at Pennsylvania State University

It may also refer to:

- Ravensbourne College of Design and Communication in the United Kingdom
- UPLB College of Development Communication of the University of the Philippines Los Baños
- Budapest College of Communication and Business in Hungary
- Florida State University School of Communication a School within the College of Communication and Information
- College of Mass Communication & Media Arts at Southern Illinois University Carbondale, USA
- Henry W. Grady College of Journalism and Mass Communication of the University of Georgia, USA
- Gaylord College of Journalism and Mass Communication of the University of Oklahoma
- Towson University College of Fine Arts and Communication
