= School of Information Sciences, Wayne State University =

The Wayne State University School of Information Sciences (SIS) is a school of information science at Wayne State University in Detroit. Prior to August 2017, the school was known as the School of Library and Information Science. The school has been accredited by the American Library Association since 1967 and offers programs leading to master's degrees in both library and information science and the science of information management. In 2017, the school was ranked 22nd by the U.S. News & World Report Best Global University Ranking among library and information science studies programs.

== History ==
The school dates to 1918 when the Detroit Normal Training School, as Wayne was then known, began offering librarianship classes. In the 1930s, the school's teacher training program began issuing bachelor's degrees with a minor in library science.

In 1967, Wayne's library and information science program, then part of Wayne's College of Education, was accredited by the American Library Association to grant master's degrees in library and information science.

In 1993, Wayne's library and information science program gained independence as the Library and Information Science Program. Robert Holley served as the director of the program from approximately 1993 to 1998. He was preceded by Patricia Senn Breivik and succeeded by Joseph J. Mika.

In 1997, Wayne opened a new 300,000-square foot undergraduate library, built at a cost of $37-million.

The program became the School of Library and Information Science in 2009. In August 2017, the school changed its name to the School of Information Sciences.

Sandra Yee was the school's dean from 2001 until her retirement in July 2017. In 2004, Yee spoke in opposition to the Patriot Act, arguing that it "could have a chilling effect on research and intellectual freedom, which are critical to our nation’s freedom."

Jon Cawthorn was appointed as dean of the school effective August 1, 2017. Cawthorn was previously the dean of libraries at West Virginia University.

== Enrollment and programs ==
The school has an enrollment of 426 students in its graduate degrees and certificates programs. Two master's degrees, two joint degrees and four graduate certificates are offered. The Master of Library and Information Science (MLIS) program has three areas of study - library services, archives and digital content management; and information management. The Master of Science in Information Management has five specializations - software tools, web-based information services, data analytics, health and scientific data management and user experience. Graduate certificates include archival administration, information management, library and information science, and public services to children and young adults.

== Rankings ==
In the 2017 edition of the U.S. News & World Report Best Global University Ranking, Wayne State's School of Information Sciences was ranked No. 22 out of 62 accredited library and information science programs.
