= Master of Library and Information Science =

Type of master's degree

The Master of Library and Information Science (MLIS) is a master's degree that combines two interdisciplinary academic disciplines. Library science is applied information science and a subfield of information science. This degree focuses on information management. It is also the most common degree for professional librarian positions in the United States. The MLIS was created after the older Master of Library Science (MLS) was reformed to reflect the information science and technology needs of the field. According to the American Library Association (ALA), "ALA-accredited degrees have [had] various names such as Master of Information Studies, Master of Arts, Master of Librarianship, Master of Library and Information Studies, or Master of Science. The degree name has been determined by the program. The [ALA] Committee for Accreditation evaluates programs based on their adherence to the Standards for Accreditation of Master's Programs in Library and Information Science, not based on the name of the degree."

Admission to MLIS programs normally require holding a bachelor's degree in any academic discipline and library schools encourage applications from people with diverse academic backgrounds.

In the United Kingdom, it is more common for a vocational degree in library and information science to bear the standard designation MA or MSc. In most Commonwealth universities, bachelor's and master's programs have been merged to create the MLIS/MLISc degree. IFLA committees have discussed global standards for librarian credentials.

In Canada, ALA-accredited schools of library and information science sometimes grant MI (Master of Information) degrees, though some institutions retain the designation "MLIS" or "MISt". However, regardless of the name of the degree conferred, virtually every school of library and information studies in Canada comprises programming for library science, information science, archives, and museum studies.

== Schools ==
The MLIS or MLS degree is usually acquired from an accredited library school. ALA accredits 67 programs at 65 institutions across the United States, Canada, Puerto Rico, and the United Kingdom. ALA also offers an overview of international degrees in library and information science.

The ALA website provides "Guidelines for Choosing a Master's Program in Library and Information Studies" and discusses how to choose an ALA-accredited program, whether to choose a program specialization, and general program admission requirements.

Many ALA-accredited programs provide distance-learning opportunities for students through a variety of delivery methods (e.g. online courses). In some cases, students can complete the entire program at a distance; in other cases, some on-campus courses or regional residency may be required.

== Curriculum ==
The MLIS/MLS curriculum can vary widely. Typically, both theoretical and practical components are included. A comprehensive measurement of the library student's mastery of the field occurs during the last semester of the program and consists of a research project, often tied to a practicum or internship, or a master's thesis. Some schools have stringent course requirements while others are more flexible and offer a wide variety of electives.

Core courses typically focus on the methods of organizing information (including established cataloging and library classification systems), the philosophy and ethics of information dissemination (including reference services, privacy rights, and balancing the needs of various stakeholders: publishers, the public, and the government), and the principles of establishing and managing physical and digital resources, particularly physical and digital libraries, archives, and museums.

The "Information Science" component of the degree is composed of the acquisition of technology skills similar to those found in a computer science or related degree program. Courses in the program that focus on information science and computer science include: data science, data analytics, and data management; institutional repository management; digital libraries and digital preservation; information systems and information architecture; networking hardware and software skills required to manage a computer network; integrated library systems utilizing relational databases and database design; mastery of multiple computer programming languages; web design, metadata and semantic web technologies; automation and natural language processing (NLP); informatics; as well as taxonomy (general), and ontology (information science).

Most programs offer at least one statistics-driven course in research methodology for those aspiring to the Ph.D. as well as management courses for those hoping to progress to leadership positions within libraries.

== Careers ==
People who earn MLIS degrees take on many different roles in many different kinds of environments—in libraries and "beyond the stacks." According to the ALA, "Librarians work in museums, hospitals, businesses, and public libraries. In their work, librarians research, instruct, and connect people to technology. Librarians build websites, digitize archives, and manage social media. Librarians work with people of all ages, connecting them to information, learning and the community." The association's LibraryCareers.org site collects information about library and information science careers, work environments, and more.

Many with MLIS degrees use their professional skills in positions without "librarian" in the job title. The San Jose State University School of Information publishes an annual research report on emerging career trends for information professionals, providing a snapshot of job titles in the field.

== Professional organizations ==
- American Library Association (ALA)
- Australian Library and Information Association (ALIA)
- Canadian Federation of Library Associations (CFLA)
- Chartered Institute of Library and Information Professionals (CILIP)
- International Federation of Library Associations and Institutions (IFLA)
- Public Library Association (PLA)
- Society of American Archivists (SAA)
- Special Libraries Association (SLA)

Each of these organizations includes various divisions and/or interest groups that focus on particular specialties or interests.

== See also ==
- Library school
- Library science
- List of library science schools
