= Muskan Ahirwar =

Indian educator and librarian (born 2006–07)

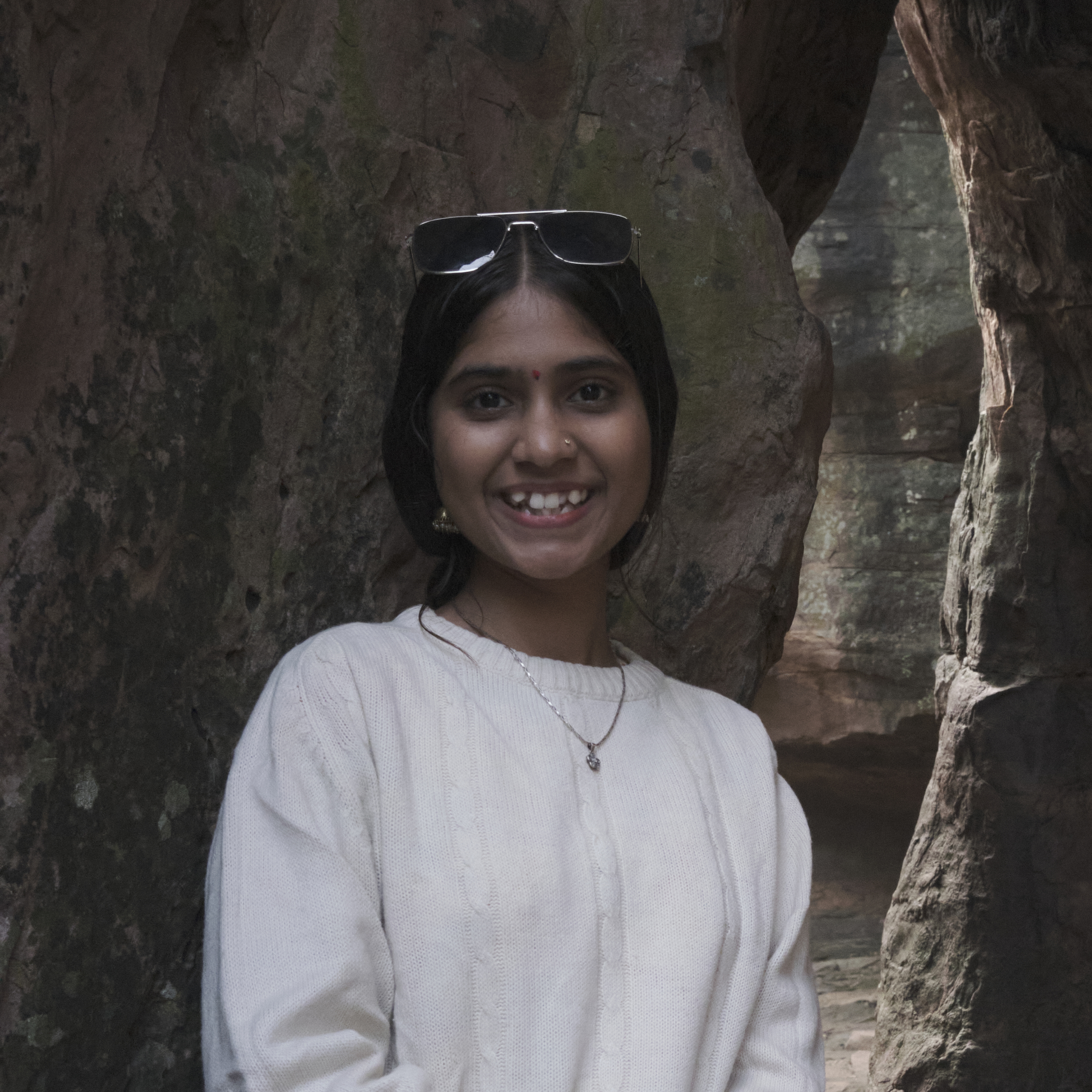
- Muskan in 2023
- Born: 2006 or 2007 (age 18–19)
- Occupation(s): Educator and librarian

Muskan Ahirwar (born 2006 or 2007) is an Indian educator and librarian from Bhopal, India. In 2016, when she was 9 years old, she created a community library for children in the worker's colony where she lives, named Kitabi Masti ("fun with books") in Hindi. The library has since moved to a dedicated space and has been expanded to over 3,000 books. She has been given several awards for her work including by NITI Aayog, Hyderabad Literature Festival, and the Delhi Commission for Protection of Child Rights.

== Kitabi Masti ==
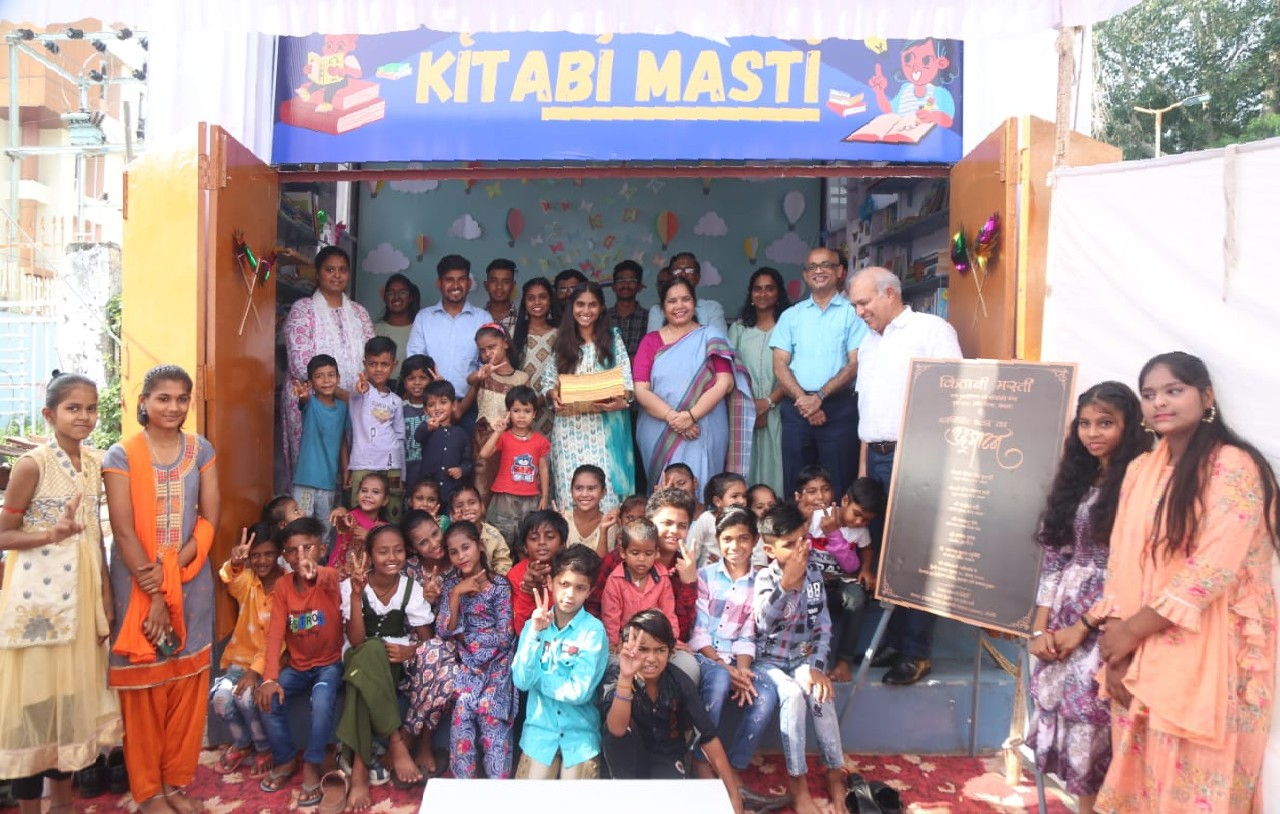
Kitabi Masti (Muskan standing, centre) with children who use the library

The library, Kitabi Masti ("fun with books"), is built in the common space of Durganagar worker's colony in Arera Hills of Bhopal where Muskan lives. She started the library on 26 January 2016 with her sister Neha to serve the children who live in the area. The library began with 25 books hung on a string outside her house. "I was nine years old when I started this library ... I had collected some books which I displayed outside my house by hanging them on a rope. The colourful images fascinated the children in the locality. They started visiting my house regularly to read the books. This is how my interest in books started to grow."

In 2017, Muskan was awarded a grant by Madhya Pradesh Chief Minister Shivraj Singh Chouhan to fund development of the library. The library has since moved to a dedicated space which has been renovated using waste materials by architecture students from the National Association of Students of Architecture. The library has been expanded to over 3,000 books through contributions of books from places in India as well as the United States, South Africa, and other countries.

== Awards ==
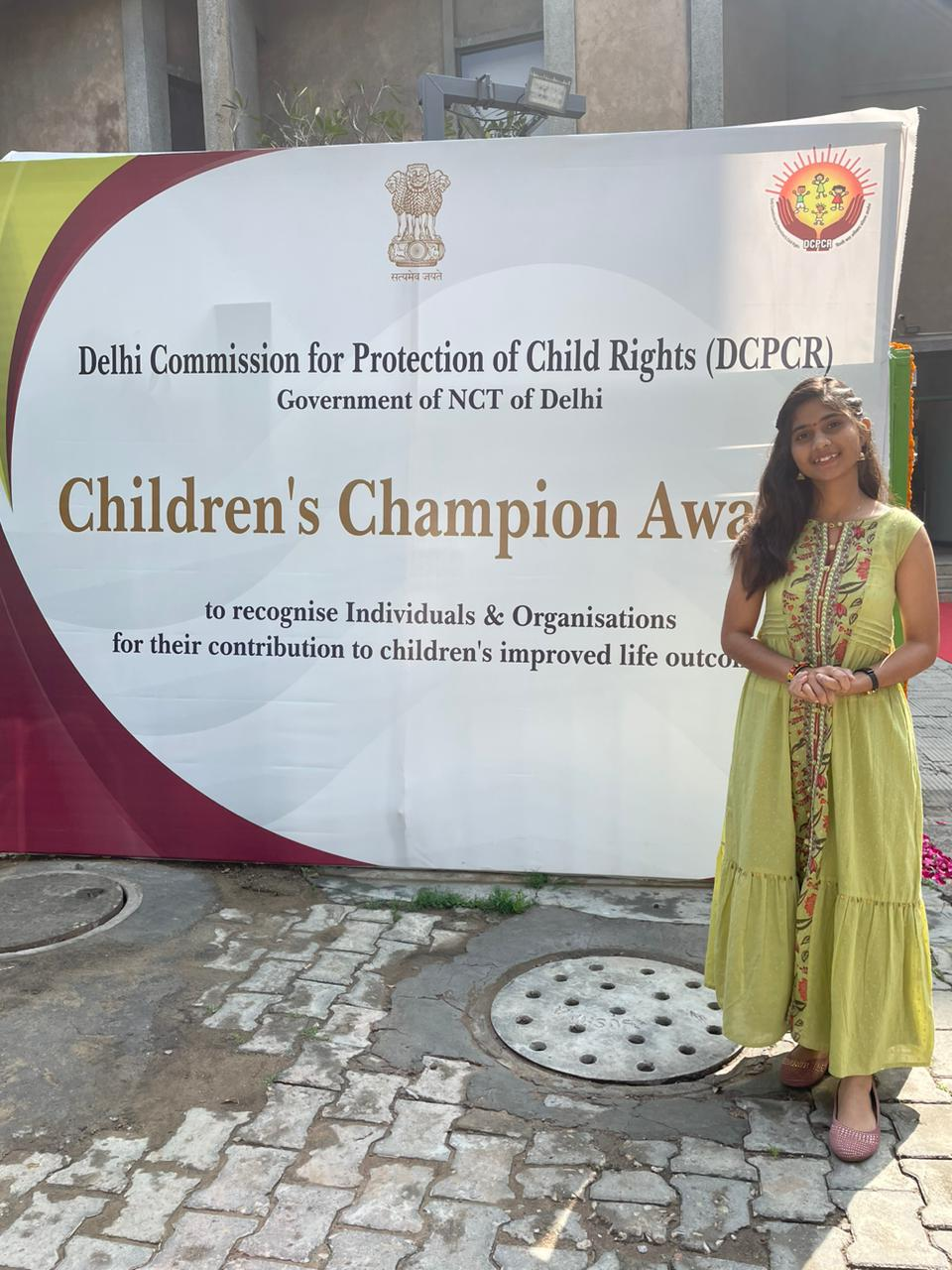
Muskan at the Children's Champion Awards 2023

Muskan has been recognised with several awards for her work and has also been commended by Madhya Pradesh UNICEF Field Office Chief, Michael Juma.

- 2016: Women Transforming Award by NITI Aayog for her work
- 2016: Thought Leader award by NITI Ayog in New Delhi
- 2018: Princess Diana Award, Sushiksha Awards
- 2019: Food4Thought Foundation's Indian Reading Olympiad, category "I am bond" under 18, award
- 2019: India Reading Olympiad, Hyderabad Literature Festival
- 2020: Devi Awards Indore countdown series
- 2023: Children's Champion Award by the Delhi Commission for Protection of Child Rights
- 2023: Vivekanand State Youth Award
