= Hauptgebaude =

- U.S. National Register of Historic Places
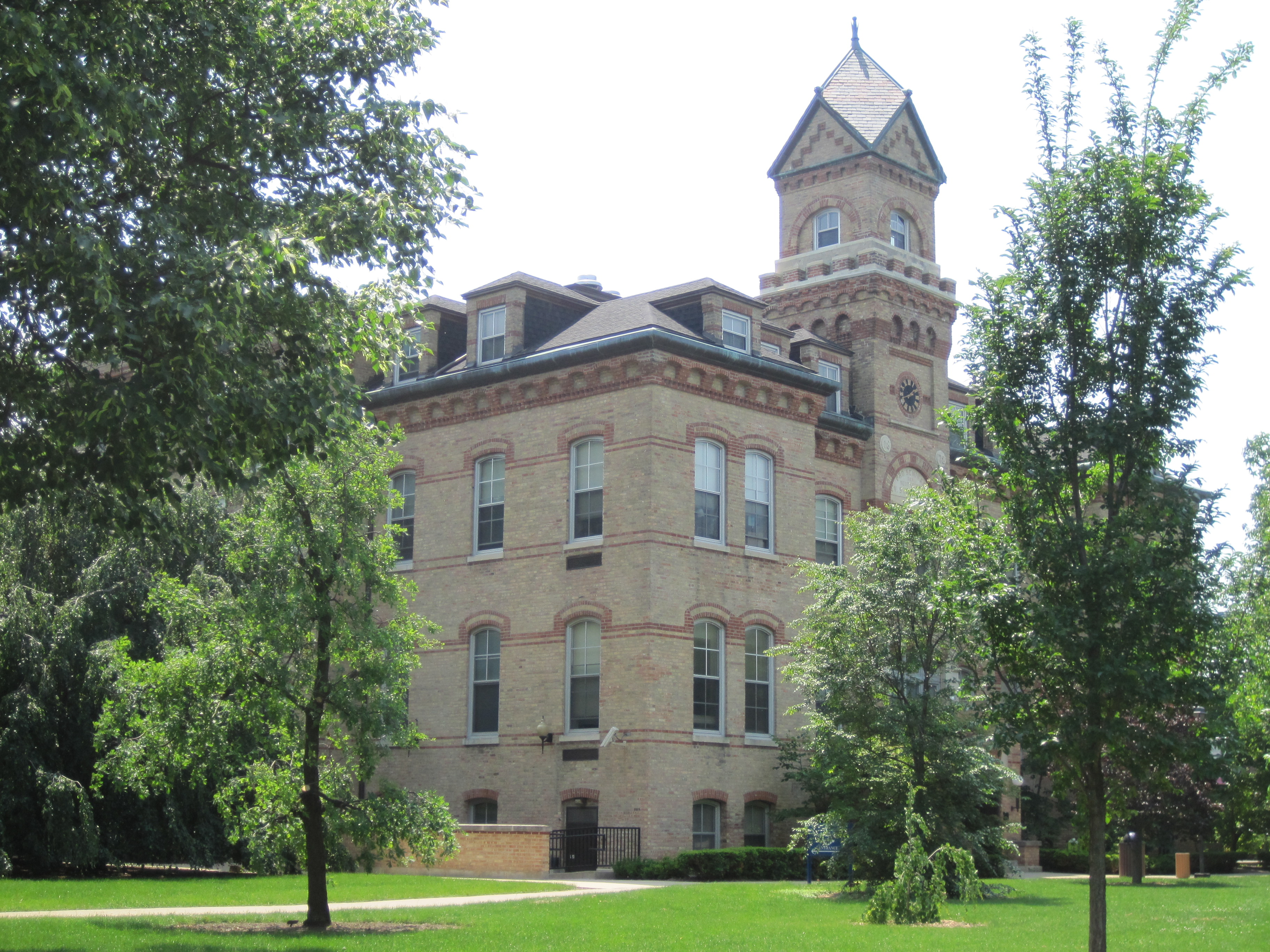
- Elmhurst Old Main in 2011

- Location within Illinois Location within the United States
- Location: 190 Prospect St. Elmhurst, DuPage County, Illinois, U.S.
- Coordinates: 41°53′45″N 87°56′43″W
- Built: 1878; 148 years ago
- Architectural style: Gothic Revival
- NRHP reference No.: 76002162
- Added to NRHP: August 13, 1976

Hauptgebaude, (German: [ˈhaʊ̯ptɡəˌbɔɪ̯də]; lit. 'main building') also known as Old Main, was the predecessor to Elmhurst University in Elmhurst, Illinois. The three-story building was constructed in 1878 as a gymnasium style of school, reflecting the German heritage of the local residents. The new building allowed the school to increase its enrollment to 103 students in its first year. Classes in the Hauptgebaude were solely taught in German until 1917. In 1919, the school became accredited as a junior college. Starting in 1928, the school added additional buildings to the campus. The school began admitting female students in 1930, and received accreditation as a four-year college in 1934. Old Main functioned as the school's administration building until the 1950s. It was renovated in 1920 after a major fire, and again in 1976 and 1995. At one time or another, Old Main housed the science labs, the cafeteria, a pipe organ, and a Fumatorium (smoking room) where students in the early 1900s smoked, talked and played chess. Along with Irion Hall, Old Main even served as the library (in an unofficial capacity) before Memorial Library was built. Old Main now houses faculty offices, art studios and general classrooms and is listed on the National Register of Historic Places.
