= Documentation Research and Training Centre =

Indian research institute

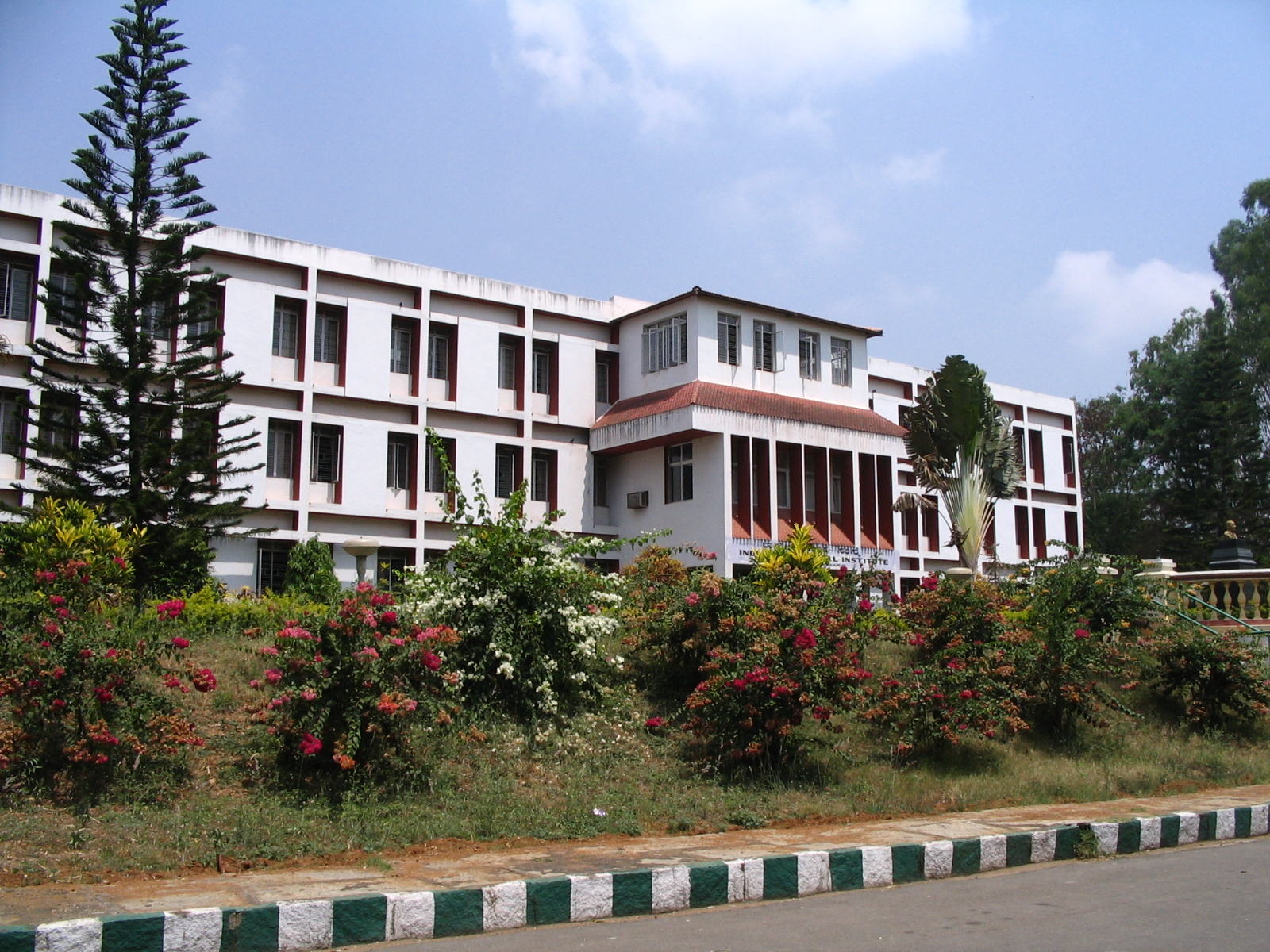
- ISI Bangalore Main Building which houses DRTC
- 12.932595399473893°N 77.50375917627363°E
- Location: Bengaluru, India
- Type: Research Institute
- Established: April 1962
- Branch of: Indian Statistical Institute

Other information
- Website: https://drtc.isibang.ac.in/

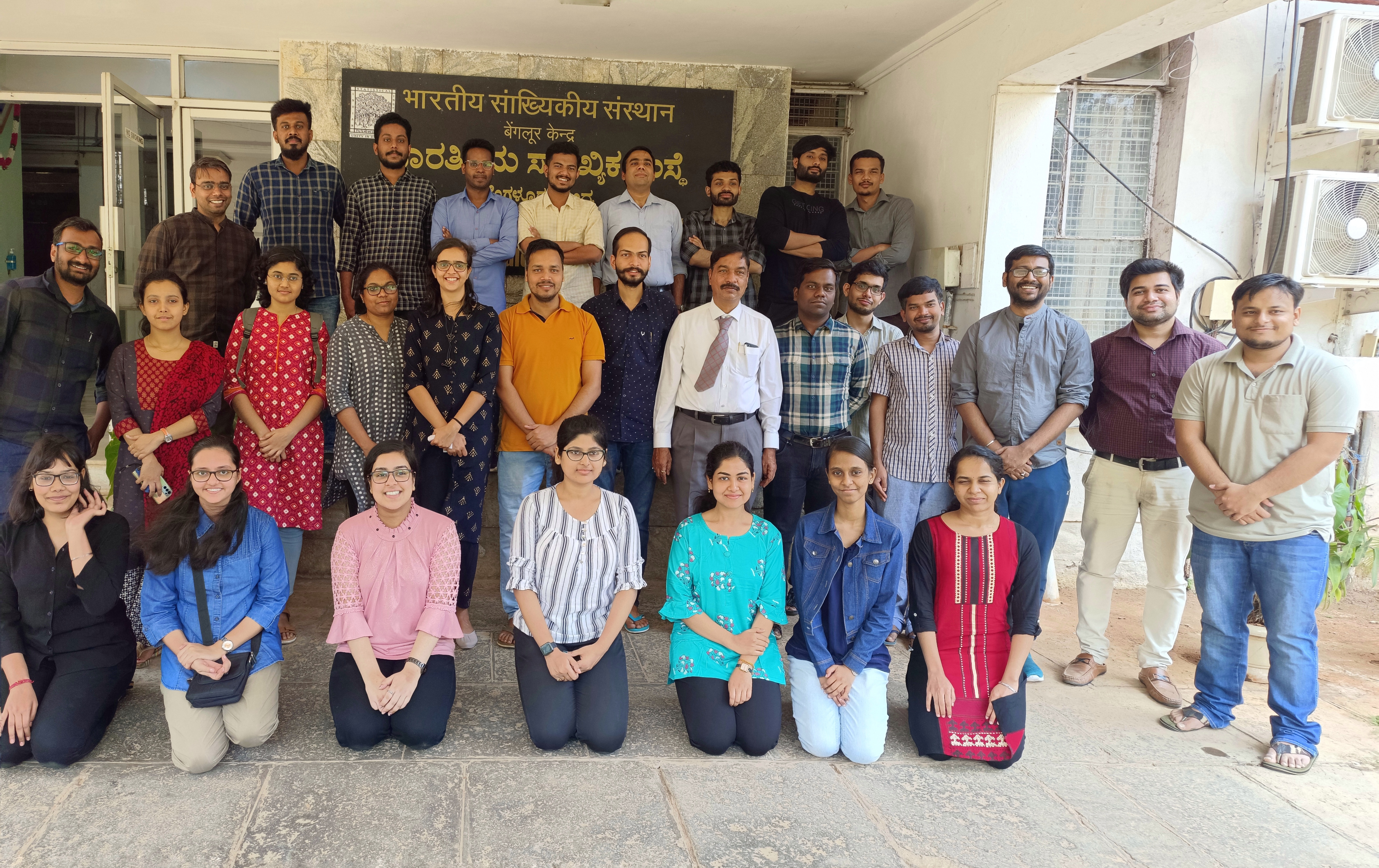
DRTC Head with Students (2022)

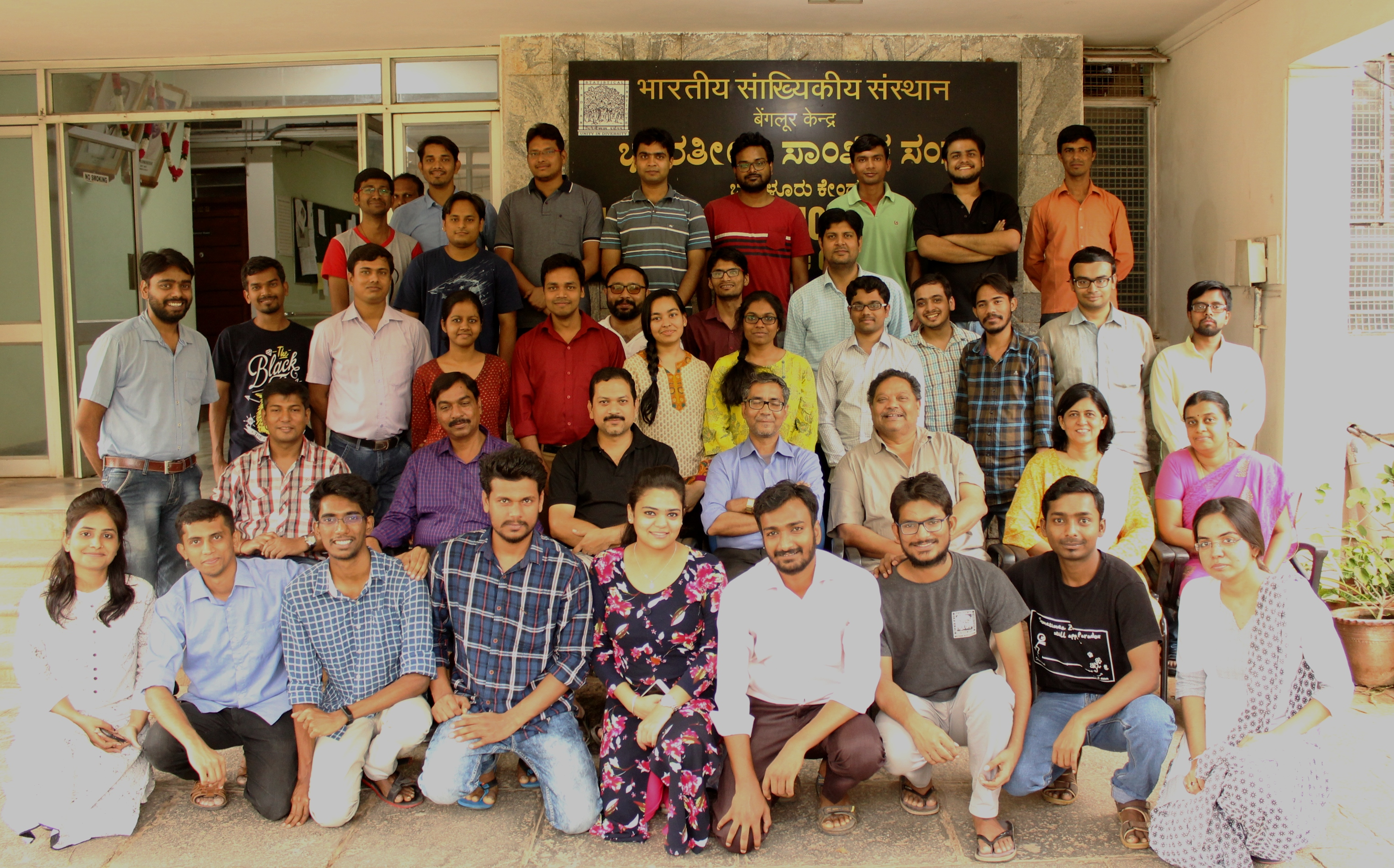
DRTC Faculties and Students (2018)

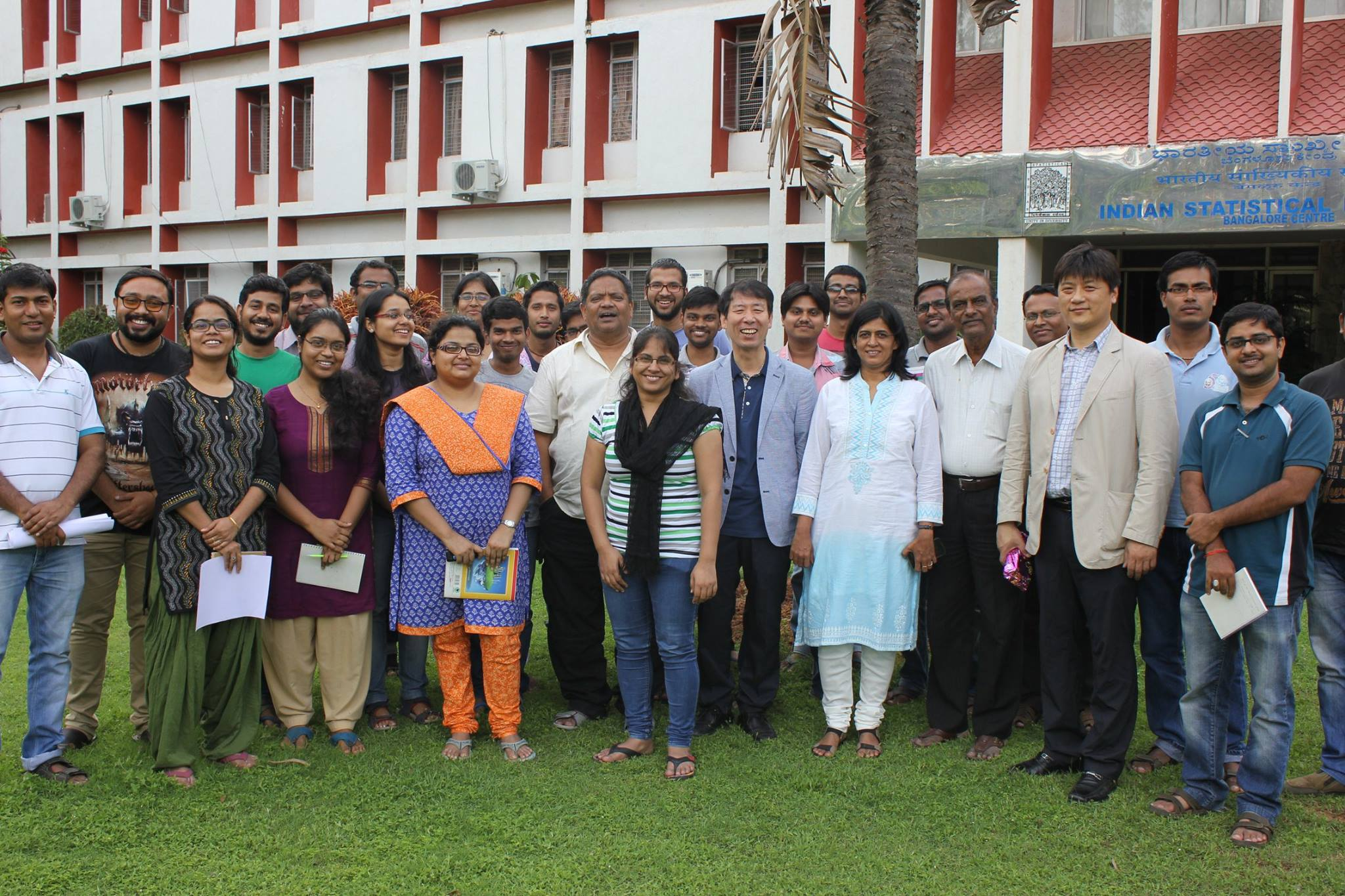
DRTC Faculties and Students (2015)

Documentation Research and Training Centre (DRTC) is a research institute for information science and allied disciplines at the Indian Statistical Institute, Bangalore. The centre was established in April 1962, under the auspices of Prof. S. R. Ranganathan (considered to be the father of modern library and information science in India) with the encouragement of Prof. P. C. Mahalanobis at the Indian Statistical Institute. It is an iSchool in India with a very strong research program. DRTC runs a graduate program leading to the award of a 'Master of Science in Library and Information Science' (MS-LIS) from the Indian Statistical Institute as well as serving as an academic and research center for Research Fellows registered for a PhD in Information Science. Research at DRTC generally focuses on the application of information technology to library and information science. DRTC has a Ph.D. collaboration with the University of Trento, Italy.

2012 marked the Golden Jubilee of DRTC, which was celebrated with the 'International Conference on Trends in Knowledge and Information Dynamics' (ICTK-2012).

== Courses ==
=== Master's Program ===
The DRTC offers a Master of Science in Library & Information Science (MS-LIS).

=== Research Program ===
The DRTC offers a Junior Research Fellowship program in Library & Information Science.

== Faculty ==
- Devika P Madalli, Professor
- M Krishnamurthy, Associate Professor and Head
- Biswanath Dutta, Associate Professor

== See also ==
- Documentation science
- Information science
- iSchool
- List of schools of Library and Information Science in India
