= List of American Library Association accredited library schools =

The American Library Association (ALA) accredits Library Science (or similarly named degrees) across higher education institutions.. These programs lead to careers in librarianship, archival, and school librarianship, among others. The current list of ALA accredited library schools has 64 institutions across 68 degree programs at the graduate level accredited to give an approved masters degree.

== United States ==
=== Alabama ===
- University of Alabama College of Communication and Information Sciences

=== Arizona ===
- University of Arizona School of Information Resources and Library Science (College of Social and Behavioral Sciences)]

=== California ===
- San Jose State University: School of Information
- University of California, Los Angeles (UCLA): Department of Information Studies (UCLA Graduate School of Education & Information Studies)
- University of Southern California (USC)

=== Colorado ===
- University of Denver: Library and Information Science (Morgridge College of Education)

=== District of Columbia ===
- The Catholic University of America: School of Library and Information Science

=== Florida ===
- Florida State University: Florida's iSchool: School of Library and Information Studies
- University of South Florida: School of Information

=== Georgia ===
- Valdosta State University: Library and Information Science

=== Hawaii ===
- University of Hawaiʻi at Mānoa: Library and Information Science Program

=== Illinois ===
- Chicago State University: Library and Information Science
- Dominican University: Library and Information Science
- University of Illinois at Urbana–Champaign: The iSchool at Illinois: Graduate School of Library and Information Science

=== Indiana ===
- Indiana University - Bloomington: Department of Information & Library Science
- Indiana University Purdue University Indianapolis: Department of Library & Information Science

=== Iowa ===
- University of Iowa: School of Library and Information Science

=== Kansas ===
- Emporia State University: School of Library and Information Management

=== Kentucky ===
- University of Kentucky: Library and Information Science

=== Louisiana ===
- Louisiana State University: School of Information Studies

=== Maryland ===
- University of Maryland, College Park: Maryland's iSchool: College of Information Studies

=== Massachusetts ===
- Simmons School of Library and Information Science

=== Michigan ===
- University of Michigan: School of Information
- Wayne State University: School of Library and Information Science

=== Minnesota ===
- St. Catherine University: Master of Library and Information Science

=== Mississippi ===
- University of Southern Mississippi: School of Library and Information Science

=== Missouri ===
- University of Missouri: Library and Information Science

=== New Jersey ===
- Rutgers University: School of Communication and Information School of Communication and Information (Online)

=== New York ===
- Long Island University: Palmer School of Library and Information Science
- Pratt Institute: School of Information and Library Science
- CUNY (Queens College): Graduate School of Library and Information Studies
- St. John's University: Library and Information Science
- State University of New York (SUNY) at Albany): College of Computing and Information (Information Studies Department)
- SUNY at Buffalo: Department of Library and Information Studies (Graduate School of Education)
- Syracuse University: School of Information Studies

=== North Carolina ===
- East Carolina University: Library Science
- North Carolina Central University: School of Library and Information Sciences
- University of North Carolina at Chapel Hill: UNC School of Information and Library Science
- University of North Carolina at Greensboro: Library and Information Studies (School of Education)

=== Ohio ===
- Kent State University: School of Library and Information Science

=== Oklahoma ===
- University of Oklahoma: School of Library and Information Studies

=== Pennsylvania ===
- Drexel University: College of Computing and Informatics
- PennWest Clarion: Department of Library Science
- University of Pittsburgh School of Information Sciences: Library and Information Science

=== Rhode Island ===
- University of Rhode Island: Graduate School of Library and Information Studies

=== South Carolina ===
- University of South Carolina: School of Library and Information Science

=== Tennessee ===
- University of Tennessee: School of Information Sciences (College of Communication and Information)

=== Texas ===
- Texas Woman's University: School of Library and Information Studies
- University of North Texas: Department of Library and Information Sciences (College of Information)
- University of Texas at Austin: School of Information

=== Washington ===
- University of Washington: Information School

=== Wisconsin ===
- University of Wisconsin–Madison: School of Library and Information Studies
- University of Wisconsin–Milwaukee: School of Information Studies

== Puerto Rico ==
- University of Puerto Rico, (Recinto de Río Piedras): Facultad de Comunicación e Información (taught in Spanish)

== Canada ==
=== Alberta ===
- University of Alberta: School of Library and Information Studies (Faculty of Education)

=== British Columbia ===
- University of British Columbia: iSchool @ UBC (School of Library, Archival, and Information Studies)

=== Nova Scotia ===
- Dalhousie University: School of Information Management

=== Ontario ===
- University of Toronto: Faculty of Information (iSchool)
- University of Western Ontario: Faculty of Information and Media Studies
- University of Ottawa: School of Information Studies Master of Information Studies

=== Quebec ===
- McGill University: School of Information Studies (mostly taught in English)
- Université de Montréal: École de bibliothéconomie et des sciences de l'information (taught in French)

== England ==
University College London MA Library and Information Studies.

== Conditionally accredited library schools ==
- East Carolina University: Library Science
- University of California, Los Angeles (UCLA): Department of Information Studies (UCLA Graduate School of Education & Information Studies)
- St. Catherine University: Master of Library and Information Science
