= Florida State University School of Information =

School of Information
- Type: Public
- Established: 1947
- Parent institution: Florida State University College of Communication and Information
- Dean: Michelle Kazmer
- Director: Chris Hinnant
- Location: Tallahassee, Florida, U.S. 30°26′28.3″N 84°17′45.5″W
- Website: ischool.cci.fsu.edu

The Florida State University School of Information is a school within the Florida State University College of Communication and Information.

It was founded in 1947, when Florida State University was founded, as the School of Library Training and Service (SOLTAS). It changed its name in 1968 to the School of Library Science. Another name change occurred in 1981 when the faculty voted to change the name to the School of Library and Information Science in preparation for the opening of the School's new building (the current facility) later in 1981. In 2004, the School changed its name to the College of Information.

The school offers programs in Information Science and Information Technology. These programs are consistently top-ranked programs in the nation and have held such rankings for many years in the U.S. News & World Report. The college is currently ranked 13th overall nationally, the Services for Children and Youth specialization program ranked fifth, School Library Media program ranked first, and the Information Technology program ranked 9th.

The College of Communication & Information offers an Information Technology program at the undergraduate level, an ALA accredited online Master of Science in Information (MSI), a Masters in Information Technology degree (MSIT), a specialist degree, and a doctoral degree. The undergraduate courses are delivered as face to face instruction. At the graduate level, the courses are offered either in a face to face format or online. All graduate courses are offered online at some time to enable students from around the world to participate in the program.

== National rankings ==
U.S. News & World Report #55 overall (2022)

- Masters in Information - 13th overall
- Masters in Information Technology - 9th Overall among all universities; 5th Overall among public universities
- Digital Librarianship - 11th overall
- School Library Media - 1st overall
- Services for Children and Youth - 5th overall

In 2014, the library media program was ranked 1st in the nation by U.S. News & World Report.
