= Palmer School of Library and Information Science =

The Palmer School of Library and Information Science is part of Long Island University in New York, United States and offers a Master of Science degree in Library and Information Science. According to its Graduate Bulletin, the school was founded as the Carlton and Winthrop Palmer Library School, on the then C.W. Post College of Long Island University in 1959. Its MSLIS degree was first accredited in 1971 by the American Library Association. In 1992, Palmer's master's degrees in Library and in Information Science were merged into one degree. Courses were first offered in Manhattan in 1995 and its doctoral program accepted its first students in 1997. The Palmer School is the only full member of the iSchools consortium in the metropolitan New York City area and has the largest enrollment of masters students in library and information science in the state of New York.

The School offers its programs at LIU Post in Brookville, New York and at New York University's Bobst Library in Manhattan. Students can also take master's level courses in Brentwood, New York and in Westchester County, New York. The School partners with NYU to provide a dual degree program, leading to a master's degree from NYU Steinhardt or NYU College of Arts and Science and a Master of Science in Library and Information Science from LIU.

Palmer's program in Library and Information Science is accredited through the American Library Association. Palmer's master's program requires students to complete 36 credits, 30 of which must be in library and information science. There are 18 credits of required courses, including an internship.

The Masters program offers specialization in School Library Media, Public Librarianship, Rare Books and Special Collections, and Academic and Special Librarianship. There are Certificate Programs available in Public Library Administration as well as in Archives and Records Management. The Public Library Administration Certificate is a post-graduate program only, while the Certificate in Archives and Records Management can be pursued concurrently with the MSLIS degree.

Besides offering online and blended courses to meet the needs of its student population, the Palmer School is part of a consortium of Library Science schools offering online course, Web-based Information Science Education, WISE. These online courses are taught by faculty from WISE host schools using their own course management systems and based on their academic calendar. These courses offer students the opportunity to take electives outside the LIU community, without having to transfer credits.

The most recent U.S. News & World Report ranked the Palmer School of Library and Information Science number 39 among the 43 ranked graduate programs in the field.
