= Berlin School of Library and Information Science =

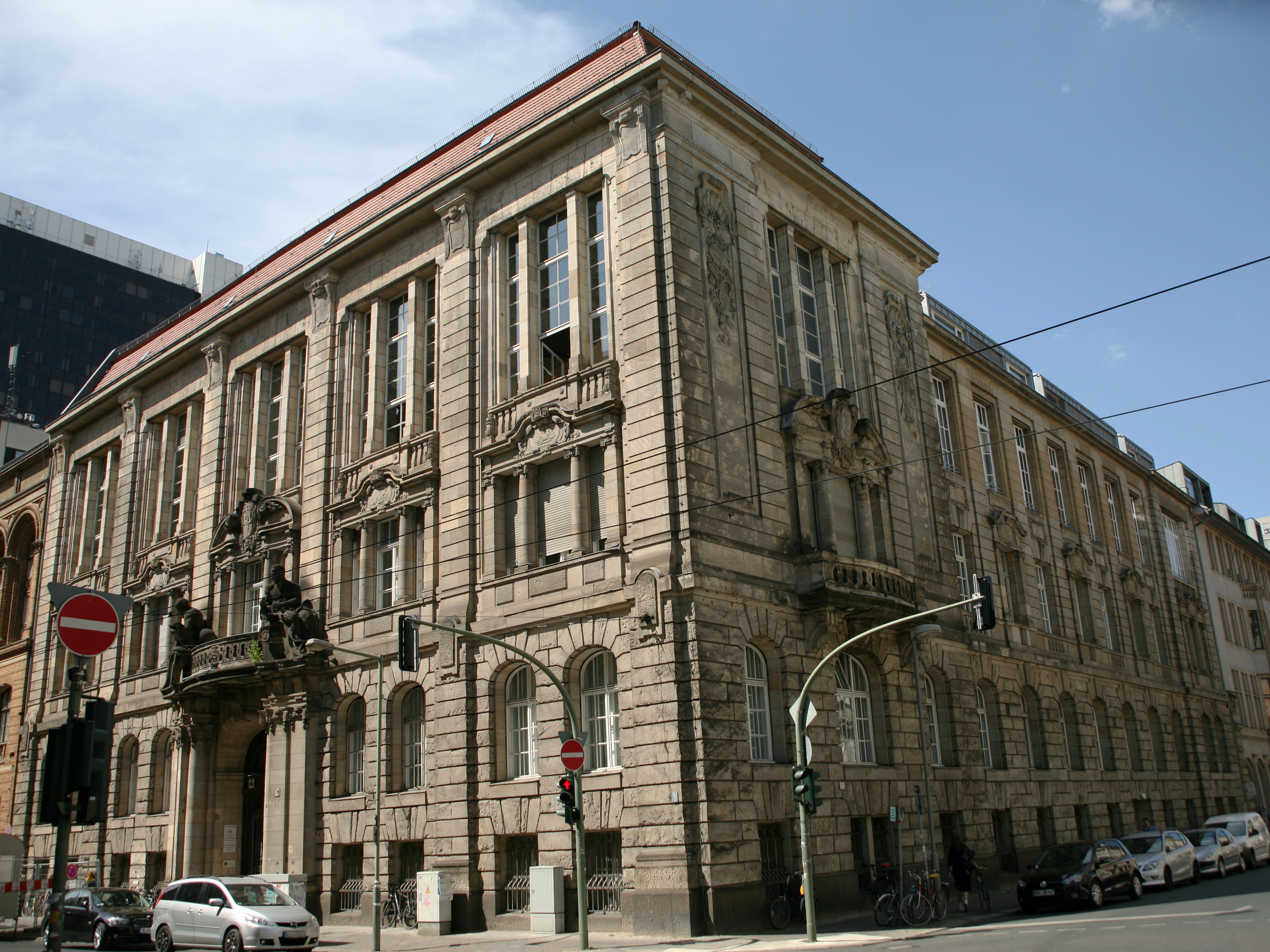
- Type: Public
- Dean: Elke Greifeneder (Director since 2018)
- Academic staff: 3 full professors, 8 Akademische Mitarbeiter, 30 other
- Students: about 500
- Location: Berlin, Germany
- Campus: Urban
- Website: www.ibi.hu-berlin.de

The Berlin School of Library and Information Science at Humboldt Universität zu Berlin (in German, "Institut für Bibliotheks- und Informationswissenschaft") offers study programmes at three levels: bachelors, masters (both a standard program and a postgraduate distant learning program), and doctoral. It is the only institute in Germany with a doctoral programme and the right to award doctorates. Research methods are also an integral part of the pre-doctoral curriculum.

The Berlin School is part of a growing list of i-schools devoted to the study of information as a discipline. It is one of two members in Germany and the only one in the iCaucus group.

== History ==
The Berlin School traces its roots back to the early 20th century. It was closed for a time during the Nazi era. After German reunification in 1990, the two library programs at the Free University of Berlin and at Humboldt-Universität zu Berlin were combined. During the initial years of the 21st century the university had to decide whether to close the school or to transform it. The university decided on transformation and set about gathering the financial resources to make that happen.

In the past the School had offered a quality but fundamentally conventional German library program with a strong emphasis on history and the practical skills necessary to be effective in an entry-level position at a German library. The goal in 2006 became the creation of an internationally competitive "iSchool" on the explicit model of the School of Information at the University of Michigan. It was strengthened with the addition of Peter Schirmbacher and Michael Seadle as new professors at the highest (W3) rank. Schirmbacher brought a wealth of successful digital projects with him and Seadle brought experience with comparable projects plus US connections. Other new faculty included Stefan Gradmann (2008-2013) and Vivien Petras, both of whom led important parts of the Europeana project. Konrad Umlauf completes the spectrum as an expert on public libraries and library management.

Key elements of this transformation included a curriculum with significantly more emphasis on the digital future and the skills necessary to function within that environment. The curriculum put strong emphasis on research and research methods, partly because the Berlin School is the only library and information program at a research-oriented university in Germany, and partly because problem solving in the digital environment inherently involves research. The research emphasis was also intended to distinguish Humboldt's program from those of the “universities of applied sciences” (Fachhochschule).

== Berlin Library Science Colloquium ==
The Berlin Library Science Colloquium ("Berlin Bibliothekswissenschaftliches Kolloquium", BBK). offers during each semester a range of international speakers on current topics of information science, innovative projects and library and information science research. Most presentations (either in English or German) are available as recordings from the BBK-Website .

== Projects ==
Below are only some of the national and international projects in which the Berlin School plays a significant role. For a full list of projects, see: http://www.ibi.hu-berlin.de/forschung/forschungsprojekte

Digitised Manuscripts to Europeana (2012–2015) aims to technically enable as many content providers as possible to integrate their content into Europeana.

re3data.org registry of research data repositories (2012–2014) The goal of re3data.org is to create a global registry of research data repositories from different academic disciplines. re3data.org presents repositories for the permanent storage and access of data sets to researchers, funding bodies, publishers and scholarly institutions. In the course of this mission re3data.org aims to promote a culture of sharing, increased access and better visibility of research data.

LuKII (LOCKSS und KOPAL Infrastruktur und Interoperabilität) (2009–2012) was a project sponsored by the Deutsche Forschungsgemeinschaft. The project proposes interoperability between the open-source elements of two existing archiving systems (LOCKSS and KOPAL) in order to combine cost-effective bitstream preservation with an established tool for usability maintenance and format migration. The German National Library was a partner on LuKII.

IUWIS (Infrastruktur Urheberrecht für Wissenschaft und Bildung) (2009-2011) is also project sponsored by the Deutsche Forschungsgemeinschaft. It offers information and discussion opportunities about copyright for research and education, and aims both as the producers of copyright-protected information as well as users. The University of Constance was a partner on IUWIS.

== Building and location ==
The School's home is a 1903-1904 building by architects Wilhelm Cremer und Richard Wolffenstein and can be found Dorotheenstraße 26, at the corner of Universitätsstraße, directly across from the historic Main Building or Hauptgebäude of the Humboldt University of Berlin.

Between 1905 and 1945, the building housed the Berlin Chamber of Commerce. After that, the building was used by the Museum for German History, which opened in 1952 at Clara-Zetkin-Straße 26 (now Dorotheenstraße). Later, the building housed part of the offices of the GDR Academy of Sciences. Finally, it became home to the School of Library Science.

The building is listed as a historical monument. Its elaborate decoration, including two sandstone sculptures by Ernst Westphal in the main portal, emphasises its neo-Baroque character.
