= University of Pittsburgh School of Computing and Information =

School of University of Pittsburgh

Coordinates: 40.447332°N 79.952712°W

- Established: 2017 (from a merger of programs established in 1901 and 1966)
- Dean: Bruce Childers (2020)
- Faculty: 68
- Administrative staff: 49
- Students: 1,733
- Location: Pittsburgh, Pennsylvania, US
- Campus: Urban
- Website: www.sci.pitt.edu

The University of Pittsburgh's School of Computing and Information is one of the 17 schools and colleges of University of Pittsburgh located on the university's main campus in the Oakland section of Pittsburgh, Pennsylvania, United States. The school was formed in 2017 with a focus on academic programs that teach contextually situated computing in an interdisciplinary manner. The school offers bachelor's, master's, and doctoral degrees as well as certificate programs and houses three departments: Computer Science, Informatics and Networked Systems, and Information Culture and Data Stewardship.

The school was created by combining the university's School of Information Sciences, which was also known as the "iSchool" and was founded in 1901, with the Department of Computer Science, which was founded in 1966 and previously housed the university's Dietrich School of Arts and Sciences. Located on the University of Pittsburgh's main campus in the Oakland section of Pittsburgh, the school was led by its founding Dean Paul Cohen until he stepped down in July 2020 to be temporarily replaced by Interim Dean Bruce Childers. Childers was named the new dean of the school in April 2022.

Founded in 1901, the former School of Information Sciences was one of the nation's pioneering schools in the education of information professionals. Originating as the Training School for Children's Librarians at the Carnegie Library, the school moved to the Carnegie Institute of Technology in 1930, and eventually to the University of Pittsburgh in 1961. In its last year as a separate school, it is ranked 10th in the list of Best Library and Information Studies Programs by U.S. News & World Report and is one of the original members in the list of I-Schools. The Department of Computer Science was founded in 1966 making it one of the oldest such departments in the country.

== Academic programs ==
The School of Computing and Information offers bachelor's, master's, and doctoral degree programs that are provided by three departments: Computer Science, Informatics and Networked Systems, and Information Culture and Data Stewardship. Various certificate of advanced study programs are also offered.

=== Undergraduate programs ===
The Bachelor of Science programs are offered for:

- Computer Science
- Information Science
- Computational Biology
- Digital Narrative and Interactive Design
- Data Science
- Computational Social Science
- Physics and Quantum Computing

A combined bachelor and master of science program is also offered for students to complete both degrees in five years.

=== Master's degree programs ===
The Master of Science programs are offered in the following:

- Computer Science (MS)
- Data Science (MDS)
- Information Science (MSIS)
- Intelligent Systems (MS)
- Library and Information Science (MLIS)
- Telecommunications (MST)

The Master of Library and Information Science program of the school is ranked 17th overall by U.S. News & World Report in the magazine's 2021 rankings of "Best Library and Information Studies Programs."

=== PhD programs ===
The Doctor of Philosophy degree provides research-oriented graduate study and professional specialization in the computing and information sciences. The program prepares students for advanced work in teaching and in conducting significant research.

PhD programs are offered in the following fields:

- Computer Science
- Computational Modeling and Simulation
- Information Science
- Information Science with a concentration in Telecommunications
- Intelligent Systems
- Library and Information Science

=== Certificate programs ===
Several Certificates of Advanced Study are provided for study beyond bachelor's and master's degrees in the following fields:

- Applied Data Driven Methods
- Big Data Analytics
- Cybersecurity, Policy, and Law
- Information and Network Security
- Information Science
- Telecommunications

== Faculty ==
The School of Computing and Information is home to over 60 faculty members whose expertise ranges from wireless security and Web semantics to cyber-scholarship and record-keeping systems. The school also had 26 adjunct faculty with joint appointments from fields as diverse as pathology, medicine and business.

== Research ==
The school is recognized for its research. Located in its building are labs for Geoinformatics, Telecommunications, ULab and Personalized Adaptive Web Systems, along with LERSAIS—the Laboratory of Education and Research on Security Assured Information Systems. There are also several active research groups working on various projects such as IR@Pitt, Spatial Information Research Group, and Group for Research on Idealized Neural Systems.

In 2010, the former School of Information Sciences faculty had its work featured in nearly 120 publications.

In fiscal year 2024, the school spent US$7.4 million on research expenditures.

== iSchool caucus ==
The school is a member of the iSchools organization. This organization was founded in 2005 by a collective of Information Schools dedicated to advancing the information field in the 21st century. The iSchool consortium is closely governed by iCaucus. The iSchool at Pitt has not yet hosted an iConference.

== Information Sciences Building ==
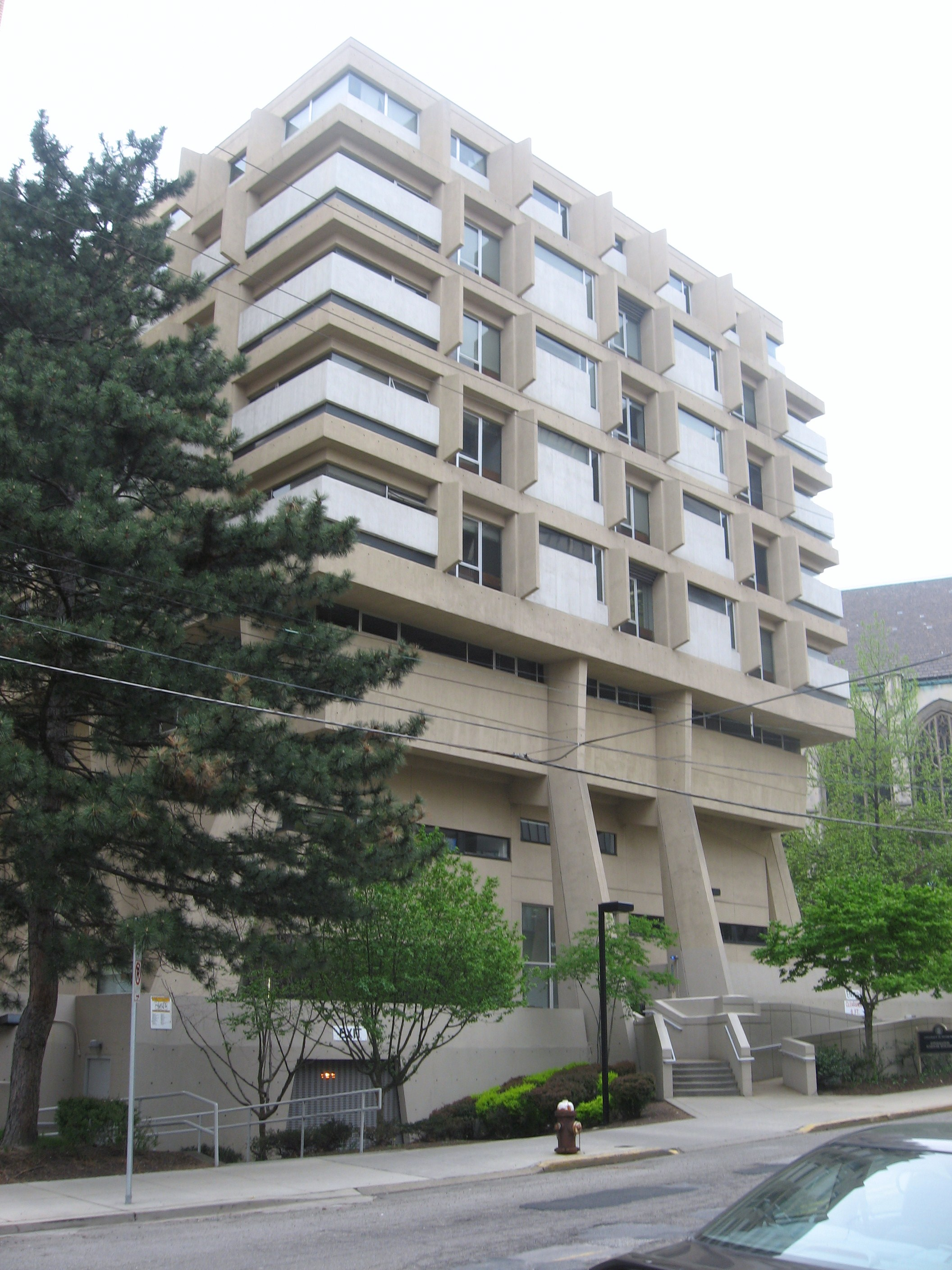
Information Sciences Building

Components of the new School of Computing and Information are housed on the university's main campus in the Information Sciences Building, previously the primary home of the former School of Information Science. Originally the American Institutes for Research Building, the university purchased the 1965 Tasso Katselas designed Brutalist style structure in 1968 and it has since then served as the primary facility housing the School of Information Sciences. In 1975, a renovation was completed that enclosed the building's lower levels to create additional classrooms and offices. An additional renovation to the building was completed in 2013, adding various upgrades including a computer lab, teleconference room, and a third floor Student Collaboration Center for study and work space. Components of the school's Department of Computer Science are housed in Sennott Square. The building is home to the Nesbitt Room which houses several special collections on the history of children and children's books and media, rare editions of children's books, and some unique furnishings and artifacts.

== See also ==
- University of Pittsburgh Library System Archives Service Center
- List of American Library Association accredited library schools
- List of information schools

Preceded by Frick Fine Arts Building	University of Pittsburgh buildings Information Sciences Building; Constructed: 1965	Succeeded by Hillman Library
