= Rutgers School of Communication and Information =

Coordinates: 40.50503°N 74.45395°W

- Type: Public
- Established: 1982
- Dean: William Klein
- Location: New Brunswick, New Jersey, United States
- Website: sci.rutgers.edu

Rutgers School of Communication and Information (SC&I) is a professional school of Rutgers University–New Brunswick. The school was created in 1982 from a merger of the Graduate School of Library and Information Studies, the School of Communication Studies, and the Livingston Department of Urban Journalism. It includes departments of Communication, Journalism and Media Studies, and Library and Information Science. Undergraduate majors include Communication, Journalism and Media Studies, Information Technology and Informatics, and Data Science. Graduate programs include the Master of Communication and Media, Master of Information, and Ph.D. in Communication, Information, and Media. The school has approximately 2,500 undergraduate, master's, and doctoral students, while more than 9,500 Rutgers students take one or more SC&I courses annually.

In the U.S. News & World Report 2025 rankings, its graduate program in library and information studies was ranked joint sixth. Since July 1, 2026, the dean of the School of Communication and Information has been William Klein.

== Academic departments ==
=== Communication ===
The Department of Communication studies the nature and effects of communication on individuals, social groups, and society, including the ways in which communication is practiced in everyday life and the choices about communication that affect individuals and their situation. This program was founded as an undergraduate program in 1971.

Department faculty research includes health communication, organizational leadership, computational social science, family communication, social networks, and conversation analysis.

=== Journalism and Media Studies ===
The Department of Journalism and Media Studies examines the relationships among media texts, institutions, and audiences, especially in the way that media and society affect each other politically, culturally, and socially. This includes study of both the “traditional” mass media and newer electronic technologies and telecommunications. The Journalism and Media Studies program was founded in 1926.

Faculty research explores media content and effects; audience reception and interpretive processes; the emergence of audiences understood in terms of race, age, gender, class, and politics; the sociology and production of culture; communication law, regulation, and policy; and the media’s roles in political and international communication and in educational systems.

=== Library and Information Science ===
The Department of Library and Information Science focuses on the role of information in personal, social, institutional, national, and international contexts. Research of information-seeking activity, information retrieval systems, and information structures are core interests. These research interests involve considerations of design, management, and evaluation of information systems and services along with the development and assessment of tools responsive to the information needs of users. Digital libraries, school libraries and youth services, knowledge management, and information personalization are areas of notable emphasis within the department. The program was founded in 1927.
