= University of Arizona School of Information =

The University of Arizona College of Information Science is a multidisciplinary academic department and professional school that is housed within the University's College of Social and Behavioral Sciences. The school focuses on the many aspects of information organization, management, or use and its impact on individuals and society. A combination of the School of Information Resources & Library Science (SIRLS) and the School of Information: Science, Technology, and Arts (SISTA), this new department plays host to faculty and students engaged in research and education on facets of the information sciences.

== Undergraduate programs ==
The School of Information currently offers three undergraduate degrees:

- The Bachelor of Arts in Information Science & Arts program focuses on topics such as digital aesthetics, information representation and computational art culture.
- The Bachelor of Arts in Information Science & e-Society program studies issues related to privacy, ethics, information manipulation and the impact of social media on daily life.
- The Bachelor of Science in Information Science & Technology explores topics such as machine learning, natural language processing and artificial intelligence.

Undergraduate students currently work in or graduate to become professionals in the fields of information management, data analysis, social media marketing, web design, and public relations.

== Graduate & Doctoral Programs ==
- The Master of Arts in Library and Information Science program focuses on information organization, law, and culture, and is the only American Library Association (ALA) accredited degree program in the State of Arizona.
- The new Master of Science in Information program recruits and admits applicants from a variety of different backgrounds, including sciences and engineering, social sciences, arts and humanities. The focus of this interdisciplinary program includes computational social science, data science, machine learning, and information retrieval or text mining.
- The Ph.D. in Information prepares researchers for careers in which they conduct original research in academia, government, and industry.

== Certificate Programs ==
The School of Information offers graduate certificates for professionals with advanced degrees in:

- Digital Information Management (known as "DigIn") (UA Online)
- Archival Studies (UA Online)
- Law Librarianship
- Legal Information & Scholarly Communication
- Medical and Community Health Information (UA Online)

== Student Clubs & Activities ==
Active student library organizations at the School of Information include:

- Library Student Organization (LSO)
- Progressive Librarians Guild (PLG)
- Special Libraries Association Student Chapter (SLA)
- Special Libraries Association Arizona Chapter (SLA)

== See also ==
- List of American Library Association accredited library schools
