= Florida State University College of Communication and Information =

College of Communication and Information
- Type: Public
- Established: 2009
- Parent institution: Florida State University
- Dean: Michelle Kazmer
- Students: 2,466
- Location: Tallahassee, Florida, U.S.
- Website: www.cci.fsu.edu

The Florida State University College of Communication and Information, located in Tallahassee, Florida, was created in a merger of the Florida State University College of Information with FSU's College of Communication on July 1, 2009. The merged College of Communication & Information includes three schools:

- The Florida State University School of Communication, established in 1967, which offers degrees and certificates in areas such as Media Studies/Communication Studies and Media Production;
- The Florida State University School of Communication Science and Disorders, established in the 1970s, which focuses on areas such as speech-language pathology and audiology; and,
- The Florida State University School of Information, established in 1947, which provides degrees and certificates in areas such as Information, Information Technology, and Health Informatics.

Dr. Michelle M. Kazmer is the current dean of the Florida State University College of Communication and Information. Institutes, centers, clinics, and other special units operating within the College of Communication and Information include:

- The Center for Hispanic Marketing Information
- The Center for Information Management and Scientific Communication
- Goldstein Library
- The Information Use, Management and Policy Institute
- L.L. Schendel Speech and Hearing Clinic
- Partnerships Advancing Library Media (PALM) Center
- The Project Management Center
- Seminole Productions

== School of Communication ==
The School of Communication is home to Seminole Productions, a sports production effort.

== National rankings ==
U.S. News & World Report (2015 Edition)

- Library & Information Studies - 13th overall
- Digital Librarianship - 11th overall
- School Library Media - 1st overall
- Services for Children and Youth - 5th overall
- Online Graduate Information Technology - 20th overall

In 2014, the school media program was ranked 1st in the nation by U.S. News & World Report.
