= University of Kentucky College of Communication and Information =

College in Lexington, US

College of Communication and Information
- Type: Public
- Established: May 4, 1976
- Dean: Dr. Jennifer Greer
- Location: Lexington, Kentucky, USA
- Campus: Urban
- Website: http://ci.uky.edu

The College of Communication and Information is the communications, information, and media unit at the University of Kentucky. The college offers the following undergraduate majors: Communication, Information Communication Technology, Integrated Strategic Communication, Journalism, and Media Arts and Studies. Graduate programs are offered in Communication, Information Communication Technology, and Library Science. It is the only American Library Association accredited program in library and information science in the state of Kentucky.

== Departments ==
The College of Communication & Information features five units and an interdisciplinary graduate program.

- Department of Communication
- Department of Integrated Strategic Communication
- Graduate Program in Communication
- School of Information Science (name change in July 2015 from School of Library and Information Science)
- School of Journalism and Media

== History ==
The first journalism courses were offered at the then named "Kentucky University" in 1869 through the English Department. 23 years later the university would issue its edition of The Cadet, a student run newspaper. In 1908 President James K. Patterson recommended the establishment of a separate Department of Journalism to support the growth of interest in journalism at the college. Three years later, in 1911, the school began offering Library Science Education starting with its first course in "Library Training," offered through the English Department. The following year, Margaret I. King, secretary to President Patterson and namesake of the Margaret I. King Library, was appointed as the university's first librarian for the 7,367 gross sq. ft., Carnegie Library.

In 1914 the Department of Journalism was finally established and Enoch Grehan was appointed as the department's first director. The following year, the Kentucky Kernel publishes its first issue. In 1917 Margaret I. King began teaching a new library science course titled "Library Methods for Teachers." As the Kentucky Kernel continued its operations, director Grehan took the bold move of risk his savings in order to finance a linotype machine to enable the student newspaper to start its printing operation. By 1931, the Department of Journalism had received its first accreditation and a new Department of Library Science was founded with Mildred Semmons as its head within the following year. The first BS of Library Science became available in 1942 following the Department of Library Science's full accreditation by the American Library Association. In just seven years, the department added a master's degree in Library Science, offering both an undergraduate and graduate degree program.

1950 was a momentous year with the official establishment of the School of Journalism. The University of Kentucky received a gift of $425,000 from the Kentucky Kernel to begin the construction of a new journalism building. By 1966, the MA program in Communication is approved, paving the way for the School of Communications to be established in 1968 with three departments: Journalism, Telecommunications, and Speech. Two years later, the School of Library Science became the College of Library Science, establishing it as the first college of Library Science in the country. On January 19, 1972, the Kentucky Kernel became a completely independent newspaper publication for student reporters, as it continues to remain to this day. Just seven years after its establishment, the School of Communications was abolished and replaced with a School of Journalism and Department of Human Communication.

In the following year of 1976, a new College of Communications had been established on the University of Kentucky's campus. Shortly thereafter the College of Communication received approval for its P.h.D. in Communication, enrolling its first class of doctoral students in 1977. Also in 1977 the college had its first dean—a woman—Dr. Ramona Rush. In 1980, the University of Kentucky Journalism Alumni Association established the Kentucky Journalism Hall of Fame, located inside the School of Journalism and Media in the Blazer Dining Hall Building In 1993, the College of Communications and College of Library and Information Science merged to create the current College of Communication and Information Studies. In 2000, the Kentucky Kernel was awarded a Pacemaker Award, one of only six daily collegiate newspapers in the country to receive the honor. In 2004, the College of Communication and Information Studies founded the Institute for Rural Journalism and Community Issues.
