= Libraries and Information Centres in India =

== Libraries and Information Centres in India ==
- Ahmedabad Library Network (ADINET)
- Bombay Science Librarian's Association (BOSLA)
- Calcutta Library Network (CALIBNET)
- Central Reference Library, Kolkata
- Defence Scientific Information and Documenation Centre (DESIDOC)
- Delhi Library Association
- Delhi Public Library
- Developing Library Network (DELNET)
- Documentation Research and Training Centre (DRTC), Bangalore
- Health Education Library for People
- Indian Association of Special Libraries and Information Centres (IASLIC)
- Indian Library Association (ILA)
- Information and Library Network (INFLIBNET), Ahmedabad
- Kerala Library Association
- Kesavan Institute of Information and Knowledge Management
- Madras Library Association
- Medical Library Association of India (MLAI)
- Mysore Library Network (MYLIBNET), Mysore
- National Centre for Science Information (NCSI), Bangalore
- National Information System for Science and Technology (NISSAT), New Delhi
- National Institute of Science Communication and Information Resources, New Delhi (Formerly INSDOC)
- National Library of India
- National Medical Library
- National Social Science Documentation Centre (NASSDOC), New Delhi
- Pune Library Network
- Raja Rammohun Roy Library Foundation
- SAARC Documentation Centre
- Satinder Kaur Ramdev Memorial Trust for Advancement of Librarianship (SATKAL)
- Small Enterprises National Documentation Centre (SENDOC)
- Society for Advancement of Library and Information Science (SALIS)
- Society for Information Science (SIS)
- Society for Information Research & Studies (SIRs)
- Special Libraries Association, Asian Chapter
- Uttar Pradesh Library Association
- Virtual Information Centre

== See also ==
- List of schools of Library and Information Science in India
- List of library associations in India
- Library science education in India
