= Library networks in India =

A library network is to an interconnected platform of some group of libraries with certain agreements aims to satisfy and fulfill their users' needs. The common objectives of a library network are to acquire and develop unique collection of the each and avoiding the duplication of materials to resolve the budgetary problem. Each library performs sharing of resources to each other on demand basis.

== Overview ==
The concept of library network came into light after 1985 when the working group of the Planning Commission reported a modernize plan on National Policy on Library and Information System to the Ministry of HRD, Govt of India on the seventh five-year plan. The Dept of Science and Industrial Research (DSIR), Govt. of India started to promote the integrated approach to Library Automation and Networking based on the UGC report prepared by the Association of Indian Libraries 1987.

== List ==
Library Networks in India include:

- Ahmedabad Library Network (ADINET) is the library network of Ahmedabad area. It was established in 1994 with an initial grant for a few years from National Information System for Science and Technology (NISSAT). ADINET caters to libraries of school, college, universities, institutional libraries and even public libraries in Ahmedabad.
- Bangalore Academic Library Network (BALNET) was established in 1995 in sponsored by JRD Tata Memorial Library Bangalore. BALNET caters to the libraries of Balgalore area to facilitate the sharing of resources.
- Bombay Library Network (BONET) was set up in 1992 by National Centre for Software Technology (NCST), Mumbai sponsored by NISSAT.
- Calcutta Library Network (CALIBNET) was established in 1986 with the financial help from NISSAT. The main objective of CALIBNET i to provide access of information to the library and information centers in eastern region.
- Chhattisgarh Library Network (CGLN) was established in 2024 with the financial help from Dr. Kundan and support from Chhattisgarh Library Association. The main objective of CGLN to provide access of information to the library and information centers in Chhattisgarh region.
- Developing Library Network (DELNET) was established in 1988 and registered as a society in 1992 from the financial support of NISSAT at the India International Centre Library Delhi. Earlier it was named as Delhi Library Network and developed with the primer objective of sharing of resources to its member libraries.
- Indore Library Network (INDOLIBNET) was established to provision of equal access to universe of knowledge, information and cultures & promote understanding of the cultural diversity of Indore.
- Information and Library Network (INFLIBNET) was established in 1991 with the objective of establishing a communication between the libraries and information centers universities, colleges, UGC information centers, institutes of national importance, R&D information centers etc. as a programme of the University Grants Commission. Initially it was located at the Gujarat University campus, Ahmedabad but later it was shifted to Gandhinagar.
- Madras Library Network (MALIBNET) was established as a society in the 1993 to bring about co-operative working among libraries and information centres in and around Madras. Membership of MALIBNET is open to universities, colleges, R&D institutions, industries and individuals.
- Mysore Library Network (MYLIBNET) was established at Mysore in the year 1994 with the financial assistance from NISSAT at the Central Food Technological Research Institute (CFTRI) Mysore. MYLIBNET is an active member of Mysore City Library Consortium (MCLC).
- Management Libraries Network (MANLIBNET) was established for sharing of resources and information among the management and business libraries and the librarians. MANLIBNET was established in year 1998 at the first convention held in Ahmadabad which was jointly organized by the IIM, Ahmadabad and Ahmadabad Management Association.
- Pune Library Network (PUNENET) is a joint programme of the University of Pune, National Chemical Laboratory (NCL) and Centre for Development of Advanced Computing (C-DAC) funded by NISSAT and was established in 1992.
- West Bengal Public Library Network (WBPLNET) is an initiative of Department of Mass Education Extension & Library Services, Government of West Bengal. State Central Library West Bengal is the apex Library in the network.
- Ministry of Earth Sciences in collaboration with Informatics launched a Library Network portal, named Knowledge Resource Center(MoES KRCNet), for all the Earth Science institutes.

== See also ==
- List of libraries in India
- List of library consortia in India
- List of library associations in India
- Libraries and Information Centres in India
- Education in India
