= List of library associations in India =

This is a list of library associations in India. Library associations connect libraries and library workers at the local and national level. They often provide resources to their individual and institutional members that enable cooperation, exchange of information, education, research, and development.

== National Associations ==
- Indian Association of Special Libraries and Information Centres
- Indian Library Association
- Central Government Library Association (CGLA)
- Indian Association of Teachers of Library and Information Science (IATLIS)
- Raja Rammohun Roy Library Foundation
- Society for Advancement of Library & Information Science

== Local Associations ==
- Andhra Pradesh Library Association
- Assam Library Association
- Bengal Library Association
- Chhattisgarh Library Association
- Delhi Library Association
- Kerala Library Association

== See also ==
- Library networks in India
- List of library associations
- Libraries and Information Centres in India
