= G. Gopakumar =

G. Gopakumar is an Indian leading political scientist and psephologist. He was former vice chancellor of Central University of Kerala,.

== Career ==
- Professor at Kerala University for over fifteen years.
- Dean of Social Sciences and professor and HoD of political science, University of Kerala
- Vice-chairman, academic committee, Credit and Semester System, University of Kerala
- Co-ordinator, UGC Special Assistance Programme, Department of Political Science, University of Kerala.
- Director general of the Institute of Parliamentary Affairs, Government of Kerala
- Director, V.K. Krishna Menon Study Centre for International Relations
- Director, Nehru Study Centre,
- UGC-Emeritus Fellow,
- ICSSR Senior Fellow,

== Fellowships and awards ==
- Visiting research fellow, University of New South Wales, Australia (2010)
- Prince of Songkla University, Thailand (2010)
- Australian Studies Senior Fellow (2009)
- Visiting fellow, Shastri Indo-Canadian Fellowship (2000 & 2006)
- Visiting faculty, Claremont Graduate University, US (2003)
- Fulbright Award, US (1998 & 2002)
- Salzburg Fellow, Austria (1998)
- Visiting Faculty, University of Calgary, Canada (2001)
- International visiting fellow in US (1996)
- UGC-Indo-French Cultural Exchange Award (1990)
- UGC-research scientist (1988–1989)

== International projects ==
- University of Pennsylvania, Center for the Advanced Study of India (CASI), Coalition Politics in India
- Claremont Graduate University (CGU) in California and the University of Kerala (Kerala) Partnership

== Select publications ==
Books

- Civil Society- Politics Interface: The Kerala Experience, Manak Publishers, New Delhi, 2013
- Globalization and the Plight of the Marginalized Sections in Kerala: The Case of Chengara Land Struggle, Department of Political Science, University of Kerala, 2010
- Gulf Return Migration and Dilemmas of Rehabilitation, Icon Publishers, New Delhi, 2008
- Regional Political Parties and State Politics, Deep and Deep Publications, New Delhi, 1986
- The Congress Party and State Politics, Deep and Deep Publications, New Delhi, 1984

Edited Books

- Foreign Policy, Federalism and International Treaties (ed.), New Century Publications, New Delhi, 2011.
- Towards an Inclusive India: Role of Parliament in Social Change (ed.), Manak Publishers, New Delhi, 2011
- Nehru and Modern India: Anatomy of Nation Building (ed.), New Century Publications, New Delhi, 2010
- Future of Parliamentary Democracy in India (ed.), Icon Publishers, New Delhi, 2007
- Iraq War and New World Order (ed.), Icon Publishers, New Delhi, 2005

== Contribution ==
Gopa Kumar specializes in the areas of International Relations, Comparative Politics and Indian Politics. He had published 12 books and over 145 research articles and successfully guided 27 PhD candidates. He is also a popular TV panelist in Kerala and is known for objective and scientific political analysis.

== Media coverage ==
- NAAC accredits B++ grade to Central University of Kerala
- NAAC team completes Central varsity visit
- Future of U.S. linked to the U.S. presidential outcome, Prof (Dr.) G Gopa Kumar
- ‘Better Indo-UAE cultural ties needed’
- Kerala Central varsity in development mode
- Tuber Crops Day 2016, The Central Tuber Crops Research Institute (CTCRI)
- Value Based Education: Dr Gopakumar
- Right Turn Ahead
- Kerala stands apart, again
- Nehru and Nation Building in India, Seminar Presentation
- All you want to know about Fulbright Fellowships
