= Narayanaswamy Balakrishnan =

Indian aerospace and computer scientist

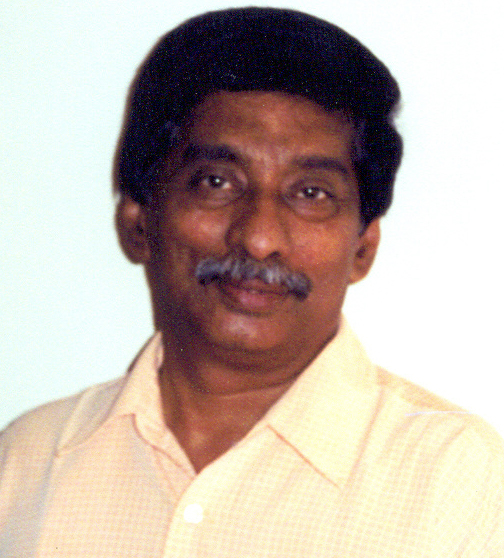
- Born: 1 June 1950 (age 76); Tamil Nadu, India
- Other name: 'Balki'
- Education: Coimbatore Institute of Technology (B.E. Electronics and Communications Engineering ,1972); Indian Institute of Science, Bangalore (PhD, 1979)
- Occupations: Aerospace and computer scientist
- Known for: Super computing
- Awards: Padma Shri, 2002; INAE Prof. S. N. Mitra Memorial Award; DRDO Academy Excellence Award; CIT Outstanding Alumnus Award; Homi J. Bhabha Award; IISc Alumni Award; J. C. Bose Memorial Award; ISCA Millennium Medal; Institute for the Future Award; ASI Excellence Award; Sri Hari Om Prerit Dr. Vikram Sarabhai Research Award; UNESCO/ROSTSCA Young Scientist Award

Narayanaswamy Balakrishnan is an Indian aerospace and computer scientist. He is a Professor of the Department of Aerospace Engineering and Supercomputer Education Research Centre of Indian Institute of Science and a visiting professor of Jawaharlal Nehru Centre for Advanced Scientific Research. Balakrishnan was honored by the Government of India, in 2002, with the fourth highest Indian civilian award of Padma Shri

== Biography ==
Narayanaswamy Balakrishnan, hailing from the South Indian state of Tamil Nadu, was born on 1 July 1950. He graduated (BE Hons) in Electronics and Communication in 1972 from the Coimbatore Institute of Technology, University of Madras and obtained his doctoral degree (PhD) from the Indian Institute of Science (IISc), Bengaluru in 1979. He started his career as an assistant professor at the Department of Aerospace Engineering of IISc and continues his service there as an associate director and professor. He also works as a visiting professor of Jawaharlal Nehru Centre for Advanced Scientific Research and the Institute for Software Research International, Carnegie Mellon University and is a director of the Indian Institute of Information Technology and Management, Industrial Finance Corporation of India, Bharat Sanchar Nigam and the Data Security Council of India. Currently he is heading the National Supercomuting Mission of India approved by Government of India as 7-year project with a budget of 4,500 cr. He held the Satish Dhawan chair professorship of the Division of Information Sciences of IISc from 2003 to 2006 and is a former member of the National Security Advisory Board and the Telecom Regulatory Authority of India. He is a former Deputy Managing Director of El Forge Ltd, and has held the posts of a director at C-DOT Alcatel Lucent Research Centre and Bharat Electronics. He has also served as a director of the Central Bank of India from where he retired in January 2015.

Balakrishnan with some of his former students including Saraju Mohanty and Madhavi Ganapathiraju at the Chicago Alumni Meet in 2013 Hosted by the IISc Alumni Association of North America (IISc AANA).

Balakrishnan is known to have contributed to the establishment of the National Centre for Science Information and Supercomputer Education Research Centre, in 1984 and 1994 respectively, at the Indian Institute of Science. He is involved with the Million Books to the Web Project (MBP), an initiative of the Digital Library of India. On the scientific front, his contributions are reported in the areas of monopulse array antennas and polarimetric Radars. His scientific achievements and observations have been recorded in over 230 articles published in many peer reviewed national and international journals, Google Scholar, an online repository of scientific articles, listing 216 of them.

He was on the Engineering and Computer Science jury for the Infosys Prize from 2016 to 2018.

== Awards and recognitions ==
Balakrishnan received the UNESCO/ROSTSCA Young Scientist Award in 1985 followed by the J. C. Bose Memorial Award of the Institution of Electronics and Telecommunication Engineers (IETE) in 1987. Sri Hari Om Prerit Dr. Vikram Sarabhai Research Award reached him in 1995 and two years later, he received the Platinum Jubilee lecture Award from the Indian Science Congress. He received two awards in 1998, the Institute for the Future Award and the Aeronautical Society of India Aerospace Education Excellence Award. The Indian National Science Congress awarded him the Millennium Medal in 2000 and he received the J. C. Bose Memorial Award for a second time in 2001 followed by the Alumni Award for Excellence from the Indian Institute of Science.

The Government of India honoured him with the civilian award of Padma Shri in 2002. The Hari Om Ashram Trust awarded him the Homi J. Bhabha Award in 2004 and Coimbatore Institute of Technology awarded him the Outstanding Alumnus Medal in 2006. He received the Academy Excellence Award from the Defence Research and Development Organization in 2009 and Prof. S. N. Mitra Memorial Award from the Indian National Academy of Engineering in 2013.

Balakrishnan, a 2007 J. C. Bose National Fellow of the Department of Science and Technology, is an elected Fellow of Third World Academy of Sciences, Indian National Science Academy, Indian Academy of Sciences, Indian National Academy of Engineering, National Academy of Sciences, India and Institution of Electronic and Telecommunication Engineers. He is a recipient of the doctoral degree of PhD (Honoris Causa) from Punjab Technical University and has delivered the CDAC-ACS Foundation Award Lecture, Dr. Neelakantan Memorial Award Lecture and Jawaharlal Nehru Centenary Lecture of the Indian National Science Academy.

== See also ==
- Indian Institute of Science
- Jawaharlal Nehru Centre for Advanced Scientific Research
- National Centre for Science Information
