= Indian Institute of Management Ranchi =

Public business school in Ranchi, Jharkhand, India

- College Logo
- Other name: IIM RANCHI
- Motto: Bahumukhvikaso gantavya
- Motto in English: Working to bring change towards success, not only for one's self, but also for the community.
- Type: Public business school
- Established: 15 December 2009; 16 years ago
- Accreditation: Institute of National Importance
- Affiliations: Ministry of Education (India)
- Chairman: Pravin Shankar Pandya
- Director: Dr. Deepak Kumar Srivastava
- Faculty: 80+
- Administrative staff: 120
- Students: 1200+
- Postgraduates: 750+
- Doctoral students: 100+
- Location: Ranchi, Jharkhand, India; 23°23′0.19″N 85°18′57.31″E
- Campus: Urban
- Website: iimranchi.ac.in

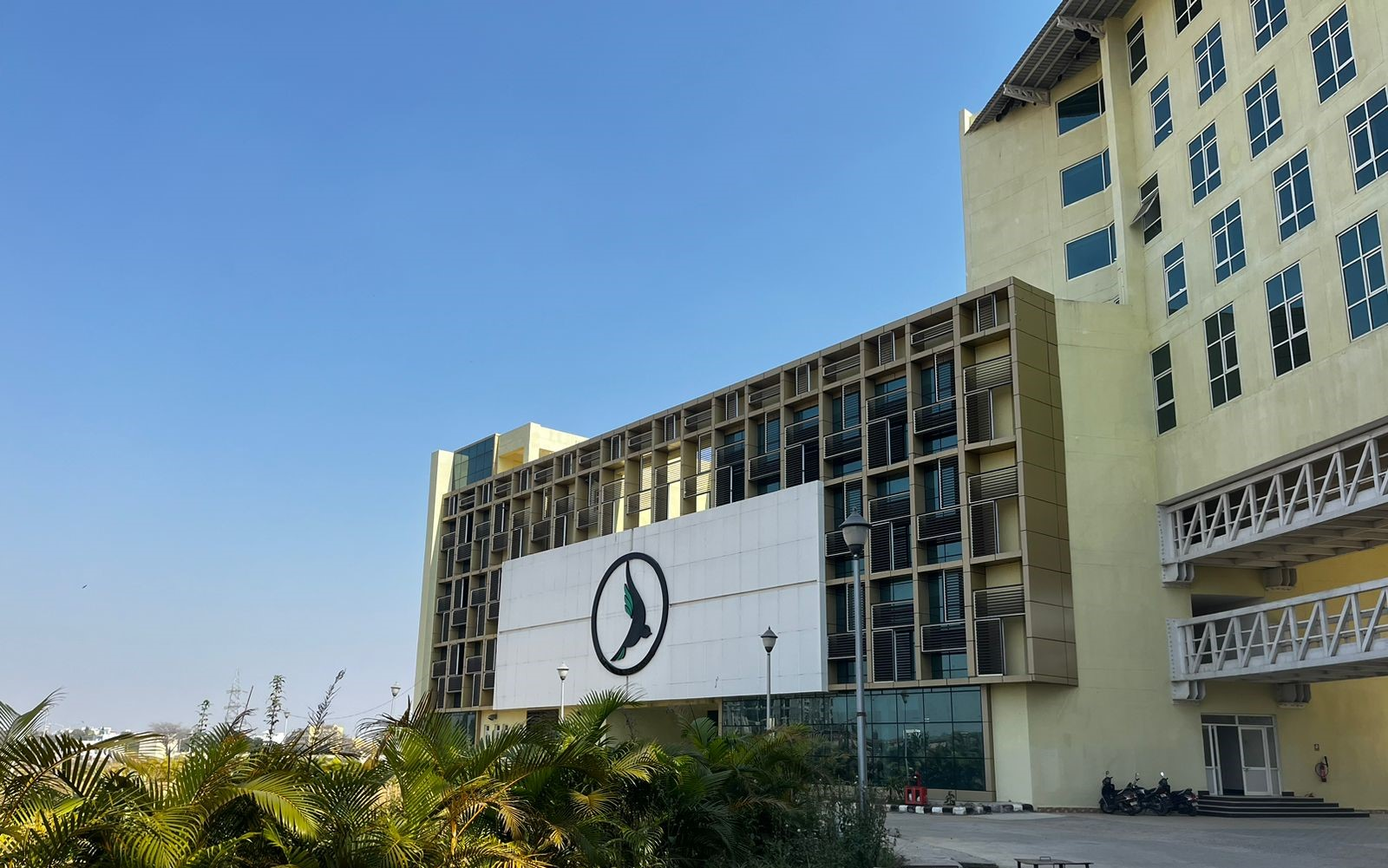
Academic Building of IIM Ranchi (Permanent Campus)

The Indian Institute of Management Ranchi (IIM Ranchi) is a public business school located in Ranchi, Jharkhand, India. Established on 15 December 2009, it became India's ninth Indian Institute of Management. It commenced classes on 6 July 2010, marking the inception of the institute under the 11th Five Year Plan.

IIM Ranchi offers integrated, postgraduate, doctoral, and executive programmes in management education, and Management Development Programmes (MDPs) spanning different streams of management. Admissions to the institute are based on scores obtained in the Common Admission Test (CAT) and further rounds of personal interview and written tests.

== History ==
The 11th Five-Year Plan, endorsed by the National Development Council in December 2007, envisaged the establishment of six new IIMs.

IIM Ranchi is an autonomous institution under the Ministry of Human Resources Development. The institute is free to design its own curriculum and recruit faculty members. In April 2011, Union Minister Kapil Sibal announced that the government allowed them to select the director and the chairman of the board of directors. IIM Ranchi is among the six new IIMs that were approved by the Union Cabinet on 27 August 2009. M. J. Xavier was the founding director of the institute.

The construction of a permanent campus has begun at Birhar village on the Khunti–Karra road, about 35 kilometres (22 mi) from Ranchi. In July 2013, the Jharkhand government allotted 90.14 acres (36.48 ha) of land free of charge to IIM Ranchi at Cheri in Kanke block, 20 km from Ranchi. On 29 July 2013, Union Minister of Human Resource Development Shri Pallam Raju laid the foundation stone of IIM-Ranchi at Cheri.

== Campus ==
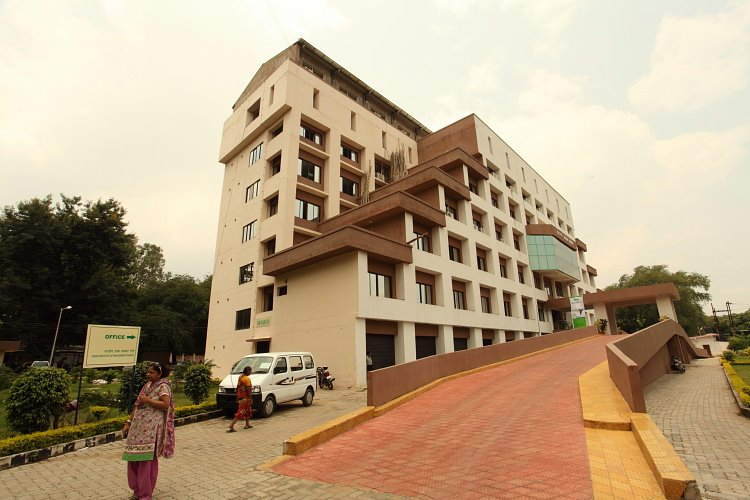
IIM Ranchi academic building on the permanent campus

Since its establishment in 2009, IIM Ranchi has operated from a temporary campus in Suchana Bhavan, behind the Governor House premises in the center of Ranchi, with student hostels at Khelgaon. In 2021, the institute shifted to its permanent campus on a 60-acre plot in Pundag and Nayasarai, Ranchi.

== Academics ==
=== Academic programmes ===
IIM Ranchi offers a master's degree in management as per the approval of the Indian Institute of Management Bill, 2017. Students are awarded degrees in two-year full-time residential programs, MBA, MBA-HRM, MBA-BA and Executive MBA for working professionals in blended mode. IIM Ranchi also offers Doctor of Business Administration (DBA) fellowship programmes and a part-time executive program (PGEXP). IIM-R is among the five IIMs to offer the five-year Integrated Programme in Management (IPM). The Integrated Programme in Management of IIM Ranchi is a full-time 5-year integrated postgraduate programme. The students are awarded a Master of Business Administration (MBA) degree at the end of the 5-year programme.

IIM Ranchi was the first Indian Institute of Management to introduce the Young Changemakers Programme (YCP) in May 2023, which focused on empowering high school students and promoting the development of local villages under the Unnat Bharat Abhiyan. YCP started with the mandatory Social Impact Project undertaken by undergraduate students of IIM Ranchi's Integrated Programme in Management during their second year of study before eventually being formalized as a priority under the institute's IIM Ranchi@2030 Strategic Vision. The programme received more than 500 applications from India, out of which a cohort of 95 youngsters participated in the 3-day event on the IIM Ranchi campus.

The Young Changemakers Programme was expanded to invite international applicants in its second edition in December 2023. In the Global Edition, the number of applications went to over 3000. Participants were selected through shortlisting stages involving application reviews and quizzes. 300 candidates advanced to the interview stage, and 80 received the final offer letter. The organizers instituted new features to YCP 2.0, including travel and other costs for students from the Pestalozzi Children's Village Society, Dehradun.

=== Rankings ===
Institute rankings

Business/Management – India
- NIRF (2024): 17

IIM Ranchi was ranked 18 by the National Institutional Ranking Framework (NIRF) management ranking in 2025. The institute made a decent recovery from its 2023 rank. It had fallen from 15th rank in 2022 to 24th in 2023, due to a variety of factors, such as the shift to its permanent campus and the subsequent loss of world-class sports facility available at Khelgaon.

IIM Ranchi has been ranked seventh in the Top India's Best B-Schools 2024 by Outlook India. The institutions were scored 447.76 points out of 500 points in the evaluation.

=== Admissions ===
Admission to postgraduate courses at IIM Ranchi is based on the Common Admission Test (CAT) that is conducted by the IIMs.

Admission to Integrated Program (BBA-MBA) in Management (IPM) is based on the scores of IPM Admission Test (IPMAT) conducted by IIM Indore every year.

== Student life ==
As of 2019, the total student body consisted of fewer than 1000 students in the MBA, doctoral and executive programs.

=== Student bodies ===
IIM Ranchi is a faculty-driven, student-executed business school. The school has a total of 7 committees, 9 clubs, and 8 Special Interest Groups (SIGs).

IIM Ranchi also has seven independent bodies that function autonomously in tandem with the Student Council. Its Placement Committee is responsible for maintaining corporate relations and conducting the summer and final placement process.

=== Conclaves and conferences ===
- AGON - The Annual Management Fest – an event in the form of case studies, quizzes and essays in finance and communications.
- AAROHAN Leadership Speak Series – its first leadership speak series, "Aarohan", on 8 January 2016 at Cockerel Stadium, Dipatoli cantonment, Ranchi.
- Colloquium – an annual series of guest lectures where students of IIM Ranchi can interact with industry leaders.
- HR Conclave – IIM Ranchi has organized two HR conclaves themed "Turning the tide on unrest in workforce" in 2012 and "Holistic Development of Human Capital" in 2011.
- RADIX – an event based on the themes "Connect," "Enthuse" and "Foster".
- RUSH – a three-day festival.

== See also ==
- List of universities in India
- Indian Institutes of Management
- Higher education in India
- Indian Institute of Management Ahmedabad
- Ministry of Education (India)

== Other information ==
- IIM Ranchi official website
