= NCSI =

NCSI may refer to:

- National Centre for Science Information (NCSI), the information centre of Indian Institute of Science in Bangalore, India
- NCSI (Network Connectivity Status Indicator), an internet connection awareness protocol used in Microsoft's Windows operating systems
- NC-SI (Network Controller Sideband Interface), an electrical interface and protocol
