= The International Finance Facility for Education =

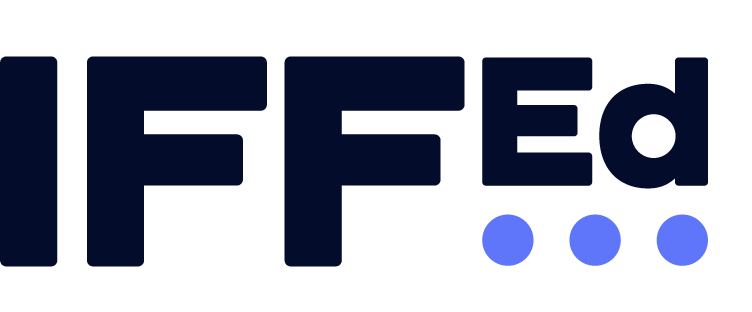
- Formation: 1 July 2024
- Headquarters: Route de Chêne 30A, c/o L&S Trust Services SA, 1208 Geneva, Switzerland
- Region served: Lower-middle-income countries (LMICs)
- Honorary President: Gordon Brown
- Founding CEO: Karthik Krishnan
- Website: https://iff-education.org/

The International Finance Facility for Education (IFFEd) is a public-philanthropic finance mechanism that supports education and skills development in lower-middle-income countries. The organisation aims to leverage donor commitments using an innovative financing mechanism and is based in Geneva, Switzerland.

== Background ==
The facility was launched in 2022 by UN Secretary-General António Guterres and Gordon Brown, the UN Special Envoy for Global Education, at the Transforming Education Summit. Karthik Krishnan was appointed founding chief executive officer and a board was established.

The concept for the IFFEd was initially proposed by the Education Commission in a 2016 report, The Learning Generation, which highlighted a worsening global learning and skills crisis. In 2018, the Facility received the endorsement of the G20 which recognised IFFEd as a significant innovation in finance development.

In 2026, IFFEd entered into a partnership with the World Bank and announced its first co-financed programme in Uzbekistan. The same year, IFFEd announced its first programme with the Asian Development Bank in India.
