= Amita Singh =

Indian political scientist

Amita Singh is an Indian political scientist, currently serving as a professor of law and governance at Jawaharlal Nehru University, in Delhi, India. She is also a member of the Indian Council of Social Science Research. She is the recipient of numerous awards, and has published widely on public administration in India. Singh has been criticized for controversial statements made regarding Dalits, Muslims, and Jammu and Kashmir.

== Career ==
Singh completed her higher education with a Ph.D. in political science from Dr. Bhimrao Ambedkar University, in Agra, Uttar Pradesh, and taught at the Vanasthali Vidyapeeth University in Rajasthan, as well as at Kamala Nehru College, Lady Shri Ram College, and PGDAV College in Delhi University. She is currently a professor at the Centre for the Study of Law and Governance, at Jawaharlal Nehru University. Singh also serves on a number of government boards and committees in relation to administration and governance. She is currently the chair of the university's Special Center for Disaster Research.

Singh gained public attention in 2016, when she described Dalit and Muslim teachers at Jawaharlal Nehru University as 'anti-national'. Following this interview, the National Commission for Scheduled Castes, the National Commission for Minorities, and the Delhi Minorities Commission sent Singh and Jawaharlal Nehru University notices asking for an explanation of her remarks, following which Jawaharlal Nehru University instituted proceedings against her as well. Singh stated to media that her comments had been taken out of context, and that she did not know that the interview would be published.

In June 2017, Singh was appointed as a member of the Indian Council of Social Science Research.

== Controversies ==
In 2016, Singh led a group of professors who accused students and other faculty members at Jawaharlal Nehru University of engaging in illegal activities, in a document that they titled Jawaharlal Nehru University: The Den of Secessionism and Terrorism, and particularly singling out students from Kashmir and North-east India, and describing Muslim and Dalit students as "anti-national". In response to her remarks, she was required to appear before the National Commission for Scheduled Castes, for her statements that targeted Dalit students, who have faced historic and ongoing discrimination on the basis of caste.

In 2019, Singh asked for the public execution of 40 Kashmiri Indian citizens in exchange for the lives of the service personnel that had been killed in the Pulwama terror attack, and in a post on Twitter, publicly accused then Kashmir Chief Minister Mehbooba Mufti of negligence. Singh subsequently reiterated these remarks in an interview with Indian Express, stating that her call for the execution of Indian citizens was so that Chief Minister Mufti would "realise what is pain."

In 2019, Singh was also the subject of a university investigation following allegations of discrimination against Muslim students at Jawaharlal Nehru University. The complaint alleged that she had referred to Muslim students at the university, in particular, those from Kashmir, as terrorists. The Jawaharlal Nehru Teachers' Association condemned the remarks and requested an inquiry into her conduct, following which Singh filed a police complaint against the teachers' association. Singh has since filed a criminal complaint against the students who complained to the university about her remarks, accusing them of attempting to incite violence.

== Awards ==
Singh is the recipient of numerous awards in relation to her work and scholarship.

Year	Award
2014	Bangladesh Nawab Bhadur Syed Nawab Ali Chowdhury National Award in the field of women's empowerment
2009	International Lifetime Achievement Award, at the International Congress of Women
2007	National Legal Aids Authority award for research on the Nithari killings
2005	E-Governance Award from the Department of Administrative Reforms, Bhubneshwar, Orissa

== Bibliography ==
- Administrative Reforms, Towards Sustainable Practices (2005, Sage Publications)
- Public Administration - Roots and Wings (2002, Galgotia Publications)
- The Politics of Environment Administration (2001, Galgotia Publications)
- Public Administration: the Grassroots Concerns (1998, Mittal Publications)
- The Political Philosophy of Bertrand Russell (1987, Mittal Publications)
