= Jharkhand War Memorial =

War memorial in Jharkhand, India

Coordinates: 23.397°N 85.387°E

- India
- For Indian soldiers from Jharkhand died in wars
- Established: 2008
- Unveiled: 31 October 2008
- Location: Dipatoli, Ranchi, Jharkhand, India
- न हन्यते हन्य माने शरीरे It does not die with the death of the body

Jharkhand War Memorial is a war memorial as a tribute to the martyrs of Jharkhand. It was established in 2008, near the Booty Chowk, Dipatoli, Ranchi.

== Overview ==
The memorial is dedicated to the soldiers from Jharkhand who had sacrificed their lives for the country from the period before independence to the current updated list. Inauguration of the Jharkhand War Memorial by His Excellency, Shri Syed Sibtey Razi, Governor of Jharkhand at Army Cantonment, Dipatoli, Ranchi occurred on 31 October 2008. The structure of the cemetery is based on the structure of the body of a person. The cemetery consists of a museum with exotic collections from Jharkhand's past; rare traditional weapons, modern weapons and models of Jharkhand's industry and heritage.

== Architecture ==
The War Memorial Museum at Birsa Munda Smriti Park occupies a 22‑acre site and is designed on a 40,000 sq ft museum block organized around a formal processional courtyard. Its exterior facade features recessed bays that display life‑size bronze statues of Jharkhand's fallen heroes. It was surrounded by full‑height LED kiosks protected by safety glass. Inside, the galleries are lined with 25 LED panels illustrating battle scenes and weaponry, alongside five 3D dioramas and over 30 sculptural figures positioned along visitor circulation paths. A specially designed alcove houses a detailed scale model of the Siachen Glacier. The sensor‑activated audio‑visual zones and a 300‑minute multi‑projector presentation narrate the personal stories of state‑born martyrs in both Hindi and English. The interior spaces of museum are designed for seamless flow, guiding guests from the central courtyard through thematic exhibits. A belt of native trees around the building provides shaded pathways and integrates the memorial into the surrounding parkland.
