= Natarajan Chandrasekaran =

Indian business executive (born 1963)

Natarajan Chandrasekaran KBE
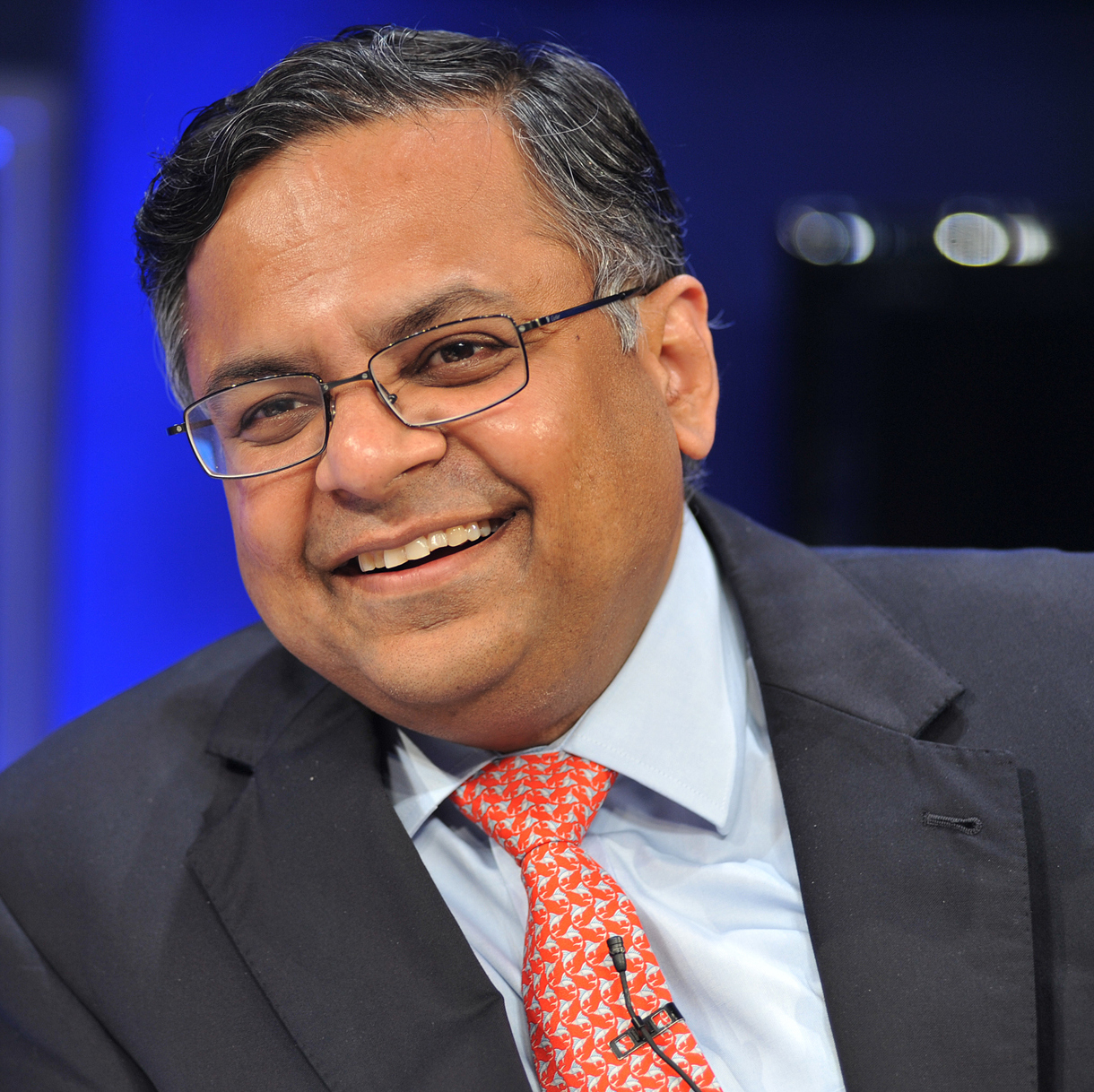
- Chandrasekaran, c. 2011

7th Chairman of Tata Group and Tata Sons
- Incumbent
- Assumed office 21 February 2017
- Preceded by: Ratan Tata

Personal details
- Born: 2 June 1963 (age 63) Namakkal, Tamil Nadu, India
- Spouse: Lalitha Chandrasekaran
- Education: Coimbatore Institute of Technology; National Institute of Technology, Tiruchirappalli
- Occupation: Businessman
- Awards: Padma Bhushan (2022); Honorary Knight Commander of the Most Excellent Order of the British Empire (2026)

Natarajan Chandrasekaran (born 2 June 1963) is an Indian business executive. He is the chairman of Tata Sons and Tata Group. He was chief operating officer (COO) and executive director of Tata Consultancy Services (TCS), where in 2009, he became chief executive officer (CEO). He was also the chairman of Tata Motors and Tata Global Beverages (TGB). He became the first non-Parsi and professional executive to head the Tata Group. He assumed the chair of B20 India and led the business agenda during India's G20 presidency in 2023. He has been embroiled in the controversy over the control of Tata Sons, where he has been accused of ignoring the rights of the majority shareholders and attempting a hostile takeover of the Tata Sons.

== Education and career ==
Chandrasekaran studied in a Tamil Medium Government school in Mohanur. He later received a Bachelor's degree in Applied Sciences from the Coimbatore Institute of Technology, Tamil Nadu. He earned his Master of Computer Applications (MCA) from the Regional Engineering College, Tiruchirappalli (now National Institute of Technology, Tiruchirappalli), in Tamil Nadu, India, in 1986. Joining TCS in 1987, Chandrasekaran took over as CEO on 6 October 2009, prior to which he was COO and executive director of TCS. Chandrasekaran is a senior member of Institute of Electrical and Electronics Engineers (IEEE), and an active member of Computer Society of India and British Computer Society. He was nominated as the chairman of Indian IT industry body NASSCOM in April 2015.

== Career ==
=== 2018–2019 NCLAT verdicts ===
The Tata Sons board voted to remove Cyrus Mistry from the Chairmanship of Tata Sons on 24 October 2016.

In July 2018, the National Company Law Tribunal (NCLT), issued a verdict in favour of Tata Sons on charges of mismanagement levelled by Mistry in 2016, two months following his ousting as chairman through a vote of non-confidence. On 10 July 2018, Mistry stated that he would appeal the decision.

In December 2019, the NCLAT reinstated Mistry as the Chairperson of Tata Sons for his remaining term, and declared that the appointment of Chandrasekaran as executive chairman was illegal.

=== 2020 Supreme Court ===
In January 2020, Tata Sons appealed to the Supreme Court of India against NCLAT's decision. Mistry stated that he would not return to the Chairmanship of the conglomerate, but was interested in reserving his seat in the company's board. A three-judge bench comprising Chief Justice Sharad Arvind Bobde and Justices B. R. Gavai and Surya Kant stayed NCLAT's order while hearing Tata Sons' appeal on 10 January 2020.

The bench stated, "We find there are lacunae in the judicial orders passed by the NCLAT."

In August 2026, Chandrasekaran announced that he would step down as Chairman of Tata Sons at the conclusion of his second term in February 2027. He has opted out of the post without seeking reappointment, following which the organisation has set up a selection committee to select the new chairman.

== Personal life ==
Chandrasekaran was born into a Tamil Brahmin family in Mohanur near Namakkal in Tamil Nadu, India. He resides in Mumbai, with his wife Lalitha. As a marathon runner, he completed his fastest marathon or personal record at TCS New York City Marathon (2014) with a finishing time of 5 hr 00 min 52 sec. He also done char dham yatra multiple times.

== Awards and recognition ==
- Chandrasekaran has received several awards and recognition in the business community, including honorary doctorates from Nyenrode Business Universiteit (2013), Jawaharlal Nehru Technological University, Hyderabad (2014), National Institute of Technology, Tiruchirappalli (2017), and Aligarh Muslim University (2021), as well as other honorary degrees from SRM Institute of Science and Technology (2010), KIIT University (2012), Gitam University (2013).
- He has also been named one of the best CEOs of the year by the Institutional Investor's Annual All-Asia Executive Team rankings (2010–2015) and Business Today (2013–2015).
- In 2014, he was named CNN-News18 Indian of the Year in the business category and voted as one of CNBC TV 18 - ‘Indian Business Icons'.
- In 2015, he earned the Qimpro Platinum Standard Award 2015 (Business).
- In 2017, India Today named him on their list of "India's 50 Most Powerful People".
- In 2016, Chandrasekaran was named board director for the Reserve Bank of India.
- He has also served as a chairperson on various boards, including for NASSCOM (2012–2013) and IT Industry Governors’ at the WEF, Davos (2015–2016).
- In March 2022, the Government of India honoured him with Padma Bhushan for excellence in Trade and Industry.
- On 16 May 2023, he was awarded as Knight of the Legion of Honour by the President of France Emmanuel Macron.
- He has also received the Frans Banninck Cocq Medal from the Dutch city Amsterdam.
- In February 2024, he received the Special Jury Award at the EY Entrepreneur of the Year Award 2023 (India)
- In March 2026, Natarajan felicitated an honorary knighthood by the British government for his outstanding contribution to strengthening India-UK business relationship.

== See also ==
- Tata Sons
- Indian Institute of Management Lucknow
- Jamshed Jiji Irani

Business positions
Preceded by Ratan Tata	Chairman of Tata Group; 2017–present	Incumbent
