= Govind Ballabh Pant Social Science Institute =

Research institute at Allahabad University

The Govind Ballabh Pant Social Science Institute (GBPSSI) is a research institute located in Jhusi in Prayagraj district of India. It is one of the 14 institutes establishments in India established by Indian Council of Social Science and Research.

Established in 1980 as one in the network of Social Science Research Institutes, which the Indian Council of Social Science Research (ICSSR) set up in association with the state governments, the institute entered privileges of the University of Allahabad in 2005. The institute undertakes interdisciplinary research in the field of social sciences. The main areas of research at the Institute include development planning and policy, environment, health and population, human development, rural development and management, culture, power and change, democracy and institutions.

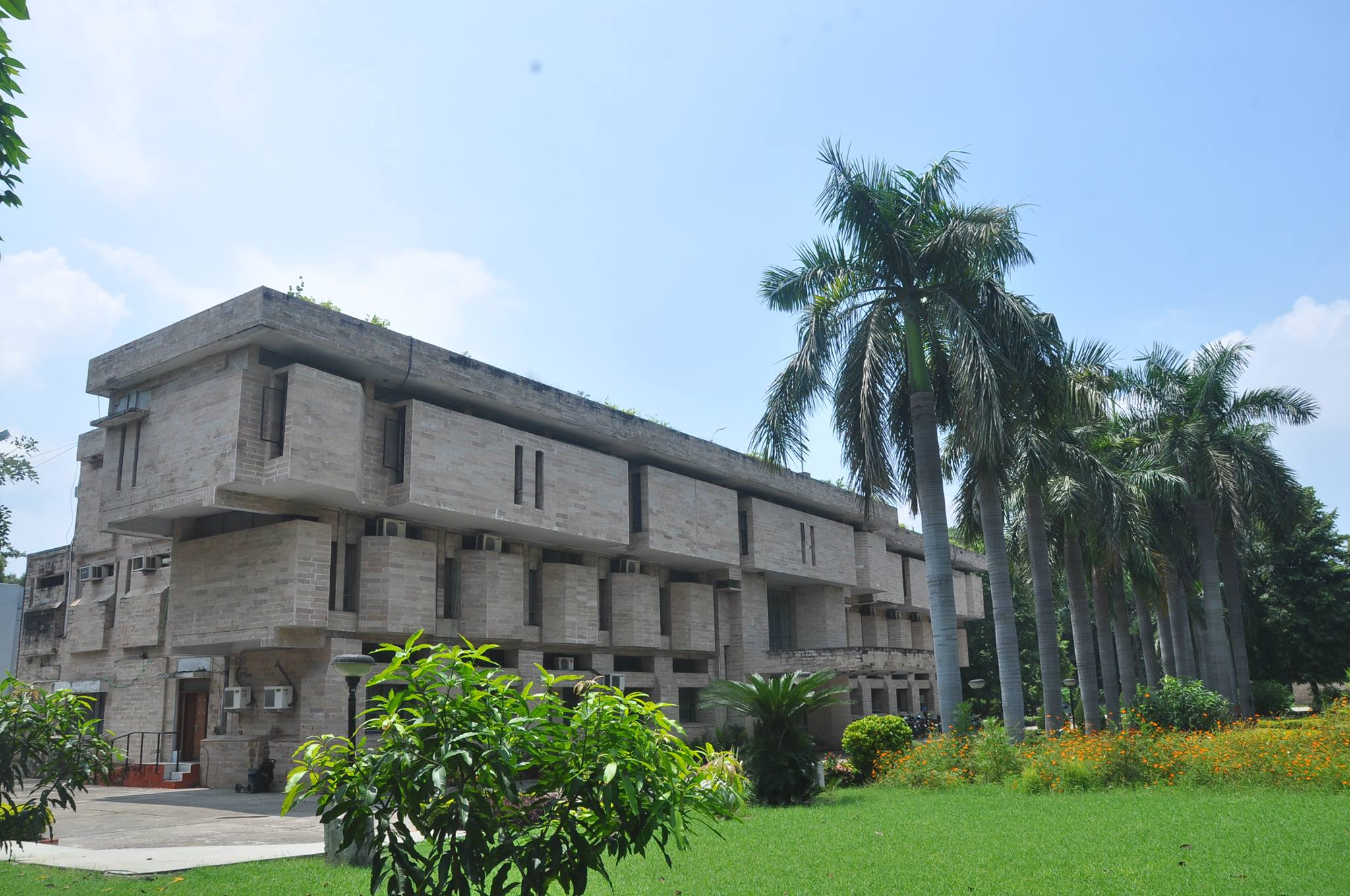
Govind Ballabh Pant Social Science Institute

== History ==
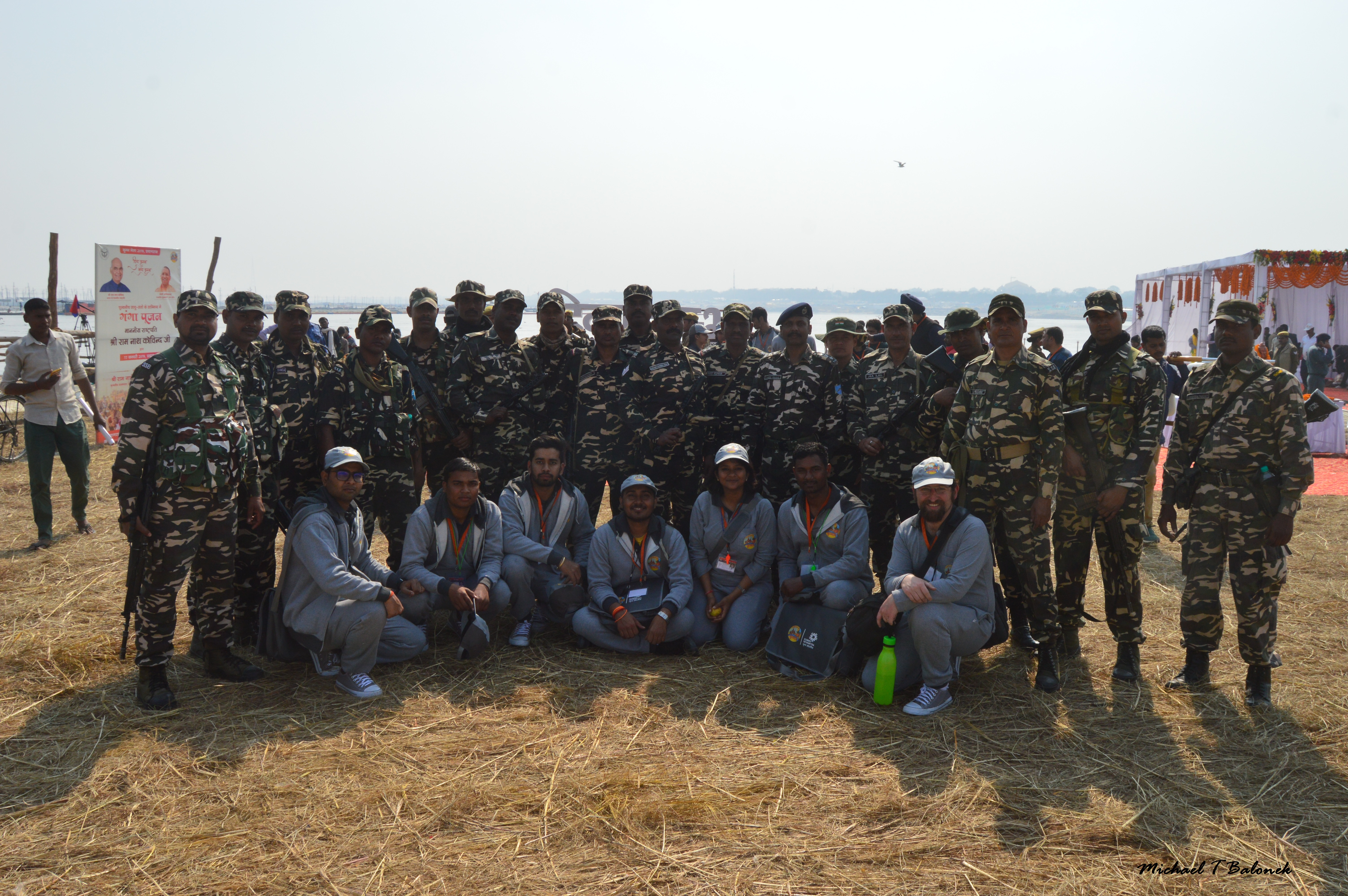
Kumbh Mela 2019 - GBPSSI students helping the UP Police and Military (Kumbh SevaMitra)

The G. B. Pant Samajik Vigyan Sansthan (Social Science Institute) was set up at the initiative of the government of Uttar Pradesh. Pd. Kamalapati Tripathi, the then chief minister of UP wrote a letter to Shri S. Nurul Hasan, Education Minister, Government of India, in 1972, expressing the desire of the government of UP to set up an Institute for Social Science Research at Allahabad (Prayagraj). The proposal was backed by two subsequent chief ministers of the state.

The government of India subsequently constituted a committee under the chairmanship of Prof S. Chakravarty, Member, Planning Commission, to work out the details. The committee recommended in 1975 that a non-recurring grant-in-aid of Rs. 50 lakh be made to the institute, to be shared equally by the ICSSR and the GoUP, and a recurring grant of Rs. 10 lakh be made to the Institute per year, to be shared equally by the iCSSR and the GoUP. On the recommendation of the Chakravarty committee, the government of India decided in 1975 to approve the request of the UP government to set up an Institute in Allahabad in collaboration with the Central government. It was decided that the proposed Institute would be supported under the grants-in-aid scheme of the ICSSR for financial assistance to Research Institutes doing research in the field of social sciences. It was further decided that the government of India and the UP government would provide funds to the institute on a matching basis. This recommendation was accepted in principle by both the ICSSR and the GoUP.

The Indian Council for Social Science Research started providing funds to the Institute starting from 1976 to 1977. Subsequently, the Government of Uttar Pradesh took a decision to fund the institute on a matching basis from 1979 to 1980 and an initial grant of Rupees one lakh was made to the Institute in July 1979.

The institute was registered as a society in the year 1980 by representatives of the government of UP, the central government, and the ICSSR. Prof. A. D. Pant, became the director of the institute after it became a registered entity in 1980, succeeding Prof. S. C. Dube who was director of the institute up to 1979.

The institute became a constituent institute of the University of Allahabad, after the university became a central university in July 2005. Its structure and its relationship with the University of Allahabad is now governed by the ordinances of the university. Specifically, Ordinance XXXIV of the University of Allahabad lays down the basic structure of the constituent institutes of the university. The central government also decided to fund the institute through the UGC and the University of Allahabad.

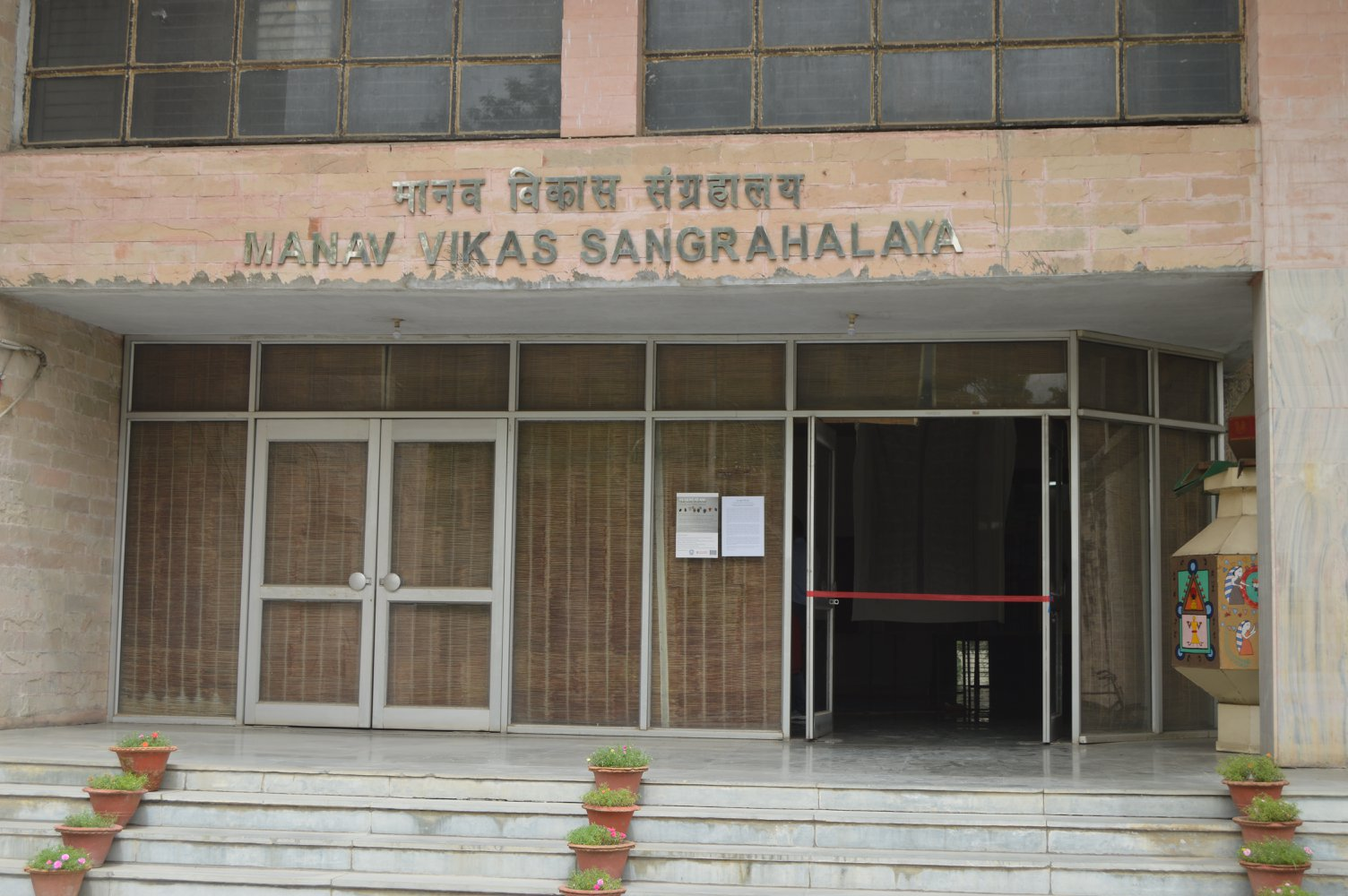
Manav Vikas Sanrahalaya

== Campus ==
The campus is situated on the National Highway No. 2, also called the famous G.T. Road (also linking Allahabad to Varanasi). It is about 10 km. from Allahabad Junction Railway station and 1 km. from Triveni Sangam. The institute has a campus spread over 10 acres. It has its own water supply system. As a supportive measure for uninterrupted power supply, the institute has installed a 62.5 KVA electricity generator.

=== Library ===
The institute has a library that serves as a national collection of books, archival material, journals and recent documentation for studies and research and development, management and ethnography. It has over 50,000 books, archival material and documentation of studies and research in almost all social science disciplines and subscribes to 150 national and international journals. The library has access to INFLIBNET.

== Academics ==
=== Academic programmes ===
The only postgraduate professional course apart from research courses (Ph.D./M.Phil/D.Phil/and Various Fellowships) offered by the institute is the two-year full-time Masters of Business Administration- Rural Development, MBA (RD) which was initiated in 2001.

=== Admission ===
Mode of Admission to this institute is only by completing an entrance exam organized by the University of Allahabad.

=== Manav Vikas Sangrahalaya (The Museum of Development of Man) ===
The museum is a part of GBPSSI. It has four permanent galleries and occasional temporary exhibits. The permanent galleries feature the cultural archeological history of India, the physical and cultural archeological history of the Ganges river basin, photo exhibits of the history of Hinduism's Bhakti movement, and a gallery featuring the history of migration.

The Manav Vikas Sangrahalaya came into being in January 2001. This museum aims at preserving and highlighting the folk cultures, local traditions and heritage of India. It portrays the living, vibrant and dynamic aspects of Indian folk and cultural traditions which have played a role in the socio-economic development of the country, particularly UP and its neighboring regions. Besides preserving and providing sustenance to cultural attributes of the society such as tribal and folk arts, literature, sports, local skills etc., it also aims to preserve and document indigenous knowledge systems in various areas and also tools, technologies and modes of production.

Display section

The display section of the museum is an integral and complementary part of the research wing. The artifacts displayed focus on art and culture of different communities of India. At present, there are two galleries in the museum. The first is the Manav Vikas ki Katha and the second one is the Ganga River Culture gallery. The gallery displaying Manav Vikas ki Katha highlights the march of civilization since prehistoric times. It presents a history of the development, particularly socio-economic, of human civilization in the specific context of north India. The other gallery, the Ganga River Culture gallery, represents the socioeconomic and cultural continuity and change along the Ganga River belt through paintings, photographs, artifacts, and models.

Outreach activities

Apart from its display unit, the museum is also involved in carrying out academic research, popular activities and activities that aim to reach out to lesser-known marginalized communities. Since its inception in 2001, the museum has been organizing various workshops and training programmes for children during the summer vacations under the banners of Art for Social Change and Theatre for Social Change. Every year a programme called Chetna Parva (a social knowledge awareness programme) is conducted for school children in which children belonging to different schools of the city visit the museum and are given a lecture by social scientists on social issues. Training programmes are also organized for women in which they are taught indigenous skills that can help to empower them economically and socially.

As a part of the intervention activities among marginalized communities, the museum has been carrying out programmes to enhance the cultural identity of marginalized communities through cultural skills, traditions and performances. Under its programme on Identity and Development workshops like Zindagi Nadi Kinare (with the Nishads) and Hunar (with the various lower caste communities of Shahabpur), were organized in the last few years. Other intervention programmes included sensitizing rural communities about the problem of water scarcity through their own cultural resources. A cultural station is in the process of being established in Shahabpur, which is aimed at using culture as a tool for development of the communities living in the village.

Research and documentation

Manav Vikas Sangrahalaya as a part of the Centre of Culture and Change also carries out research projects. One project that is underway is 'Myth, Memory and Politics: A study of the language of mobilization of grassroot dalits' funded by ICSSR. Another project the museum is involved in is 'Bidesia: Migration, Change and Diasporic Culture' -an international project based in three countries namely Holland, Surinam and India, funded by Netherland Cultural Fund, Prince Claus Fund and Monderian, Amsterdam. Another is the Modernization and Extension of Galleries, funded by the Ministry of Culture, Government of India. A new gallery on the story of Bhojpuri migrants under the colonial period is also in the process of being developed. This gallery is being supported by KIT, Amsterdam and the Netherland Cultural Fund.

The museum has institutional collaboration with various institutions working in the field of culture like IGRMS, Bhopal; NCZCC, Allahabad; Anand Bhawan, Allahabad; Department of Culture, UP government and government of India, and KIT Tropen Museum, Amsterdam.

=== Kumbh Research Centre ===
In 2020, the government of Uttar Pradesh created the "Kumbh Research Centre." As the Kumbh Mela happens nearby every six years, the Uttar Pradesh government and GBPSSI leadership decided to house a permanent research centre at GBPSSI; research from previous Kumbh Melas can be securely stored and available in one central location, and which would sponsor future research

== Research ==
The institute in its thirty-third year, continues to pursue its research in the area of contemporary relevance, moving from local to global and back to local concerns transversing in the heterogeneity of time and space. The research extends into the changing scenario of India and a de-territorialized global socio-cultural world. One of the thematic areas of research emerging in the institute is around various kinds of marginalities produced by the traditional structures and the globalizing world.

== Alumni association ==
The Govind Ballabh Pant Social Science Institute Alumni Association (GBPSSI-AAN) is the alumni association of the Govind Ballabh Pant Social Science Institute (GBPSSI), Prayagraj, Uttar Pradesh. The association brings together former students and alumni of the institute and provides a platform for alumni networking, professional engagement, mentoring, institutional interaction and alumni activities.

The association was formed and registered on 16 November 2019 as a society under the Societies Registration Act, 1860, as applicable in Uttar Pradesh.

=== Objectives and activities ===
The association's activities include maintaining connections among alumni, facilitating interaction between alumni and the institute, supporting professional and academic networking, and organising alumni meetings, reunions, lectures and other programmes.

The association also undertakes activities related to alumni engagement, institutional outreach and the documentation of the institute's alumni history and achievements.

=== Governance ===
The association is governed by an executive committee. The current executive committee includes:

Position	Name
President	Shantanu Saurabh
Vice-President	Mudit Kumar Singh
General Secretary	Devesh Kumar Srivastava
Secretary	Snehlata Chaudhary
Treasurer	Ravi Sharma
Executive Member	Ravinder Singh
Executive Member	Prabhat Dwivedi
Nominated Executive Member	Rewa Singh
Nominated Executive Member	Chandraiah Gopani

=== Previous executive committee ===
The earlier executive committee included:

Position	Name
President	Vinay Kumar Mishra
Vice-President	Shantanu Saurabh
General Secretary	Mandan Mishra
Secretary	Ashish Kumar Tripathi
Treasurer	Devesh Kumar Srivastav
Executive Member	Mudit Kumar Singh
Executive Member	Angita Raghuwanshi

During its development, members of the association have contributed to organisational, technological and documentation activities. Devesh Kumar Srivastava contributed voluntarily to the association's website and other technology-related work. Angita Raghuwanshi contributed to documenting the association's history and preparation of information about the association. Vinay Kumar Mishra contributed to the association's early organisational development while serving as president. Shantanu Saurabh, who previously served as vice-president and subsequently became president, has also been involved in organisational development, alumni activities and institutional engagement.

=== Alumni engagement ===
GBPSSI-AAN organises and supports alumni-oriented programmes and interactions intended to maintain links between former students and the institute. These activities provide opportunities for alumni to reconnect with one another, interact with current members of the institute and participate in professional and institutional initiatives.

The association also maintains an online presence for communicating with alumni and documenting alumni-related activities.
