= National Social Science Documentation Centre =

Indian research center

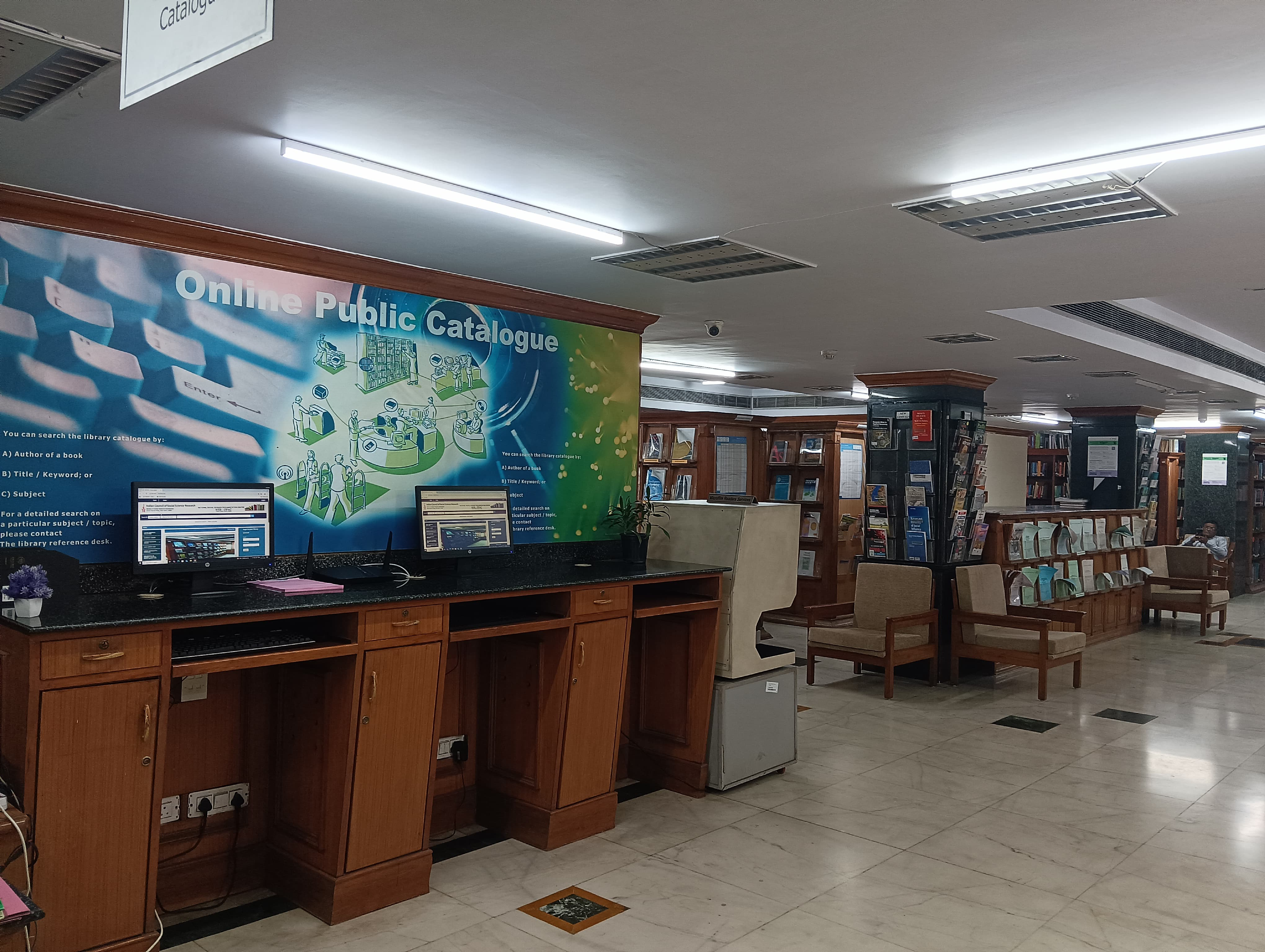
OPAC

National Social Science Documentation Centre (commonly abbreviated as NASSDOC) is an Indian national-level documentation, library, and information services center for the social sciences. It is a division of the Indian Council of Social Science Research (ICSSR) and plays a central role in supporting research, documentation, and dissemination of social science knowledge in India.

== History and Background ==
NASSDOC was established in 1970 as a division of the ICSSR. Its primary purpose is from inception, to provide library and information support to social science researchers across India—especially those in academic institutions, autonomous research organizations, government departments, policy and planning units, and the social science community at large.

Over the decades, NASSDOC has expanded in terms of services, automation, digital infrastructure, and outreach to ICSSR’s regional centres and other research institutions. ICSSR provides grants to 27 research institutes and six regional centers in India.

== Mission and Objectives ==
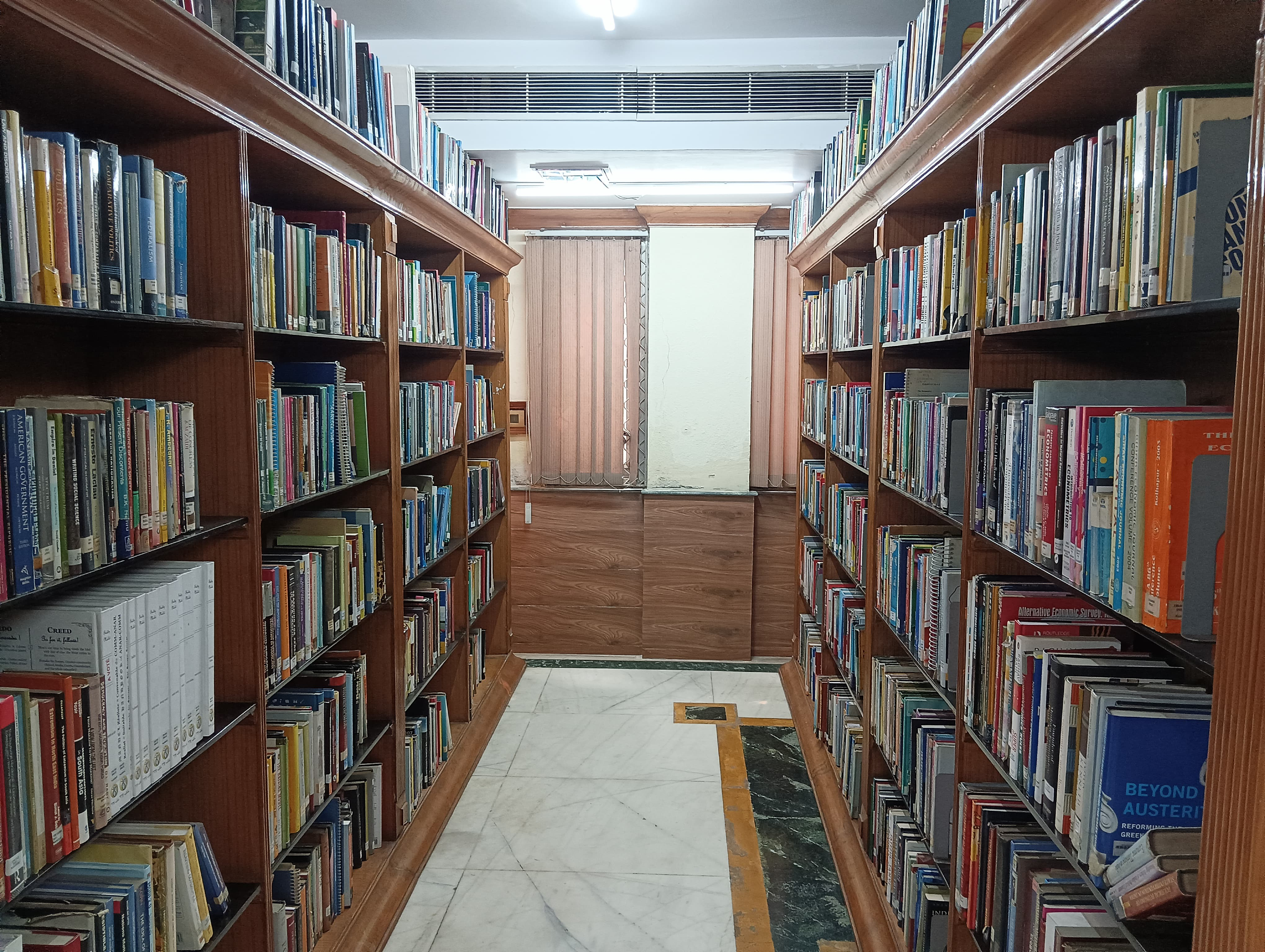
Book Shelve

NASSDOC’s mission centers on facilitating social science research by ensuring the collection, preservation, dissemination, and accessibility of relevant documents and information. Its objectives include:

1. Providing robust library, documentation, and reference support to social science researchers and institutions.
2. Acquiring and preserving social science content—especially materials that are not otherwise widely available (e.g., unpublished PhD theses, research reports, government documents, institutional publications)
3. Producing and maintaining bibliographic databases, union catalogues, indices, directories, and other location tools to help researchers find relevant materials.
4. Enabling literature search, document delivery, interlibrary loan, reprography, and reference services to support scholar needs.
5. Organizing continuing education, training workshops, seminars, and skill-building for librarians, information professionals, and researchers to use emerging technologies, digital tools, and methodologies.
6. Extending support and guidance to the libraries and documentation units of ICSSR regional centres, ICSSR-supported research institutes, and affiliated social science libraries.
7. Expanding the digital reach of its collections, including digitization of theses, development of an e-library portal, and remote access to e-resources for registered users.

== Facilities, Infrastructure, and Collections ==
=== Physical Infrastructure and Reading Room ===
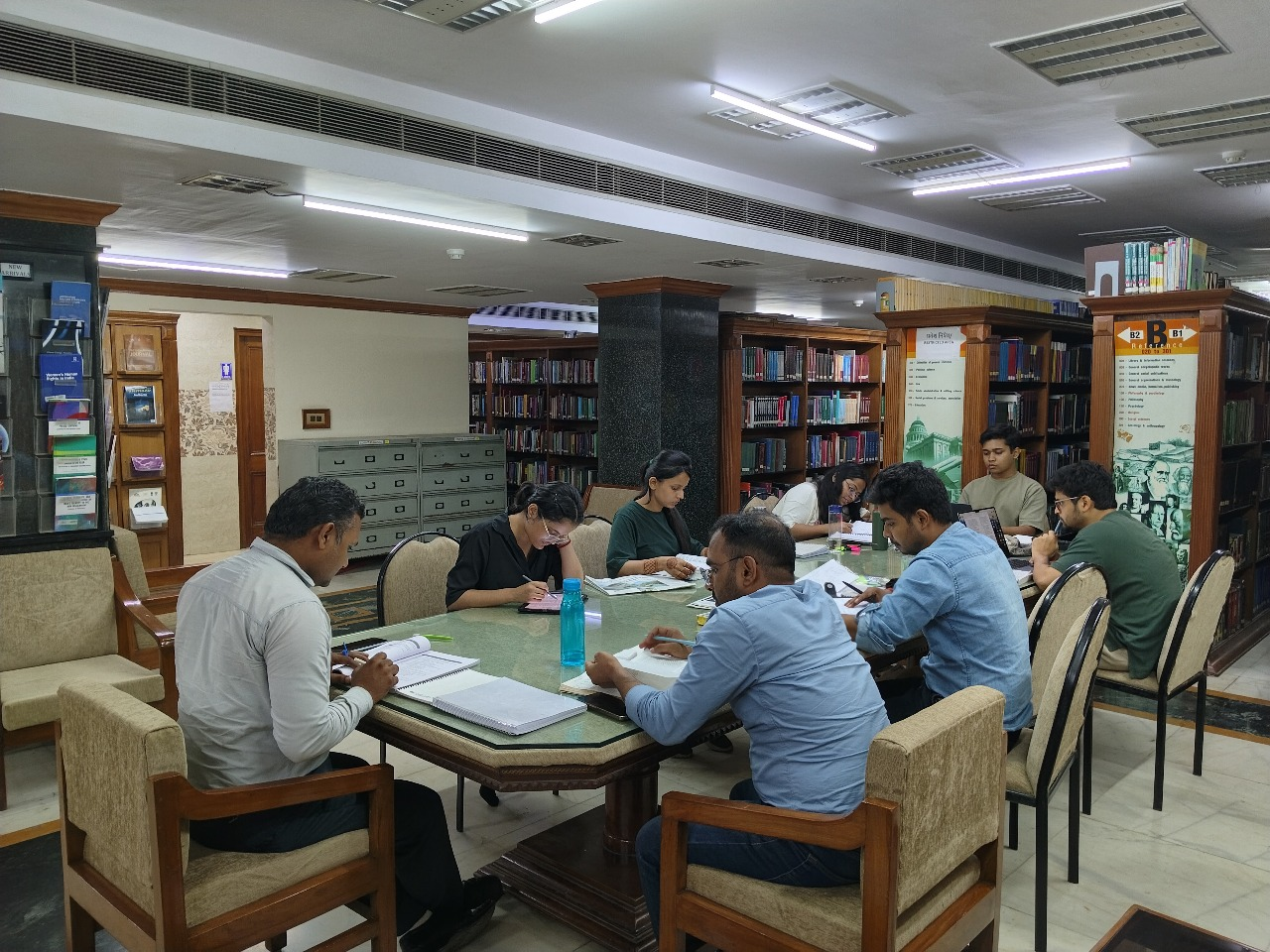

NASSDOC maintains a reading room (often referred to as the NASSDOC Reading Room) that is open to researchers. Typically, it operates Monday through Saturday (closed on Sundays and gazette holidays) from 9:30 AM to 6:00 PM. The reading room houses reference materials, periodicals, theses, project reports, and other special collections that users can consult on-site.

=== Collections and Holdings ===
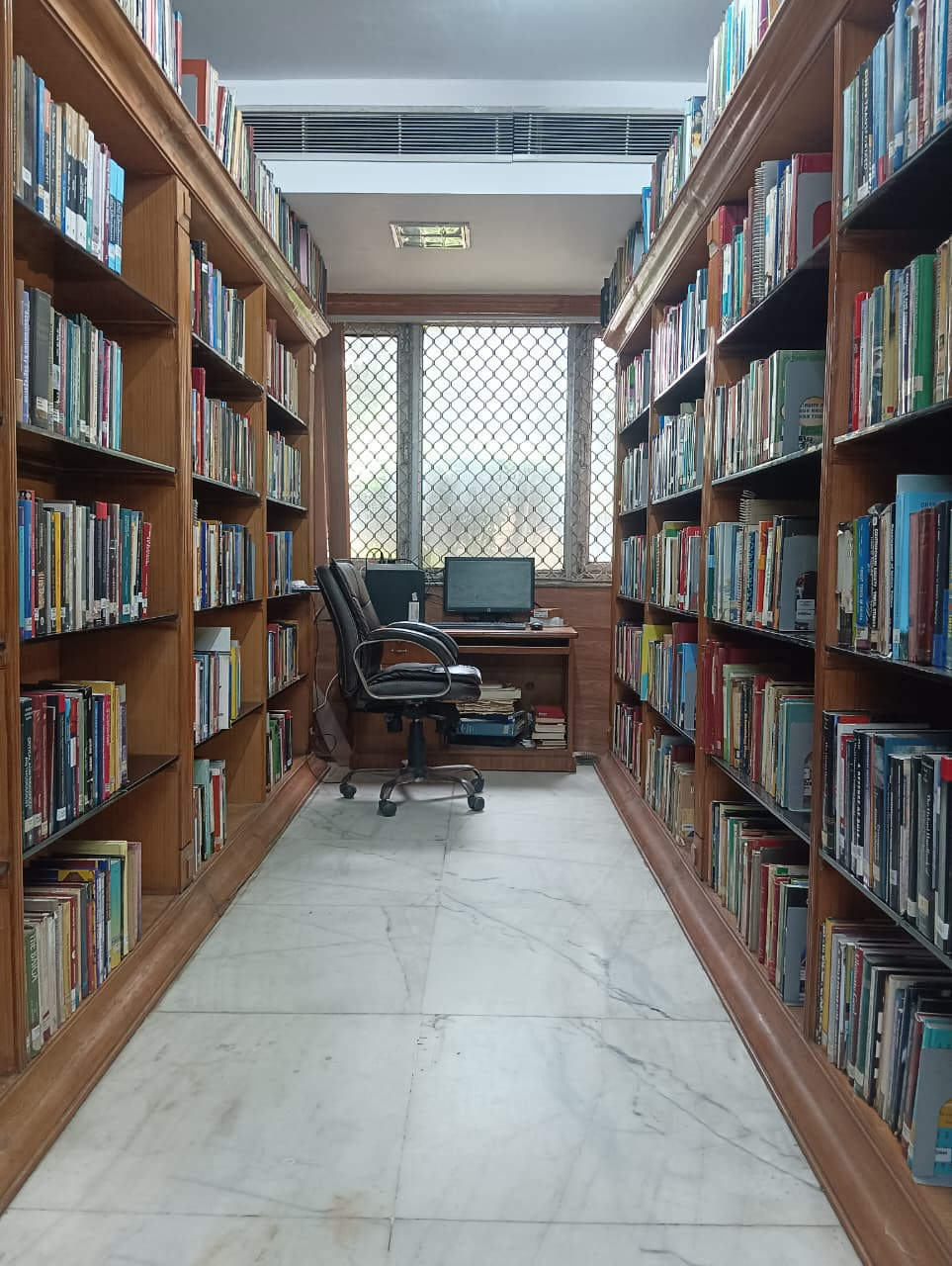
Library Collection

NASSDOC has built a robust collection over the years in both print and electronic formats. Some key components include:

Books and Monographs on social science disciplines, research methods, information science, policy studies, etc.

Doctoral Theses / Dissertations: NASSDOC has acquired copies of unpublished PhD theses in social sciences from Indian universities.

Research Project Reports (such as those funded by ICSSR and other agencies) and institutional reports.

Periodicals (Indian and foreign social science journals), both current and back volumes, including abstracting and indexing journals, plus bound journal volumes.

Government Documents / Serial Reports and institutional publications (grey literature).

Microfilms / Microfiche of theses, journals, working papers, and other rare materials.

Digital / Electronic Collections: CD-ROM databases, online databases, institutional and in-house databases.

As of recent summaries, the collection metrics include (approximate figures):

Material Type	Quantity / Estimate
Books (social science)	19430+
Doctoral Thesis (print + CD-ROM)	5490+
Research Project Reports	3910+
Journals	450+
Back Volumes / Bound Periodicals	12,500+
Microfilms / Microfiche	3,000+
Online / Electronic Databases	11 major e-resources
Special Collection- M.K. Gandhi, Guru Nanak Dev ji	136

These figures are indicative and subject to updates as the library continues to grow, digitize, and streamline its holdings.

=== Automation, Catalogues and Metadata ===
To enhance discoverability and interoperability, NASSDOC has adopted library automation and cataloguing practices:

WebOPAC / Online Catalogue: NASSDOC provides a Web-based Online Public Access Catalogue (WebOPAC) to enable users to search through the library’s holdings across books, theses, reports, etc.

Retro-conversion and MARC records: Catalog records have been converted to machine-readable form (e.g. UNIMARC) to support sharing and library networking.

In-house Databases / Locating Tools: NASSDOC develops various bibliographic tools, union catalogues, directories, indices, and databases (both in print and digital) to assist users in locating relevant social science literature.

Digitization Projects: As part of modernization, NASSDOC has digitized portions of its collections (e.g., theses, periodical literature) and works to increase its digital repository capacity.

== Services and User Support ==
NASSDOC offers a wide range of user-facing and backend services designed to support social science research.

=== Membership and Access ===
NASSDOC provides different membership categories for accessing its resources and services: Official Members - These include ICSSR Council Members/ senior officials of the ICSSR secretariat and regular professional staff of the ICSSR (i.e. Research Assistants/Documentation Assistants and above). They are entitled to borrow books from the library for 15 days.

- Consulting Members - Consultation facility is extended to academicians, research scholars, students, ICSSR Beneficiaries and members of general public that may include retired persons and other categories of readers. Consultation membership fee is Rs. 1200 per annum (minimum Rs. 200 for one month).
- Borrowing Members - Borrowing facility is extended to social scientists, academicians, students and general readers who are registered as members of the library. Books are issued against a security deposit of Rs.1000/- per book. A maximum of two books can be issued to individual members at a time.
- Institutional Members - This category of membership is available exclusively to institutions upon payment of ₹10,000 per year. Institutional members are entitled to borrow up to five (5) books at a time for a period of one month. However, remote login access to the subscribed e-resources is not available under this membership.
- Guest Members - There is no fee for guest readers who want to consult the library for a day or two. They are issued a guest card for the day. Thresholds and fees (deposit, membership rates) are periodically updated by the institution.

== Reference and Literature Search Services ==
- Reference Service: Users can request help in locating books, reports, theses, or other literature. Staff respond via email, telephone, fax, or in-person.
- Literature Search: NASSDOC conducts topic-based literature searches using internal and external databases, indexing tools, and bibliographic resources to assist users in comprehensive coverage.
- Bibliography on Demand: Upon request, NASSDOC compiles bibliographies (with or without abstracts) for special topics, often as a paid service. This is particularly valuable to users in remote or underserved regions.

== Document Delivery, Inter Library Loan and Reprographic Service ==
- Document Delivery Service: NASSDOC facilitates delivery of documents (books, journal articles, reports) either by borrowing via interlibrary loan (ILL) or providing photocopies of requested materials.
- Interlibrary Loan: NASSDOC participates in loan arrangements with other libraries to fulfill user demands for materials not held locally.
- Reprography / Photocopying Services: Users may request photocopies of selected portions of materials (within copyright constraints).

== Continuing Education, Training and Outreach Programmes ==
Recognizing that many scholars and librarians may need new skills to adapt to digital systems, NASSDOC organizes:

- Short-term workshops, seminars, and lectures on information technology, digital tools, library science, and social science research methods Internships and apprenticeship programs: For MLIS / BLIS students, NASSDOC may offer training, orientation, and exposure to real-world library operations
- Outreach and professional networking: NASSDOC is a member of library associations (IASLIC, ILA, IFLA, DELNET) and collaborates with ICSSR regional centres to propagate best practices. Sales, Distribution and Publishing Support
- Financial Assistance for Projects: It offers grants for documentation, bibliographic, and library-oriented projects (e.g. development of guides, catalogues, bibliometric studies). Study Grant Scheme: To assist PhD scholars to visit libraries in other cities for their research work; travel, lodging, and allowance support for limited duration visits.

== Electronic Resources and Digital Infrastructures ==
With the growth of digital scholarship and online information, NASSDOC has made significant investments in e-resources and digital infrastructure. ICSSR consortia has been initiated in October 2007 with 5 ICSSR research institutions while setting up of NASSDOC as a hub and facilitator for consortia based subscription to e-resources by subscribing to JSTOR.

=== E-Resources Subscriptions and Access ===
NASSDOC subscribes to a suite of electronic resources tailored for social science research. Some known subscriptions include:

Brill Journals: Publishes over 800 peer-reviewed journals and 3,500 books annually in humanities and social sciences, with full digital archives and indexing in Web of Science and Scopus.

Cambridge University Press eBooks: Provides access to 572 e-Books in social sciences from a collection exceeding 40,000 titles.

CPDx (CMIE): Offers detailed data on household consumption, income, and savings in India, covering over 240,000 households.

IndiaStat: A statistical database offering socio-economic data across sectors such as agriculture, education, health, and environment, with 56 associated websites.

J-Gate: An e-journal gateway indexing over 26,000 journals in social sciences and humanities, linking to more than 11 million articles.

JSTOR: An archival database providing access to over 2,800 academic journals in 75 disciplines, including economics, sociology, and education.

Prowess IQ (CMIE): A database on 55,000+ Indian firms containing financial and industrial data since 1989.

Sage Research Methods: Offers 1,000+ resources, including books, videos, and case studies to support all stages of research.

Scopus (Elsevier): A multidisciplinary citation database indexing over 44,000 journals and 22,000 books.

Statcraft: A web-based analytics platform using R language for statistical analysis and visualization.

Statista: A business intelligence platform providing data on 80,000 topics across 170 industries worldwide.

== ONOS Subscribed E-Resources (Social Science Focused) ==
Under the One Nation One Subscription (ONOS) initiative of the Government of India, NASSDOC provides additional access to key social science e-resources for academic and research purposes.

=== Major ONOS Resources ===
Annual Reviews: Publishes 67 journals, including 19 in social sciences and economics.

Cambridge University Press Journals: Offers 420 peer-reviewed journals across humanities and social sciences.

Elsevier ScienceDirect: Provides access to 979 social science and humanities journals.

Emerald Publishing: Features 300+ journals in management, education, policy, and sociology.

IndianJournals.com: Hosts 267 Indian academic journals in social sciences, business, and agriculture.

Oxford University Press Journals: Provides 500 journals, including 106 in social sciences and 83 in humanities.

Project MUSE: Hosts 800+ journals and open access content in humanities and social sciences.

SAGE Journals: Offers over 1,440 journals, including 200 open-access titles.

Springer Nature: Provides access to 461 journals in social sciences and related fields.

Taylor & Francis: Publishes 660 journals in economics, law, geography, and international studies.

Wiley Journals: Offers 2,000 journals globally, including 18 in social sciences and humanities.

== E-Library Portal and Remote Access ==
NASSDOC maintains an E-Library Portal (also referred to as NASSDOC Online Digital Resources Access Portal) which allows remote access to subscribed electronic databases for eligible users. Users outside the physical premises can log in, given valid credentials, to access e-journals, e-books, and related digital content.

=== Digitization and Repository Initiatives ===
Theses Digitization: NASSDOC has digitized over 2,000 PhD theses and made them available on CD-ROM. The long-term objective is to host them online for researcher access.

Indian Social Science Periodical Literature (INSSPEL): NASSDOC undertook a project to digitize Indian social science periodical literature published in 119 journals since inception until 1970. The digitization includes about 97,492 references.

Institutional Repository and Digital Projects: NASSDOC is working toward creating digital repositories for research project reports, union catalog integration, subject gateways, and mobile access.

== Governance, Network, and Partnerships ==
=== Administrative Structure ===
As a division of ICSSR, NASSDOC is governed under the ICSSR’s administrative framework. The institution aligns its mission and budgetary support with the broader goals of promoting social science research in India.

=== Network with ICSSR Regional Centres & Institutes ===
One of NASSDOC’s core functions is to assist and coordinate with ICSSR Regional Centres and ICSSR-supported research institutes, offering them library guidance, resource sharing, and linking their catalogues. NASSDOC envisions integrating or joining WebOPAC and cataloguing networks across ICSSR-affiliated institutions.

=== Membership in Library and Information Networks ===
NASSDOC is affiliated with key professional bodies and network partnerships such as: Indian Association of Special Libraries and Information Centres (IASLIC) Indian Library Association (ILA)International Federation of Library Associations and Institutions (IFLA) Developing Library Network (DELNET)These partnerships help NASSDOC in resource sharing, training, standard adoption, and networking across libraries in India.

== Evaluation, User Perception, and Challenges ==
=== User Satisfaction and Environment ===
Studies on work environment in libraries surveyed library professionals across categories including NASSDOC and found that the cumulative perception of “work environment” was positive (71.3% agreement). In particular, special libraries (which include NASSDOC) scored 72.2% in that survey, indicating relatively favorable conditions among staff. However, such studies are library-general and not NASSDOC-specific. They reflect perceptions across institutions, including issues such as lighting, ventilation, social relationships, job prestige and recreational facilities. A recent survey conducted by the National Social Science Documentation Centre (NASSDOC) of the ICSSR revealed the existence of about 1,200 research institutes in India.

== Impact and Significance ==
NASSDOC plays a crucial role in the Indian social sciences ecosystem: It bridges information gaps by collecting rare, unpublished, or less circulated documents that are often unavailable elsewhere. Its bibliographic databases, catalogues, and union listings reduce duplication, improve discovery, and enhance resource sharing among libraries. Through training and outreach, NASSDOC helps build capacity among librarians, researchers, and information professionals to adopt new tools and methodologies. As a central hub for ICSSR’s research infrastructure, it helps maintain coherence, standardization, and inter-institutional linkages across the social science research community. Its digital and e-resource initiatives contribute to democratizing access to research, especially for scholars located outside major metropolitan centres. The underlying objective of ICSSR is to promote research in social sciences. There are 24 research institutions affiliated to and funded by ICSSR for carrying out research and training programmes in various social science disciplines.

== See also ==
- Indian Council of Social Science Research
