= M. J. Xavier =

Indian business theorist (born 1955)

M.J. Xavier
- Born: 4 August 1955 (age 71); Kovilpatti, Tamil Nadu, India
- Education: Indian Institute of Management Calcutta, National Institute of Technology, Warangal, Coimbatore Institute of Technology
- Spouse: Jaya
- Awards: DMA-Escorts Award for the Best Management Book of the Year 1999; Chanakya Award for Innovative Leadership 2012; Amity Academic Excellence Award 2012
- Scientific career
- Fields: Marketing research, strategic marketing
- Workplaces: Indian Institute of Management Ranchi

M. J. Xavier is the founding director of Indian Institute of Management Ranchi (IIM Ranchi) With more than 25 years of professional experience in teaching, research, academic administration and industry, Xavier specialises in marketing research and strategic marketing. His book, Strategic Marketing, won the DMA-Escorts Award for the best Management Book of the Year 1999. He carefully designed the curriculum for IIM Ranchi based on the motto of "Thought leadership through Erudite Fusion"

== Professional background ==
Xavier obtained his Doctorate in Management (1984) from the Indian Institute of Management Calcutta. He was originally an engineer with an M.Tech. (1979) in Chemical Plant Engineering from Regional Engineering College, Warangal and B.Tech. (1976) in Chemical Engineering from Coimbatore Institute of Technology.

He served as a Research Executive in Mode Research Pvt. Ltd., Calcutta (1982–84) and as Manager in-charge of Management Development and Services with SPIC Ltd., Chennai(1985–91). He taught at XLRI, Jamshedpur (1984-84), IIM Bangalore (1991–96), IFMR Chennai (1998–2006) and Great Lakes Institute of Management, Chennai (2008–2010).

His areas of interest include marketing research, data mining, e-governance and spirituality. He conducted a number of training programmes for executives and has also been a consultant to several companies in India and abroad.

He authored three books and published more than 100 articles in journals and magazines in India and abroad. His book Marketing in the New Millennium won the DMA-Escorts Award for the best Management Book of the Year 1999.

He served as Visiting Faculty to a number of business schools in India and abroad including the University of Buckingham, U.K. (1993), the Texas Christian University, U.S. (1999), California Polytechnic State University, U.S. (2003–2005) and the American University of Armenia, Armenia (2006)., Postgraduate Institute of Management, University of Sri Jayawardenapura (Sri Lanka).
