= Karthik Krishnan =

Indian-American businessman and professor

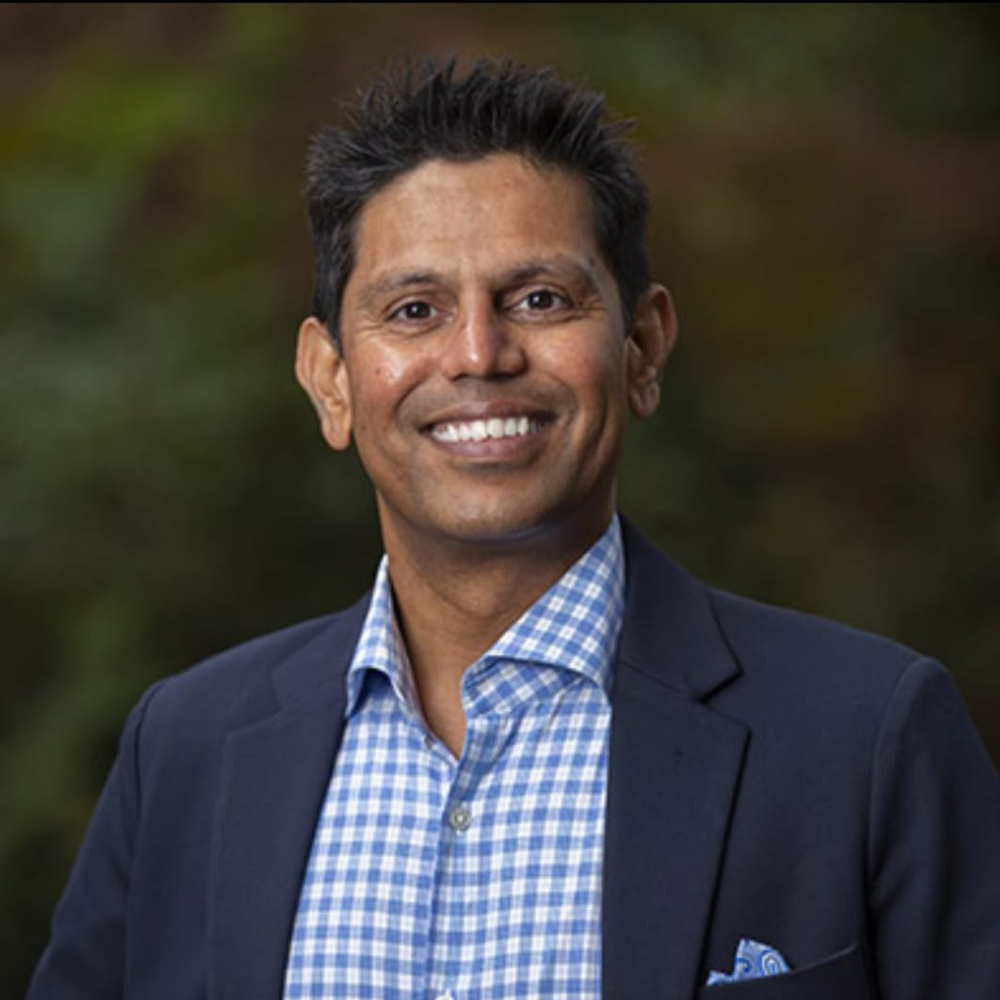
- Krishnan in 2023
- Born: Chennai, India
- Education: (BEng); Coimbatore Institute of Technology (MBA); New York University
- Occupations: Businessman; professor

Karthik Krishnan is an Indian-American businessman and professor. He is the CEO of the International Finance Facility for Education, a financing initiative launched in 2022 to address educational issued on a global level. He was previously the CEO of Britannica Group.

Krishnan is an adjunct professor at the Stern School of Business, New York University.

== Early life and education ==
Krishnan was born and raised in Chennai, Tamil Nadu. He did his schooling at G.K Shetty Vivekananda Vidyalaya, Ambattur, and T.I. Matriculation Higher Secondary School, Ambattur. He went to the Coimbatore Institute of Technology and graduated in 1995 with a bachelor's degree in engineering. In 2006, he received his master's degree in business administration from Stern School of Business, New York.

== Career ==
Krishnan joined Encyclopædia Britannica in November 2017. He introduced Britannica Insights, a Google Chrome browser extension, and then Britannica School Insights, which supplied comparable content for subscribers of Britannica's online classroom solutions and a partnership with YouTube on various conspiracy theories at the platform.

Krishnan has also authored and published articles on various technology and education-based topics.
