= Shodhganga =

Indian digital repository of theses and dissertations

- Location: India
- Type: Digital repository, digital library
- Established: 2011
- Reference to legal mandate: UGC (Minimum Standards and Procedure for Award of M.PHIL./PH.D Degrees) Regulations, 2016
- Branches: N/A

Collection
- Items collected: Theses and dissertations from 873 universities of India
- Size: 678981 full-text thesis &; 19086 synopses as of June 2026

Access and use
- Access requirements: Free digital access, online and downloadable

Other information
- Director: Prof. Devika P. Madalli; Manoj Kumar K, Scientist-F (CS)
- Parent organisation: INFLIBNET Centre, University Grants Commission (UGC), Ministry of Education, Government of India
- Website: shodhganga.inflibnet.ac.in

Shodhganga (Sanskrit: शोधगंगा; from Shodh, meaning research and discovery, and Ganga, the river) is a national open access digital repository of Electronic Theses and Dissertations (ETDs) submitted by research scholars to universities across India. It is maintained by the INFLIBNET Centre, an autonomous Inter-University Centre of the University Grants Commission (UGC) under the Ministry of Education, Government of India, headquartered at Gandhinagar, Gujarat. All submissions are freely accessible to the global scholarly community under the Creative Commons Attribution-NonCommercial-ShareAlike 4.0 International (CC BY-NC-SA 4.0) licence.

Shodhganga was established in 2010, following a UGC mandate issued in June 2009 requiring all Indian universities to submit electronic copies of PhD theses and MPhil dissertations to INFLIBNET for centralised hosting.

INFLIBNET Centre also maintains a companion repository, Shodhgangotri, which archives synopses and research proposals of PhD programmes in Indian universities.

== About ==
It is maintained by INFLIBNET Centre which is an autonomous Inter-University Centre of the University Grants Commission (UGC) of India. It was initially located in the campus of Gujarat University, Ahmedabad. As of January 2013, INFLIBNET Centre has moved to its new institutional building at infocity, Gandhinagar, capital of Gujarat. And the new Director of the INFLIBNET is Prof Devika P Madalli former professor of DRTC, ISI Banglore.

By December 2023, as many as 739 universities in India have signed MoUs with the INFLIBNET Centre to participate in the Shodhganga project. The full text of all the documents submitted to Shodhganga are available to read and to download in open access to the academic community worldwide. The repository has a collection of over 500,000 theses and 13000 synopses. The Shodhganga repository was created consequent on the University Grants Commission making it mandatory through regulations issued in June 2009 for all universities to submit soft copies of PhD theses and MPhil dissertations to the UGC for hosting in the INFLIBNET.

Those universities that have signed MoUs with INFLIBNET Centre are required to identify a senior academic to serve as a university coordinator to liaise with the university and the centre. Responsibilities of the coordinator include timely submission of soft copies of PhD theses submitted to the university to Shodhganga and to verify the correctness and completeness of these soft copies.

It has been observed that "online availability of electronic theses through centrally maintained digital repositories will not only ensure easy access and archiving of these but will also help in raising the quality and standard of research."

The INFLIBNET Centre is also maintaining another repository known by the name Shodhgangotri which is a repository of the synopses and research proposals of the PhD programmes in Indian universities. It has been described as a repository of the details of Indian Research in Progress.

== Technical platform ==
Shodhganga is built on DSpace, a free and open-source digital repository software developed by MIT Libraries and Hewlett-Packard.

== License ==
The submissions made to Shodhganga are made available under Creative Commons License Attribution-NonCommercial-ShareAlike 4.0 International (CC BY-NC-SA 4.0).
