= Coimbatore Institute of Technology =

Autonomous engineering college in Tamil Nadu, India

Coordinates: 11.028604°N 77.027225°E

- கோவை தொழில்நுட்பக் கல்லூரி
- Logo of CIT
- Motto: Nature in the service of man
- Type: Private (Government-Aided)
- Established: 1956; 70 years ago
- Academic affiliations: Anna University
- Chairman: S. Rajiv Rangasami
- President: K. Divya Mohana Rajiv
- Principal: A. Rajeswari
- Location: Avinashi Road, Coimbatore – 641 014., Tamil Nadu, India
- Campus: Urban
- Website: www.cit.edu.in

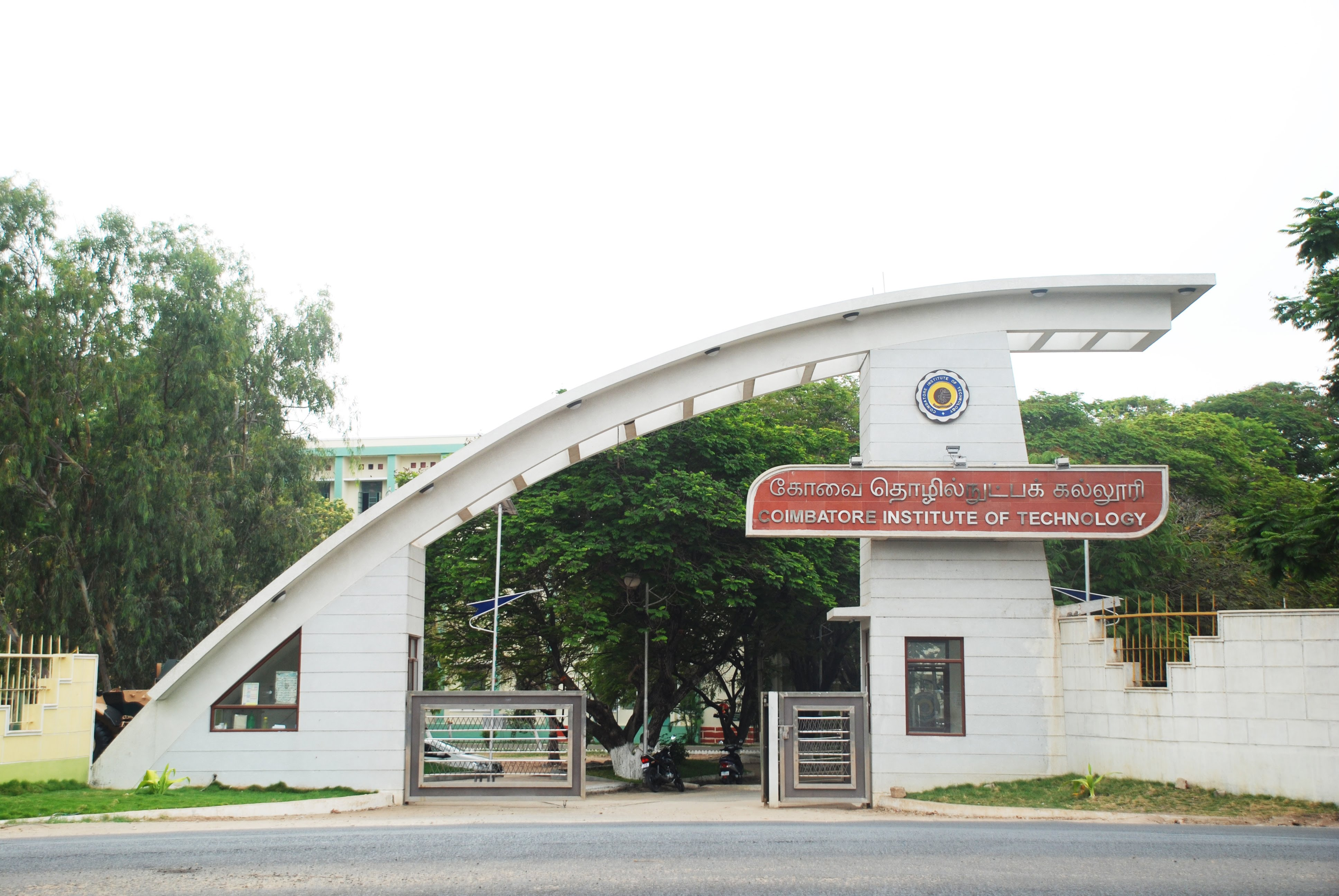
Entrance, Coimbatore Institute of Technology

Coimbatore Institute of Technology (CIT) is a government-aided autonomous engineering college located in Coimbatore, Tamil Nadu, India. It was founded in 1956 by V. Rangaswamy Naidu Educational Trust. It is affiliated to Anna University.

== History ==
Coimbatore Institute of Technology was founded in the year 1956 by V. Rangaswamy Naidu Educational Trust (VRET). Prof. R. Venkataswamy Naidu and Prof. P. R.Ramakrishnan are the Founders of Coimbatore Institute of Technology. Prof. R.Venkataswamy Naidu was the Founder Correspondent from 1956 to 1994. Prof. P. R. Ramakrishnan was the Principal from 1956 to 1981 and the Correspondent from 1994 to 2008.

CIT was affiliated to Madras University from 1956 to 1980. In 1980, the Institute became affiliated to Bharathiar University and subsequently to Anna University in 2001. CIT is recognized by the All India Council for Technical Education. The Institute was granted autonomous status in 1987 and is accredited by the National Board of Accreditation.

== Academics ==
CIT offers 9 Under Graduate Academic Programmes and 12 Post Graduate Academic Programmes in addition to M.S. and Ph.D. Research Programmes.

The CIT Sandwich Polytechnic College was inaugurated in 1961. Presently, 8 Engineering Diploma Programmes are offered by the polytechnic in various engineering disciplines. The National Board of Accreditation has accredited the Mechanical Engineering (Sandwich) and Mechanical Engineering diploma programmes.

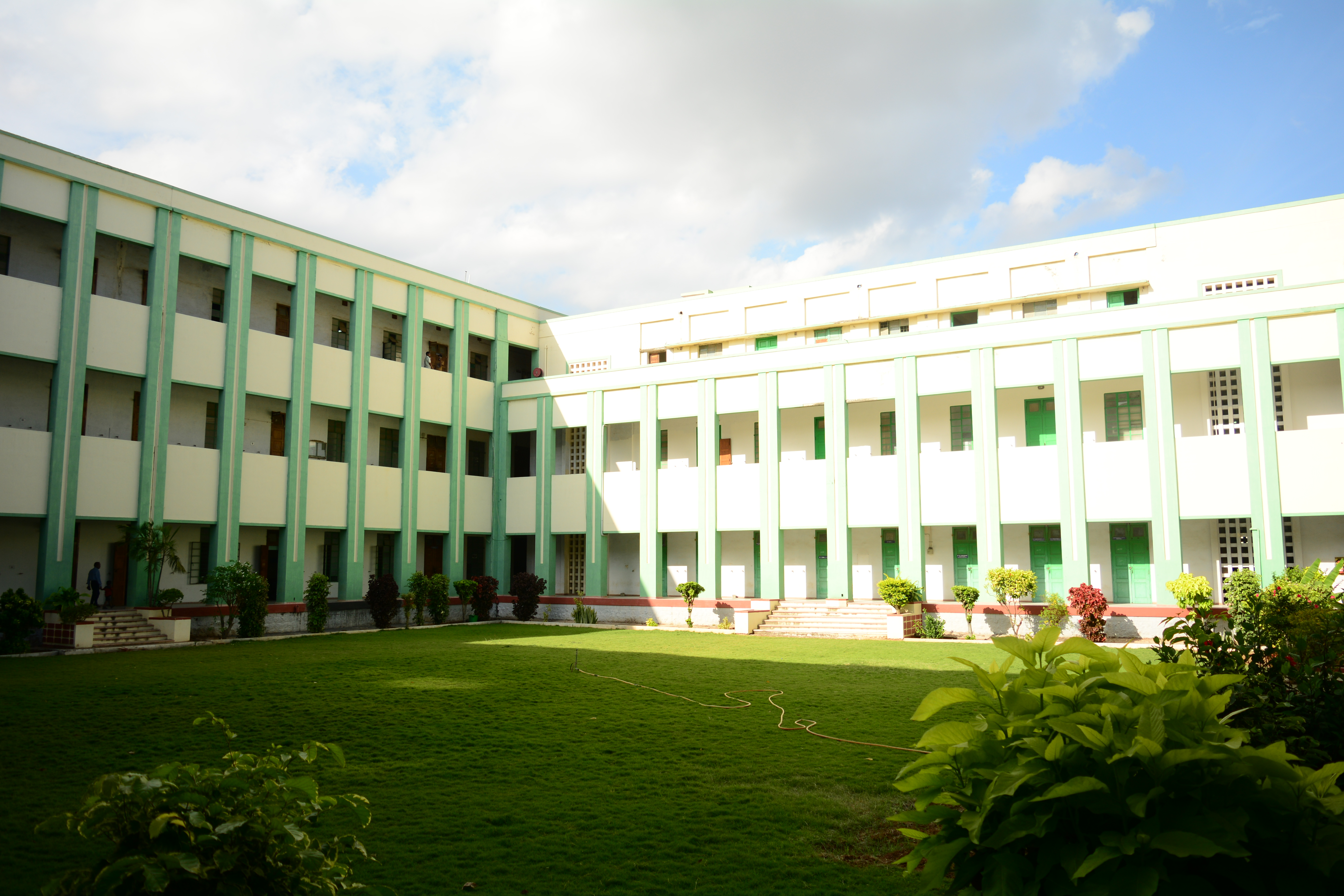
CIT Main building, Coimbatore Institute of Technology

=== Rankings ===
University and college rankings

Engineering – India
- NIRF (2024): 101-150

CIT is ranked 101-150 band in the National Institutional Ranking Framework (NIRF) engineering ranking of 2024.

== Student life ==
CIT cricket ground

=== Students Union ===
The students union consists of 20 clubs which include arts, dramatics, muthamizh mandram (Tamil), film, karate, literary, music, nature, photography, quiz, Kalam Knowledge Club (KKC), space, sports, NSS, NCC, YRC, RSP, Entrepreneurship development cell, Women Empowerment Cell, YHAI and Rotaract.

All the branches of engineering, technology, and applied sciences run associations which organize technical meetings and symposia in their respective disciplines.

The Coimbatore Regional Centre of the Indian Institute of Chemical Engineers functions with its office at the Department of Chemical Engineering in the Institute.

The Coimbatore centre of the Indian Welding Society (IWS) has been functioning in the Institute since 2002 in the department of Mechanical Engineering.

A student branch of IEEE functions with its office in the Department of Electrical and Electronics Engineering in the Institute.

The Institute has facilities for ball badminton, basketball, cricket, football, hockey, tennikoit, tennis, and volleyball.

=== Interface ===
Interface, an inter-collegiate technical symposium, is conducted by the circuit branches of Coimbatore Institute of Technology. Interface is held for two days in the month of February every year and invites the university students across the country, to showcase their projects, present research papers, network with other university students and participate in various events on campus. This symposium is organized entirely by students of various departments from fund raising for the events to event management.

=== Technovation ===
It is a national level technical symposium by the Chemical, Civil and Mechanical engineering students conducted during September every year.

=== Cyber Fest ===
It is a National Level Student Technical Symposium organized by Department of Computer Applications Association during January every year conducted By M.sc Software Engineering and M.C.A. Students.

== Notable alumni ==
- Akkineni Ramesh Prasad - 1960 BE Mechanical, director, Prasad Media Corporation, Hyderabad & Prasad Film Laboratories, Chennai
- R. Prabhu - 1968 BE Mechanical, former Union Minister of India
- Narayanaswamy Balakrishnan - 1972 BE ECE, Indian aerospace and computer scientist, associate director, Indian Institute of Science, Bangalore.
- Natarajan Chandrasekaran - 1976 BSc Applied Sciences, current chairman of Tata Sons.
- K. Krithivasan - 1985 Mechanical, Chief Executive Officer and Managing Director of Tata Consultancy Services.
- M. J. Xavier - 1976 BTech Chemical, founding director, Indian Institute of Management Ranchi
- Subbiah Arunan, Project Director of Mars Orbiter Mission
- VB Chandrasekar - 1986 BE Mechanical, former Indian cricket player
- Karthik Krishnan - 1995 BE Mechanical, Global CEO, Britannica Group.
- Venkat Panchapakesan - 1988 ECE - Senior Vice President, Engineering, YouTube & Google Inc.
- Er.Jahangir Mohammed - 1991, ECE, Founder and CEO of Jasper Technologies (part of Cisco USA.)
- S.P. Amrith I.A.S - 2005 BE ECE, District Collector, The Nilgiris (Nov 2021-Sep 2023).
