= Indian Council of Social Science Research =

Indian research institute for the social sciences

- Established: 1969; 57 years ago
- Location: Aruna Asaf Ali Marg, New Delhi
- Chairman: Deepak Kumar Srivastava
- Member Secretary: Dhananjay Singh
- Website: icssr.org

The Indian Council of Social Science Research (ICSSR) is the national body overseeing research in the social sciences in India. It was established in New Delhi in 1969.

== Council ==
The council is currently chaired by Prof. Deepak Kumar Srivastava. Current members include Deena Bandhu Pandey, P. Kanagasabapathi, Sanjay Kumar, H.S. Bedi, Harish Chandra Singh Rathore, Panchanan Mohanty, Amita Singh, Kshamadevi Shankarrao Khobragade, T. Subramanyam Naidu, Rakesh Sinha, Aswini Mohapatra, P.V. Krishna Bhatta, Santishree Dhulipudi Pandit, J.K. Bajaj, M.P. Bezbaruah, D.D. Pattanaik, and Madhu Purnima Kishwar.

== Activities ==
It provides funding to scholars and to a network of twenty-nine research institutes, among them:

- A.N. Sinha Institute of Social Studies, Patna (ANSISS Patna)
- Nabakrushna Choudhury Centre for Development Studies (NCDS), Bhubaneswar
- Institute of Economic Growth, Delhi
- Centre for Development Studies, Thiruvananthapuram
- Centre for Policy Research, New Delhi
- Centre for Studies in Social Sciences, Calcutta
- Centre for the Study of Developing Societies, Delhi
- Centre for Multi-Disciplinary Development Research
- Centre for Women's Development Studies, Delhi
- Govind Ballabh Pant Social Science Institute, Allahabad
- Indian Institute of Economics, Hyderabad
- Institute of Public Enterprise, Hyderabad
- Institute for Social and Economic Change, Bangalore
- Institute for Studies in Industrial Development, New Delhi
- Madras Institute of Development Studies.
- Omeo Kumar Das Institute of Social Change and Development, Guwahati
- Giri Institute of Development Studies, Lucknow

A large proportion of its budget is spent on its own administration; in 1996–1997, this amounted to 23% of total expenditure. It has been described as an "oversized, unimaginative and inefficient bureaucrac[y]".

== See also ==
- National Social Science Documentation Centre
