= Dipatoli =

Coordinates: 23.393°N 85.374°E

Dipatoli is the cantonment area of Ranchi. It is situated on NH33 that connects Hazaribagh to Jamshedpur via Ranchi. Most of the area of Dipatoli is occupied by Indian Army. It is the base to 23 Infantry. It is about 7 km from the centre of the city.

== Overview ==
The place is important as the gateway to the urban area of Ranchi. Many schools like Surendranath Centenary School, Kendriya Vidyalaya and Army School are situated in the boundaries of Dipatoli, along with Usha Martin Academy. The market of Booty More Chowk acts as the main market for the residents nearby.

In 2008, Jharkhand War Memorial, Dipatoli was also constructed to honour the men of Jharkhand who sacrificed their lives for their country. The Cantonment Area of Dipatoli has a large golf course, residence for armed force personnel as well as different army offices. Gymkhana Club is also situated in Dipatoli.
