= SAARC Documentation Centre =

Regional centre of SAARC located at New Delhi in India

SAARC Documentation Centre (SDC)
- Established: 1994
- Affiliations: SAARC
- Director: Dr. Gangan Prathap
- Location: New Delhi, India
- Website: www.sdc.gov.in

SAARC Documentation Centre (SDC) is a regional centre of SAARC (South Asian Association for Regional Cooperation). SDC is located in New Delhi. Presently it is housed on the campus of NISCAIR.

== SDC now closed ==
The 30-year-old South Asian grouping SAARC has closed down three of its regional centres in line with a decision taken at its 18th summit meeting at Kathmandu. The scrapped centres are the Saarc Information Centre in Kathmandu, Saarc Human Resource Development Centre in Islamabad, and Saarc Documentation Centre in New Delhi.

== Events held ==
1. 5-day Training Programme on Koha - Open Source Library Automation Software from 5th Dec. to 10th Dec. 2011 at New Delhi, India

2. 5-day SAARC Workshop on Library 2.0 from 12th Dec. to 16th Dec. 2011 at Kathmandu in Nepal

SDC organized SAARC Workshop 2011 on Library 2.0 in Kathmandu, Nepal during the period 12-16 Dec. 2011. There were 24 participants from various SAARC member states.
