= INFLIBNET Centre =

Education organization in Gandhinagar, India

Information and Library Network Centre
- 23°11′18″N 72°38′00″E
- Location: India
- Type: Repository, Networking Universities
- Established: March 1991; 35 years ago

Other information
- Website: www.inflibnet.ac.in

INFLIBNET Centre (Information and Library Network Centre) is an Inter-University Centre of the University Grants Commission (India) under the Ministry of Education (India). The organisation promotes and facilitates libraries and information resources for Indian further education. Its premises are in Gandhinagar, Gujarat.

Shodhganga, the digital repository of theses and dissertations submitted to universities in India is maintained by INFLIBNET Centre. INFLIBNET also performed an important role as an online learning resources by HRD Ministry during COVID-19 lockdown in India.

== History ==
INFLIBNET is a major National Programme initiated by the University Grants Commission (India) on 27th February, 1991 as a project under the Inter-University Centre for Astronomy and Astrophysics (IUCAA). It became an independent Inter-University Centre in June 1996. INFLIBNET runs a nationwide high speed data network connecting university libraries and other information centres.

INFLIBNET is involved in modernizing university libraries in India using the state-of-art technologies for the optimum utilisation of information. In 2022, University Grants Commission (India) launched an initiative with the Information and Library Network (INFLIBNET) Centre to assist research scholars and their supervisors in conducting their research.

== Activities ==
The Shodhganga portal of Inflibnet Centre displays the achievement of the competing universities with a detailed index of number of theses contributed by several departments of study. Calcutta University, Savitribai Phule Pune University and Aligarh Muslim University (AMU) have become largest contributors of theses to the Shodhganga portal of Inflibnet Centre.

== Publications ==
INFLIBNET publishes a quarterly newsletter and annual report which are distributed to the academic community across the country.

== See also ==
- National Library of India
- List of library and information schools in India
