= National Centre for Science Information =

Information centre of Indian Institute of Science in Bangalore, India

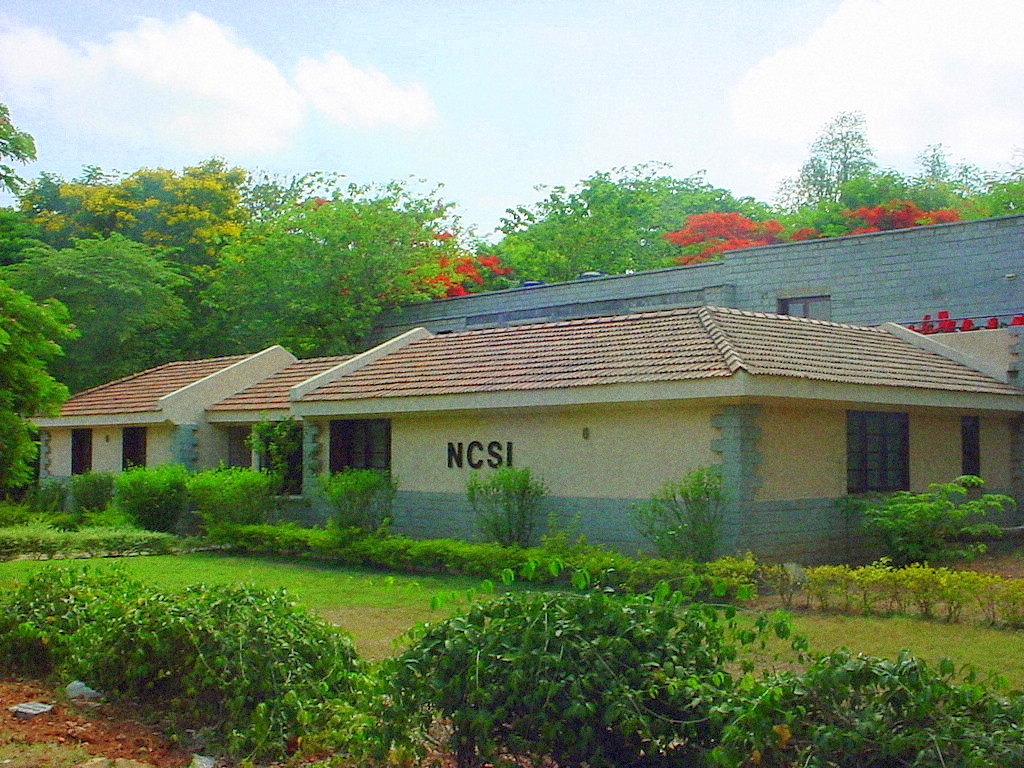
NCSI, IISc, Bangalore

National Centre for Science Information (NCSI) was the information centre of Indian Institute of Science, Bangalore, that provided electronic information services to the Institute academic community. The Centre also undertook sponsored R&D projects and conducted a training programme on Information and Knowledge Management. NCSI was established in 1983, as a University Grants Commission (India) Inter-University Centre (IUC). Formerly, as UGC-IUC for science information, NCSI provided national level current awareness services to researchers in Indian universities during 1984 to 2002.

== Information Services ==
NCSI provided variety of electronic information services to the IISc scholars. These include:

- Intranet and Internet access to world's leading bibliographic databases;
- Gateway services for electronic journals and open access resources on the Internet;
- Customized web access through MySciGate portal;
- Document delivery services.

=== SciGate: The IISc Science Information Portal ===
All the services provided by NCSI were integrated via the Scigate: The IISc Science Information Portal. SciGate was a science information portal and gateway website developed for the use of students, staff and faculty of IISc. SciGate provides single point access to a variety of locally hosted and Internet-based science, engineering, medicine and management information resources. Portion of content on SciGate (open sources, InfoWatch, IISc Publications) and E-JIS (free e-journals) are freely accessible on the Internet.

NCSI also published a monthly electronic newsletter InfoWatch reporting new Internet resources of relevance to Science and Technology researchers.

Other services initiated and maintained by NCSI include

- ePrints@IISc (Open Access Repository of IISc Research Publications)
- etd@IISc (Electronic Theses and Dissertations of IISc)
- e-JIS (Electronic Journal Information Service)

== Training Programme on Information and Knowledge Management ==
NCSI conducted a one-and-a-half year postgraduate training programme on Information and Knowledge Management. The selected candidates were imparted knowledge and skills in setting up and managing e-information services, digital libraries, and knowledge management solutions. The 18 months programme included course work, assignments, lab work, seminars, and an eight months project.

== Project ==
NCSI carried out a project named Scientific Journal Publishing in India (SJPI) which was sponsored by the Asian Media Information and Communication Centre (AMIC) and the Pan Asia ICT Grants Program (based in Singapore) of the International Development Research Centre (IDRC). The project was carried out from October 2004 to March 2007. The Public Knowledge Project (PKP), headed by John Willinsky, partnered in SJPI. Open Journal Systems and Open Archives Harvester developed by PKP were used to automate the journal publishing. The journals of Indian Academy of Sciences were used in the project of which only Current Science uses OJS for the publication process now.

== LIS-Forum ==
NCSI also operated a moderated, free discussion forum (List service) LIS-Forum for library & information professionals. Currently it is operated and maintained by JRD Tata Memorial Library, Indian Institute of Science, Bangalore and NCSI-Net Foundation.

== KM-Forum ==
This was another global discussion forum maintained by NCSI for Knowledge Management (KM). It is a platform for knowledge management professionals to discuss all KM related topics.

== NCSI-Net ==
NCSI-Net is a group of all NCSI staff and alumni formed for the professional development of its members. One of the major event conducted by NCSI-Net is Dr. T B Rajashekar (TBR) Memorial annual seminar and lecture series.
