= Indian Library Association =

Indian professional association

- 28.55595901546893°N 77.24919111833167°E
- Location: Delhi, India
- Established: September 13, 1933

Other information
- Website: https://ilaindia.co.in/

The Indian Library Association (ILA) was established on September 13, 1933 Registered under the societies Registration Act (XXI of 1860), on the occasion of the First All India Library Conference held at Calcutta (now Kolkata). The headquarters of ILA situated in Delhi, India.

== Objectives ==
The main objectives of the association are:

- Promoting library movement in the country
- Developing Library and Information Science education
- Training and research, betterment of library personnel
- Cooperation at the national and international levels
- Promotion of standards, norms, services and guidelines
- Providing a forum for professionals and publication of materials
- Establishment of libraries, documentation centres and assistance to their establishment and working
- Promotion of appropriate library legislation in India

== Conferences ==
Its 53rd Annual conference was held in Hyderabad in 2007. Its 54th Annual conference was held in Mumbai in 2008. Its 55th Annual conference was held at Birla Institute of Management Technology, Greater Noida from 21–24 January 2010 India. 63rd Annual Conference was held at Babasaheb Bhimrao Ambedkar University, Lucknow from 23–25 November 2017 on the topic "Sustainable Development of Library and Information Science Profession".This was an international conference organised by Department of LIS and Gautam Buddha Central Library of Babasaheb Bhimrao Ambedkar University Lucknow.

== Ex-ILA Presidents ==
- Prof. Mohan Rambhau (2022-2025)
- Prof. B.D.Kumbhar (2019-2022)
- Prof. Shabahat Husain (2016-2019)
- Prof. (Mrs) Ashu Shokeen (2013-2016)
- Dr. D V Singh (2010-2013)
- Dr. Kautilya Shukla (2007-2010)
- Dr. M Koganuramath (16-05-2004-2007)
- Dr. Pandey S K Sharma (01-04-2004-15-05-2004)
- Dr. C R Karisiddappa (2002-2004)
- Smt. Kalpana Das Gupta (2000-2002)
- Prof. J L Sardana (1998-2000)
- Prof. P N Kaula (1996-1998)
- Dr. P S G Kumar (1994-1996)
- Mr. C P Vashishta (1992-1994)
- Mr. S C Biswas (1990-1992)
- Prof. Krishan Kumar (1988-1990)
- Mr. T S Rajgopalan (1985-1988)
- Mr. Girja Kumar (1983-1985)
- Prof. P B Mangla (1981-1983)
- Mr. B L Bhardwaj (1978-1981)
- Mr. D R Kalia (1975-1978)
- Prof. S Bashiruddin (1972-1975)
- Prof. B V R Rao (1968-1972)
- Dr Sohan Singh (1966-1968)
- Dr. P N Gaur (1964-1966)
- Prof. Nihar Ranjan Ray (1960-1964)
- Prof. B S Kesavan (1953-1960)
- Prof. S R Ranganathan (1944-1953)
- Mr. John Sargent (1940-1944)
- Dr. Wali Mohmmed (1937-1940)
- Dr. M OThomas (1933-1937)

== Publications ==
The Journal of Indian Library Association is a flagship journal of ILA since 1965. The journal is issued as a quarterly publication and is peer-reviewed.
