= Bloustein =

Bloustein is a surname. Notable people with the surname include:

- Edward J. Bloustein (1925–1989), American law professor and university president
- Francis J. Bloustein (1906–1984), American judge

== See also ==
- Edward J. Bloustein School of Planning and Public Policy
- Edward J. Bloustein Distinguished Scholar
- Blaustein (surname), another surname
- Dorothea Blostein, Canadian computer scientist
- Paul Blustein, American economic journalist and author
