= Gail Thain Parker =

American academic and educational reformer

6th president of Bennington College
- In office 1971–1976
- Preceded by: Edward J. Bloustein
- Succeeded by: Joseph S. Iseman (interim)

Personal details
- Born: February 8, 1943 (age 83)
- Education: Radcliffe College (B.A.); Harvard University (Ph.D)

Gail Thain Parker (born February 8, 1943, Chicago) is an American scholar of American literature, women's studies, author, and educational reformer. She is known for being the president of Bennington College from 1972 to 1976 and for controversies over educational reform.

== Early life and education ==
Parker was born in Chicago to Richard and Jane Noyes Thain, but grew up in Evanston, Illinois. Her father was a journalist, professor of marketing, and later taught at the University of Chicago. He published studies of race relations in Evanston and books on management and job counseling. She graduated from Evanston Township High School in 1960. She later recalled that in her high-school commencement speech she attacked "specific examples of racism" in which a white classmate was ostracized for having a black friend. She graduated from Radcliffe College in 1964 and went on to a PhD at Harvard. She then became an assistant professor of history and literature, one of the youngest tenured members of the Harvard faculty.

She married Thomas David Parker, June 9, 1964. They had a daughter, Julia Parker, born in 1967, and divorced, 1978. She later married Paul Wickes, a lawyer.

== Women's studies and American studies ==
Parker's first book, Mind Cure in New England: From the Civil War to World War I (1973), a group study of men and women who pursued psychological health practices, she described as "an essay in interpretation, rather than a full-scale study". (xi) Lawrence Buell, reviewing it in The New England Quarterly, called the book's attitudes toward these reformers "sympathetic yet critical". He found the discussions "at their best" to be "crisp and insightful", but "not entirely successful", since the analysis tended to "dissolve into anecdote". Her argument, however, was both "provocative and persuasive", different from earlier scholars who saw the movement as "essentially defensive retreat from practical realities". She saw the movement "in terms of an unresolved conflict between the desire for spiritual solace and the desire for a productive and successful life as the world measures it."

The Oven Birds: American Women on Womanhood (1974), her anthology of women's writings, used Women's Studies as an interdisciplinary approach. A review-of-the-field article welcomed it for using tools of both history and literary analysis.

== Bennington College presidency ==
In 1972, after an extended search and discussion, the Board of Bennington College invited Parker to become president. Her husband, Thomas Parker, who had been senior tutor at a Harvard undergraduate House, was named vice president in charge of finance and administration. The New York Times reported that at the age of 29 she was the youngest college president in the country, which drew national curiosity. When a reporter asked whether her husband minded that she had a higher rank, she remarked "it's not everyone who gets to sleep with the president."

Bennington, founded in 1932 as a women's college, was known, and sometimes criticized, as a free-spirited and innovative place with nationally respected faculty, especially in its arts and writing programs, and affluent students. The college did not have required courses, majors, a college song, social clubs, or college sports. In the 1960s the board became concerned over financial problems, national unrest over race and gender, and changing student interests, and in 1969 decided to admit men.

Admitting men increased the size of the student body and pressure on faculty resources, and plans for major new construction created the need to borrow money at a time when interest rates were high and energy costs were rising. The new president thus faced a budget shortfall, demands for affirmative action and racial inclusion, maintaining or restoring academic standards, and construction of the college's Visual and Performing Arts (VAPA) buildings. The Parkers, as young and innovative, were expected to deal with these challenges.

=== Affirmative action and the Black Studies Project ===
Parker's first concern was affirmative action to increase minority representation both in the student body and the staff and to hire more women. Her letter to the community of October 1973 warned that an Affirmative Action Program "in a narrowly compensatory spirit will surely fulfill the dire prophecies of those who fear quotas and reverse discrimination." In contrast, she continued, the plan she proposed was "one way of bringing the College closer to realizing its longstanding ideals of excellence, among them the ideal of an excellent diversity."

Some faculty objected. One wrote directly to the board that the college "had always taken affirmative action with respect to bringing members of minority groups to the College, whether as students, as faculty members, or as members of the administration and staff". The letter pointed to the record of Black faculty and administrators, and concluded that "Bennington does not need to defend its past record and recently arrived members of its administration and faculty who clamor against its practices prove only their common ignorance of the principles on which the College has always conducted itself." The proposed requirement that the faculty be fifty percent women "ignores the fact that number of available women candidates for any given position, no matter what their quality, is unlikely to equal the number of available men candidates of the same quality."

Parker replied to this and other criticisms that "we cannot discriminate against white males any more than we can discriminate against black women. In the case of faculty hiring, we must be sure that we actively recruit a diverse group of candidates because it is only in this way that we can have any hope of increasing the number of women and minorities on the faculty". "Nevertheless", she concluded, "to set goals is not to set quotas ... and to say that this College would do well to try each year to increase the proportion of women and minority faculty members does not strike me as inherently political or vilely tendentious."

In September 1973, the college announced a Black Studies Project.

=== Report on Future Directions ===
In early 1975, the board created the Ad Hoc Committee on Future Directions. Parker headed the committee and appointed one full‐time and two part‐time faculty and former and present trustees, including Dr. Frederick Burkhardt, president emeritus of the American Council of Learned Societies and former president of Bennington. After six months, their Report recommended a major reorganization of the college, including reduction in the size of the faculty and consolidating the college's eight divisions into five. Students would no longer simply choose courses, but be required to major in two subjects. The Report also recommended the elimination of the unwritten but generally followed practice of "presumptive tenure". Instead, faculty would be offered a succession of limited term contracts, with review, and the expectation that tenure would be offered to at most a quarter of the faculty. A dozen of the 73 full-time faculty positions would be cut and the number of assistantships reduced. Tuition was to rise.

Faculty and student reaction was immediate and negative. The faculty voted "no confidence" almost unanimously and students voted support for the faculty 179 to 13. Parker told a New York Times reporter that "when people are angry or upset they tend to want to find someone to blame it on", but students and faculty said that their disagreement was not with the recommendations but that the president had withdrawn from them and that their concern was procedural: the meetings of the committee were secret, no students were on the committee, and there was no general discussion before the board expressed approval.

=== Vote of "no confidence" and resignation ===
Some trustees suggested compromise, but in February 1976, Parker and her husband resigned. They issued a statement: "a number of trustees have begun to feel that the heat in the kitchen threatens to set the whole house on fire." Their statement added that "Unfortunately, in now suggesting substantial compromise after having encouraged us all year to stand firm, the trustees have inadvertently made it impossible for us to function effectively in our current positions." One faculty member described the Parkers as "ambitious and cynical, and lacking cool", and said their resignation statement appeared "resentful". The board appointed Joseph S. Iseman, a New York lawyer, acting president. Iseman agreed with Parker's analysis, calling it a "sad and tragic business". "Everything Gail and Tom did they did because the board asked them to", he said, but "when the chips were down, it became difficult for the trustees to support them."

Some of the criticism was personal. There was much comment on an open relationship she had with a member of the faculty. In 1978 Parker told a New York Times reporter that "there have been men in the same situation, but nothing was said about them", but she did not feel bitter feeling about the media or Bennington. She laughed when asked about reports that she had served "bad lasagna at faculty meetings". Parker also later told a reporter that she was forced out for expressing what were construed to be radical, unpalatable ideas. She said that she was "still rebellious, in the sense that there are certain people that I wouldn't sit down in a room and deal with at all."

In September 1976, Nora Ephron published an article in Esquire magazine that was widely read. She wrote that "twenty years ago a woman who became powerful was probably a powerful woman. Today she may just be in the right place at the right time." Ephron wrote that a tense situation in the late 1960s led the board to seek out a president who was young. She felt the Parkers were naive in thinking that they could fit into the college's culture and that Parker was "almost recklessly candid about herself ... as if she had been encouraged in a kind of egotism and could not stop talking about herself".

Ephron reported in detail on alleged sexual relations with a faculty member. For months after the Parkers arrived, the faculty member was vicious to the Parkers and promoted a rival reform plan that he said would make the curriculum more structured but encourage students to operate inventively on their own. Ephron claimed that after a time the relation with faculty member turned openly sexual.

The Parkers' departure left some members of the board of trustees feeling that the faculty had acted in an arrogant way, especially members of the Division of Literature and Languages. The bad feeling, according to an investigation by the American Association of University Professors, lingered, and was a factor in the "cataclysmic upheaval" of 1994 in which the board gave notice to a large number of faculty that their services were terminated and carried out fundamental restructuring.

== Further career and educational reform ==
After leaving Bennington, Parker continued to work on reform in American higher education and continued to talk to the national press. In the fall of 1976, she became a part-time faculty advisor at Drew University, Madison, New Jersey. She commented to a New York Times reporter that mood on Drew's campus was "calm" and "reflective", undergoing "an era of good feeling" and that such subjects as tenure were under free discussion. She served for a time as a lobbyist for Vermont Association for Retarded Citizens.

In 1978, she and Thomas divorced.

Her book 1978 book, College on Your Own advised students that they did not have to attend a formal college to be successful and advised on alternatives. She included a collection of advice from scholars in a variety of academic fields on what students should read if they did not choose to go on to college.

The Writing on The Wall: Inside Higher Education In America (1979) was a full-length book on the failings of American higher education. She explained to a reporter who asked about the book that there is a "certain immorality about the way higher education plays on the feelings of people who are told that they can't accomplish anything without a degree. ... I'm talking about truth in advertising." The New York Times Book Review said that the book "concludes that higher education has gone belly up" and takes on everything: "college degrees don't mean anything, the curriculums bears little relationship either to the job market or to genuine education; professors and administrators spend all their time wrangling over diminishing power." She says that her ideal was that "colleges exist to help souls, not to decorate people with diplomas." Parker wants to abolish tenure and the bachelor's degree. She argues there ought to be some colleges that are communities of intellectuals not just academics, but writers and artists and other people who use their minds. Her proposal to do away with tenure, the review continued, does not address the issue of academic freedom, quoting the book that a "university teaching position should be an honor, to be enjoyed intermittently as a reward for proven accomplishment."

For 20 years she was an executive for the stock brokerage firm PaineWebber.

== See also ==
- Robert W. Fuller - Appointed President of Oberlin College at 33

== Selected publications ==
=== Books ===
- Parker, Gail Thain, ed. (1972). The Oven Birds: American Women on Womanhood, 1820-1920. Garden City: Anchor Books.
- ——— Mind Cure In New England: From The Civil War To World War I (Hanover, N.H., University Press of New England, 1973)
- ——— with Gene R Hawes, College On Your Own: How You Can Get a College Education at Home (New York: Bantam Books, 1978 ISBN 0553010921).
- ——— The Writing on The Wall: Inside Higher Education In America (New York: Simon and Schuster, 1979 ISBN 0671229222).

=== Articles ===
- "Jonathan Edwards and melancholy". The New England Quarterly (1968): 193-212.
- "Sex, sentiment, and Oliver Wendell Holmes". Women's Studies: An Interdisciplinary Journal 1.1 (1972): 47-63.
- "How to Win Friends and Influence People: Dale Carnegie and the Problem of Sincerity". American Quarterly 29, no. 5 (1977): 506–18. doi:10.2307/2712571.
- "Mary Baker Eddy and Sentimental Womanhood". The New England Quarterly 43: 1 (Mar. 1970)
- "While Alma Mater Burns", The Atlantic Monthly, 238 (3), September 1976

=== Policy documents ===
All available online at Bennington College Digital Repository.

- Bennington College (October 1973), Equal Opportunity Policy Affirmative Action Program (PDF)
- Bennington College (November 1975), Report of the ad hoc Committee on Future Directions (PDF)
- Black Studies Project. A group of 174 letters, clippings, minutes, and documents, mainly 1969–1979.
