= Carma Leigh =

American librarian (1904–2009)

- Leigh, from a 1960 publication
- Born: Carma Alice Russell; November 15, 1904; McLoud, Oklahoma Territory
- Died: September 25, 2009 (aged 104); La Mesa, California
- Other names: Carma Russell Zimmerman, Carma Russell Leigh, Carma Zimmerman Leigh
- Citizenship: United States
- Education: University of California, Berkeley
- Honours: California Library Hall of Fame (inducted 2012)

Carma Leigh (November 15, 1904 – September 25, 2009), born Carma Russell, was an American librarian. She was the State Librarian of California from 1951 to 1972.

== Early life and education ==
Carma Alice Russell was born near McLoud in Oklahoma Territory, the daughter of William Luther Russell and Ida Jenkins Russell, white homesteaders. She earned a bachelor's degree in history from the Oklahoma College for Women in 1925. She earned a master's degree in history and graduated from the School of Librarianship at the University of California, Berkeley in 1930.

== Career ==
Leigh began her career in the year 1930 as a junior assistant at the Berkeley Public Library. From 1932 to 1938, she was the city library director in Watsonville, California, where she knew John Steinbeck's sister Esther, and heard her apologize over some scenes in his novel, The Grapes of Wrath.

She served as county library director in Orange County from 1938 to 1942, and in San Bernardino County from 1942 to 1945.

In 1945, she left California to become Washington State Librarian.

In 1951, governor Earl Warren appointed Leigh to the position of State Librarian of California, a position she held through three more governors' terms, until her retirement in 1972.

During her term as State Librarian, the California Library Commission was established, and the Public Library Development Act passed into law in 1963, establishing state funding for a network of regional library systems. "Without strongly organized county, regional, or inter-county libraries", asked Leigh, "can there be a system of cooperative library services which will achieve many of the same advantages?"

In 1970 she lobbied to preserve book and library postal rates, a particular concern for librarians in larger Western states. When Leigh started as State Librarian of California in 1951, there was little coordination between different library locations and library systems within the state of California. However, by the time she retired in 1972, twenty-one cooperative library systems had been successfully implemented. Carma was able to achieve this through various methods, one of the most successful being her decision to a weeklong workshop where librarians from around the state could meet and begin creating "good, well-defined basic standards." Following this first workshop, the "Standards for Public Library Service in California," as they came to be called, were officially adopted by the CLA membership in November 1953.

She was president of the California Library Association and the Pacific Northwest Library Association.

She served on the executive board of the American Library Association. Beyond the state level, Leigh lobbied and testified for the federal Library Services Act, passed by Congress in 1956, and its successor the Library Services and Construction Act, passed in 1964.

In the early 1950s, she went to West Germany as part of the American Library Association's efforts to assist post-war rebuilding, and she was a member of the Defense Advisory Committee on Women in the Services.

Leigh was editor of the Washington State Library News Bulletin from 1945 to 1951, and had her own newsletter, From the California State Librarian, from 1951 to 1972.

In 1966 she presented a paper, "The Role of the American Library Association in Federal Legislation for Libraries", at the Allerton Park Institute, conducted by the University of Illinois Graduate School of Library Science.

In the early 1990s, she served on the California State Library Networking Task Force.

== Honors and awards ==
On the occasion of her retirement, a resolution commending her work was read in the state senate. In 1925, she was voted "Most Popular Girl" at the Oklahoma College for Women's, the same year she graduated with her B.A. in history. In 1973, she was named to the University of Science and Arts of Oklahoma Alumni Hall of Fame. In 1995, the California Library Association honored her as its longest-active member. She was honored in 1996 by the American Library Association as a "Legislative and Grass Roots Champion". She also held an honorary doctorate from the University of the Pacific.

== Personal life and legacy ==
Carma Russell was married twice. She divorced her first husband, Ernest Zimmerman, in 1938. Her second husband was political scientist, former Bennington College president and dean of the Columbia University School of Library Service, Robert Devore Leigh. They married in 1960; he died in 1961. She had a daughter, Rita Zimmerman Collier. Carma Leigh died in 2009, aged 104 years, in LaMesa, California. Her papers are archived in the California State Library.
