= Mason Welch Gross =

American academic

16th President of Rutgers University
- In office 1959–1971
- Preceded by: Lewis Webster Jones
- Succeeded by: Edward Bloustein

Personal details
- Born: June 03, 1911 Hartford, Connecticut, U.S.
- Died: October 11, 1977 (aged 66) Riverview Hospital; Red Bank, New Jersey, U.S.
- Spouse: Julia Kernan
- Children: Ellen Clarissa Gross; Katharine Wood Gross; Charles Welles Gross; Thomas Welch Gross
- Parent(s): Hilda Frances Welch (c1880-1962); Charles Welles Gross (1877-1957)
- Education: Jesus College, Cambridge; Harvard University

Mason Welch Gross (June 3, 1911 – October 11, 1977) was an American television quiz show personality, philosopher and academic. The namesake of Mason Gross School of the Arts, he served as the sixteenth President of Rutgers University from 1959 to 1971.

== Biography ==
He was born in Hartford, Connecticut in 1911 to Hilda Frances Welch (c. 1880-1962) and Charles Welles Gross (1877–1957). He had two siblings: Spencer Gross (1906–1982) and Cornelia Gross (1914-?). Charles Gross was an attorney. Mason started in the Hartford public grade school system and two years at Hartford High School. He then entered the Taft School, a preparatory school in Watertown, Connecticut in 1925. In 1927 he became ill following his inoculation for scarlet fever. He missed a year of school and spent part of the year at a ranch belonging to his mother's cousin in Arizona.

Mason earned his Bachelor of Arts in 1934; and Master of Arts degree in classics in 1937, at Jesus College, University of Cambridge. While there he rowed under the legendary Steve Fairbairn.

He returned to the United States and studied at Harvard University under Alfred North Whitehead, earning his PhD in 1938. He taught at Columbia University from 1938 to 1942, where he met Julia Kernan, a Vassar graduate, and they married on September 6, 1940. They had four children together: Ellen Clarissa Gross who married Frank A. Miles, Katharine Wood Gross who married Clayton H. Farnham, Charles Welles Gross, and Thomas Welch Gross.

He then served in World War II in the Army Intelligence Corps, and was assigned to a bomber group based in Italy. Gross earned the Bronze Star, and was later discharged as a Captain.

He then became Assistant Professor of Philosophy and Assistant to the Dean of Arts and Science at Rutgers University in 1946. In 1947 he was promoted to assistant dean and associate professor, and in 1949 was appointed to the newly created position of provost to take over the duties of the ailing Robert Clarkson Clothier who took a leave of absence. Clothier resigned his office in 1951 and Gross continued as provost under the newly appointed Lewis Webster Jones. He was then given the additional title of vice president in 1958. Jones resigned the presidency in August 1958, and in February 1959, Gross was chosen as president. On May 6, 1959, he became the sixteenth president of Rutgers University.

From 1949 to 1950 he was a panelist on the television quiz show, Think Fast. He was also a judge for the show, Two for the Money from 1952 to 1955.

He oversaw large-scale development on all the University's campuses, including the development of Livingston College from the Army's former Camp Kilmer. Gross served during turbulent times with student protests over the Vietnam War which saw the Rutgers ROTC building burned, and race riots in nearby Newark, New Jersey in 1967.

During this time, Gross received recognition for refusing to dismiss Eugene Genovese, a professor who early during the Vietnam War publicly supported the Viet Cong and welcomed their victory in Southeast Asia. During his tenure Rutgers University acquired the Center of Alcohol Studies in 1962, formerly housed at Yale University since the 1920s, and established a medical school.

In 1971, after 25 years of service, 12 as the university president, he retired. He then became the director of the Harry Frank Guggenheim Foundation and served until his death. At the time of his death, he was a resident of Rumson, New Jersey.

He died in Riverview Hospital in Red Bank, New Jersey, at age 66 in 1977.

== Legacy ==
The School for the Creative and Performing Arts at Rutgers was renamed as the Mason Gross School of the Arts in 1979 in his honor.

In 1980 Rutgers University Press published The Selected Speeches of Mason Welch Gross.
