= Bordentown Military Institute =

Private high school in New Jersey

The Bordentown Military Institute was a private high school in Bordentown, New Jersey, United States, from 1881 to 1973.

== History ==
The institute was created in 1881, when Reverend William Bowen purchased the Spring Villa Female Seminary building and reopened it as the Bordentown Military Institute. In 1972, it was merged with the Lenox School in Lenox, Massachusetts. The combined entity was shut down the following year as the Vietnam War reduced the popularity of a military education.

== Notable alumni ==
- John Atamian (1942-2024), Canadian Football League player
- Tim Berra (born 1951), wide receiver who played in the NFL for the Baltimore Colts
- Don Browne (1943–2023), media executive who was president of Telemundo following a tenure at NBC News
- Paul Boudreau (born 1949), NFL offensive line coach
- Paul Costa (1941-2015), AFL tight end for the Buffalo Bills
- Robert Duncan, first primate and archbishop of the Anglican Church in North America (born 1948)
- Joe Duckworth (1921-2007), football end who played in the NFL for the Washington Redskins
- Lee Elia, Major League Baseball manager for the Chicago Cubs and Philadelphia Phillies
- William C. Fels (1916-1964), president of Bennington College
- Ron Gassert (1940-2022), defensive tackle for the Green Bay Packers
- Vincent R. Kramer (1918–2001), United States Marine Corps colonel who was a guerrilla warfare expert and was awarded the Navy Cross during the Korean War
- Nicholas S. H. Krawciw (1935-2021), commanding general of the 3rd Infantry Division of the United States Army
- Floyd Little (born 1942), NFL Hall of Fame running back
- Tom Longo (1942-2015), NFL defensive back for the New York Giants and St. Louis Cardinals
- Douglas Palmer (born 1951), first African-American mayor of Trenton, New Jersey
- Barry T. Parker (born 1932), politician who served in both the New Jersey General Assembly and the New Jersey Senate
- Paul Pasqualoni (born 1949), former defensive coordinator for the Miami Dolphins, Detroit Lions and Dallas Cowboys
- Joe Plumeri (born 1943), Chairman & CEO of Willis Group Holdings, and owner of the Trenton Thunder
- Winston Prouty (1906-1971), United States Senator from Vermont
- Jack Robinson (1921-2000), professional baseball pitcher whose MLB career consisted of three games played for the Boston Red Sox in 1949
- Chris Short (1937-1991), Major League Baseball pitcher for the Philadelphia Phillies and Milwaukee Brewers
- Willard Dickerman Straight (1880–1918)
- Stan Walters (born 1948), former NFL offensive tackle
