= Iseman =

Iseman is a surname. Notable people with the surname include:

- Joseph S. Iseman (1916–2006), American lawyer and educator
- Madison Iseman (born 1997), American actress
- Matt Iseman (born 1971), American comedian, actor, and television host
- Vicki Iseman (born 1967), Washington, D.C.–based lobbyist
