= Bluvshtein =

Bluvstein is a Yiddish surname, the cognate of German Blaustein, literally "blue stone". Notable people with the surname include:

- Aleksandr Bluvshtein ru, Jewish Hero of the Soviet Union
- Mark Bluvshtein (born 1988), Soviet-born Jewish Canadian chess player

== See also ==
- Bluwstein
