= Laura Ruth Walker =

American education and media executive

Laura Walker
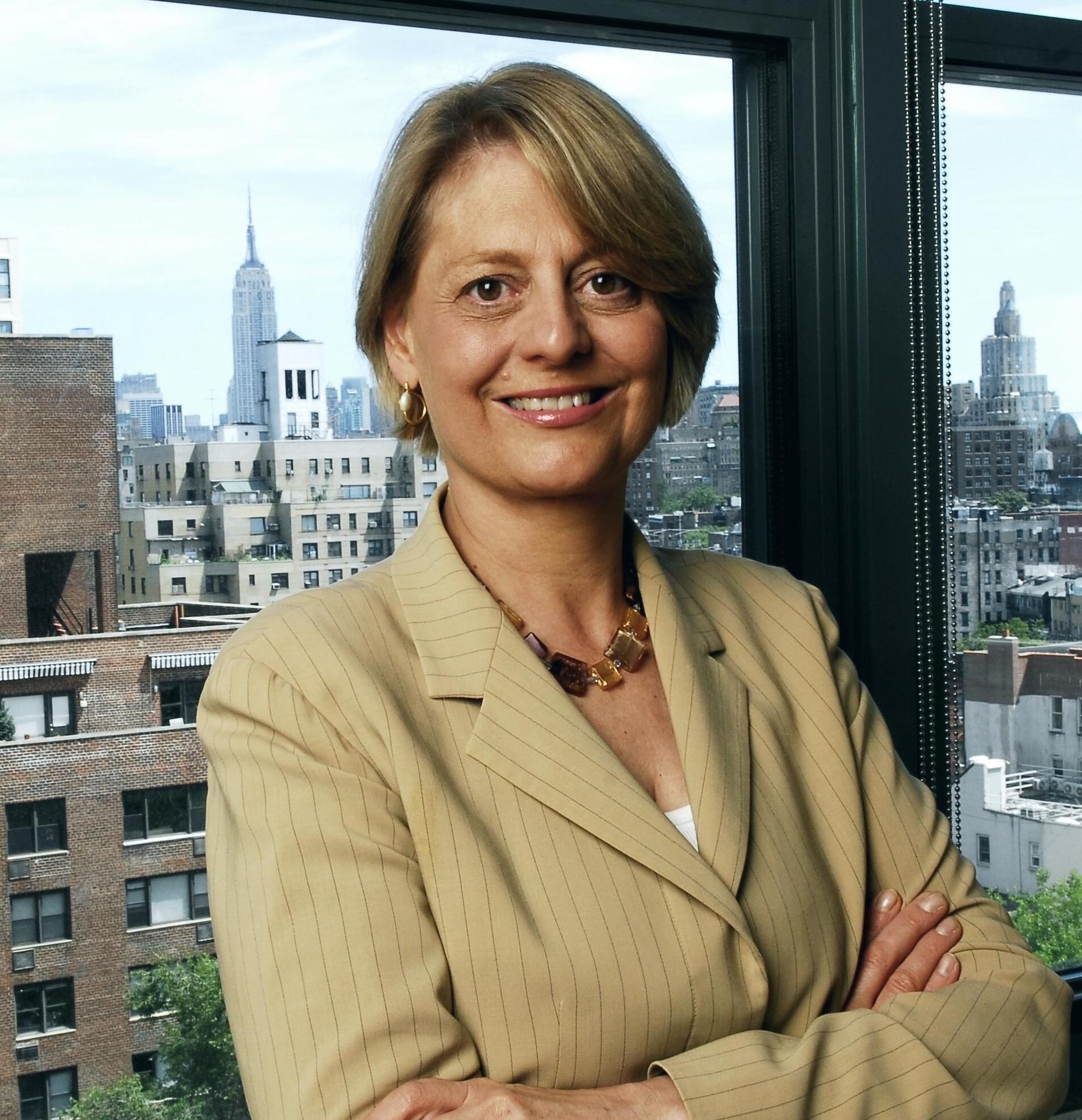
- Walker in 2008

11th President of Bennington College
- In office August 1, 2020 – December 31, 2025
- Preceded by: Mariko Silver
- Succeeded by: Elissa Tenny (Interim)

Personal details
- Born: Laura Ruth Walker; November 19, 1957 (age 68)
- Spouse: Bert Wells
- Children: 2
- Education: Wesleyan University (BA); Yale University (MBA)

Laura Ruth Walker (born November 19, 1957) is an American executive and former President of Bennington College. From 1995 to 2019, Walker was President and CEO of New York Public Radio (NYPR), a nonprofit media organization that operates WNYC, WNYC Studios, classical WQXR-FM, the website Gothamist, New Jersey Public Radio, and The Jerome L. Greene Performance Space. The organization produces programs for local and national audiences. New York Public Radio received ten George Foster Peabody Awards and five Alfred I. duPont awards during her tenure.

== Early life and education ==
A native New Yorker, Walker grew up in Westchester County. She graduated with a BA in history, magna cum laude, from Wesleyan University and earned an MBA from the Yale School of Management in 1987.

== Career ==
Walker began her professional career as a print journalist and then as a producer at National Public Radio. One of her NPR shows, The Sunday Show, won a Peabody Award. In 1983 she joined the staff of Carnegie Hall, where she launched AT&T Presents Carnegie Hall Tonight. After she received her MBA, she joined Sesame Workshop (formerly Children’s Television Workshop) in 1987, where for eight years she was the Vice President of Development and led the organization’s efforts to establish a cable television channel (now Noggin).

Walker joined WNYC in 1995 to oversee its transformation from a city-owned agency into an independent nonprofit. Her first challenge was to raise the $20 million necessary to purchase WNYC’s licenses from the City of New York and to build its production capacity. Walker oversaw New York Public Radio’s subsequent $62.9 million capital campaign to finance its new headquarters on Varick Street in New York and to fund programming initiatives. The new headquarters includes The Jerome L. Greene Performance Space, a street-level, multiplatform broadcast studio and performance venue. In 2009, NYPR acquired the classical music station WQXR from The New York Times Company and, in 2018, it acquired Gothamist.

Walker’s 23-year tenure as president and CEO of NYPR was characterized by exponential growth in NYPR’s original programming, as well as the size of its audience and revenues. Over that period, NYPR’s monthly audience grew from one million to 26 million, and annual revenues increased from $8 million to $95 million. Walker initiated and nurtured innovative programming in the news, music, culture and talk categories, including audio collaborations with The New Yorker, ProPublica and the BBC. She transformed the local newsroom into one of the largest in the New York media market and established stable funding for other programming developed in-house at NYPR.

Walker was instrumental in expanding the world of podcasting, including creating NYPR’s renowned podcast division, WNYC Studios. She was also the founder of the all-women’s podcasting festival Werk It!, which was created to increase female representation in the burgeoning field.

In late 2017, charges of sexual harassment at NYPR came to light, with allegations leveled specifically against longtime host John Hockenberry, who had left the station earlier that year. An investigation by an independent law firm commissioned by the NYPR Board concluded that there was no evidence of “pervasive discrimination” and found that “harassment complaints were investigated when they reached senior management or Human Resources, and that senior management reacted promptly and strongly where violations were found.” The NYPR Board expressed its support for Walker and acknowledged her efforts to improve the organization’s policies and processes. Other WNYC personalities who faced accusations of inappropriate behavior at the time and lost their positions were hosts Jonathan Schwartz and Leonard Lopate.

In December, 2018, Walker announced that she would step down from her role at NYPR at the end of March, 2019. In April, she returned to her alma mater, the Yale School of Management, as an executive fellow. She advises media companies, foundations, and nonprofits, including Springboard Enterprises, the leading accelerator for women entrepreneurs.

On June 1, 2020, Walker was announced as the 11th president of Bennington College, in Bennington, Vermont. Walker retired from Bennington at the end of the fall semester in 2025.

== Awards and honors ==
In 2008, Walker was honored with an Edward R. Murrow Award from the Corporation for Public Broadcasting. In 2009, and again in 2017, she was named by Crain’s as one of New York City’s 50 Most Powerful Women. Most recently, in 2019, Walker received the Municipal Arts Society of New York’s Jacqueline Kennedy Onassis Medal for her impact on the quality of life in New York.

Walker sits on the board of The Commonwealth Fund and the Yale Center for Customer Insights. She previously served as the Chair of the Hudson Square Business Improvement District and of SRG (Station Resource Group), and as a member of the boards of Tribune Media, Saint Ann’s School, Public Radio International, and Education Development Center, as well as the digital advisory board of Cooper Hewitt.
