= Bluestein =

Bluestein is a surname. Notable people with the surname include:

- Abe Bluestein (1909–1997), American anarchist and editor
- Barbara Simons (née Bluestein, born 1941), American computer scientist
- Greg Bluestein (born 1982), American journalist
- Howard B. Bluestein, American research meteorologist
- Susan Bluestein (born 1946), American casting director

Fictional characters include:

- Suzanna Bluestein, in the Japanese anime Divergence Eve

== See also ==
- Bluestein's FFT algorithm
- Blaustein (surname)
