= Francis Leo Lawrence =

American academic and administrator

- Lawrence at the 2002 Rutgers Commencement

18th President of Rutgers University
- In office 1990–2002
- Preceded by: Edward J. Bloustein
- Succeeded by: Richard Levis McCormick

Personal details
- Born: August 25, 1937 Woonsocket, Rhode Island
- Died: April 16, 2013 (aged 75) Mount Laurel, New Jersey
- Education: Saint Louis University (1959); Tulane University (1962)
- Salary: $287,000

Francis Leo Lawrence (August 25, 1937 – April 16, 2013) was an American educator and scholar specializing in French literature and university administrator. A graduate of Saint Louis University and Tulane University, Lawrence taught at Tulane for over 30 years and held posts as academic vice president, provost, and dean of the graduate school before being appointed as the 18th president of Rutgers University (1990–2002).

During his career, Lawrence authored several books and articles on French classical drama and baroque poetry with a focus on the works of Molière. For his contributions to this field, Lawrence was awarded the honor of Chevalier dans L'Ordre des Palmes Académiques by the French government.

== Early years ==
Francis Leo Lawrence, “Fran”, as he was known by all, was born in 1937 in Woonsocket, Rhode Island, the fifth child and only son of Anthony and Eldora Lawrence. He attended Mount Saint Charles High School (now Mount Saint Charles Academy) where he played hockey and was a star pitcher on the baseball team. He was inducted into the Mount Saint Charles Hall of Fame in 2005. Lawrence earned his bachelor's degree from St. Louis University in French and Italian in 1959, where he met his future wife Mary Kay at the beginning of his freshman year. He was awarded an NDEA fellowship for graduate study and earned a Doctor of Philosophy (Ph.D.) degree in French classical literature from Tulane University in 1962.

He rose through Tulane University's academic and administrative ranks to full professor, chairman of the French and Italian department, Dean of Newcomb College, Dean of the Graduate School and chief academic officer/Provost. In 1990, he was appointed president of Rutgers, the state university of New Jersey. He was married to Mary Kathryn Long Lawrence. They have four children and thirteen grandchildren. Lawrence died peacefully following an illness on April 16, 2013, at his home in Mount Laurel, New Jersey, with his wife of 54 years, Mary Kay, by his side as well as his daughter, Naomi; he was 75 years old.

== Presidency of Rutgers ==
Among his many accomplishments as president of Rutgers included: a strategic plan to further excellence in learning, research, and service that built upon Rutgers' strengths and offered a new vision of the university; the first university-wide curriculum committee assembled in over two decades to evaluate Rutgers' general education curriculum and to make recommendations that would focus the curriculum on the beginning of the 21st Century; Learning Resource Centers on each campus to help students achieve their greatest potential, and Teaching Excellence Centers on each campus to assist faculty in their classroom work; the RUNet 2000 project, which realized the goal of a fully wired campus and transformed teaching, research, and outreach at Rutgers; Community service initiatives, including the Adult Lifelong Learning program, now known as the Osher Institute; programs in the arts, music, and theater such as the Mason Gross School of the Arts' Rutgers in New York series, which exposed Rutgers artists to one of the world's most important cultural environments; the hugely successful Rutgers Campaign: Creating the Future Today, which raised 75 percent of its goal within the first 42 months and would far surpass its goal, raising more than $600 million; Rutgers' evolution as a global force in education, with new connections in Namibia, South Africa, Hungary, Ireland, Poland, France, Italy, and the Netherlands.

In 2002, he announced his plan to return to academia, and became a Rutgers University Professor. While on the Rutgers faculty, he authored Leadership in Higher Education: Views from the Presidency, a collection of interviews with presidents and chancellors of leading universities. He was praised for energetic fundraising attempts, the appointment of several committees to address the decline of undergraduate education and the academic quality of incoming students, as well as the construction of new academic facilities for the Mason Gross School of the Arts, the Edward J. Bloustein School of Planning and Public Policy, and the Rutgers-Newark Center for Law and Justice. Dr. Lawrence was also credited with retaining some members of the distinguished faculty recruited by his predecessor Edward Bloustein, some of whom earned several prestigious awards (including the Pulitzer Prize, the National Medal of Science, the MacArthur Foundation "genius" prize, Guggenheim Fellowships, and Sloan Fellowships). Lawrence has served as President of the North American Society for French Seventeenth Century Literature, on editorial boards for several scholarly journals, as the board chair of a monograph series, on the New Jersey Commission on Higher Education, and on the boards of several national higher education organizations.

He retired from the office of president in 2002. As President Emeritus, he returned to teaching, with an appointment as University Professor at Rutgers.

== Controversy ==
Comments made in 1994, in which Lawrence urged that higher education should not be denied to disadvantaged students who might lack the "genetic, hereditary background" to perform well on standardized tests, were publicized in 1995. The comments led to calls demanding for his resignation, and student protests, including one that brought a televised basketball game to a halt as protesters staged a sit-in on the court. Lawrence repeatedly apologized for the comments which he said were a verbal slip that did not represent his views.

== Selected publications ==
- Molière, The Comedy of Unreason. Tulane Studies in Romance Languages and Literature, no. 2. New Orleans, 1968.
- The Influence of Rhetoric on Seventeenth Century French Literature. (Co-Editor) Papers on French Seventeenth Century Literature, no.3 Seattle, 1975.
- "Dom Juan and the Manifest God: Molière's Anti-Tragic Hero." PMLA 93, 1978.
- Visages de Molière. (Editor, Author) Oeuvres et Critiques V.1: Paris: Editions Jean-Michel Place, 1981.
- Actes de New Orleans. (Editor) Papers on French Seventeenth Century Literature/Biblio 17, Paris-Seattle-Tuebingen, 1982.
- Leadership in Higher Education: Views from the Presidency. Transaction Publishers, 2006.

Academic offices
Preceded by Edward J. Bloustein	President of Rutgers University; 1990–2002	Succeeded by Richard L. McCormick
