= Paul Boudreau =

American gridiron football coach (born 1949)

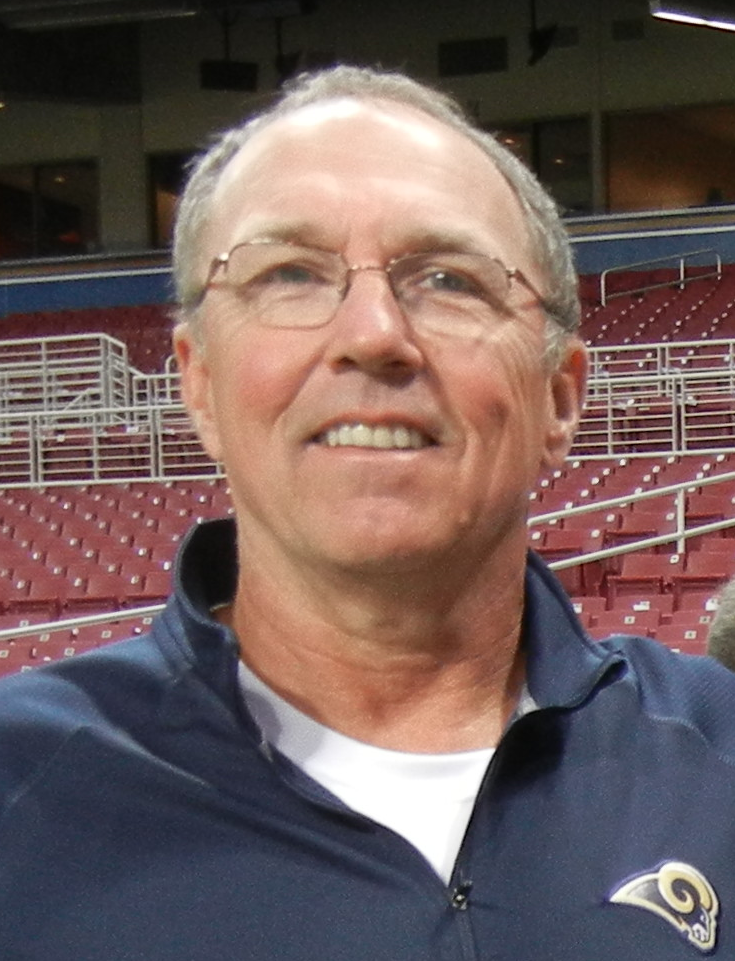
- Boudreau in 2014

Personal information
- Born: December 30, 1949 (age 76)

Career information
- High school: Bordentown Military
- College: Boston College

Career history
- Boston College (1974–1975) Offensive line coach; Maine (1976–1978) Offensive line coach; Dartmouth (1979–1981) Offensive line coach; Navy (1982) Offensive line coach; Edmonton Eskimos (1983–1986) Offensive line coach; New Orleans Saints (1987–1993) Offensive line coach; Detroit Lions (1994–1996) Offensive line coach; New England Patriots (1997–1998) Offensive line coach; Miami Dolphins (1999–2000) Offensive line coach; Carolina Panthers (2001–2002) Offensive line coach; Jacksonville Jaguars (2003–2005) Offensive line coach; St. Louis Rams (2006–2007) Offensive line coach; Atlanta Falcons (2008–2011) Offensive line coach; St. Louis/Los Angeles Rams (2012–2016) Offensive line coach

Paul T. Boudreau (born December 30, 1949) is an American football coach who last served as offensive line coach for the Los Angeles Rams of the National Football League (NFL). He has served as the offensive line coach for eight different NFL teams, one Canadian Football League (CFL) team, and four college teams. No offensive line coach in the NFL has more experience as an assistant at the professional level than Boudreau, who entered his 29th season in 2015. Boudreau's offensive lines over the years have blocked for five running backs who crossed the 10,000-yard career rushing mark, including Barry Sanders, Curtis Martin, Thurman Thomas, Fred Taylor, and Steven Jackson.

== Biography ==
=== Early life ===
Raised in Arlington, Massachusetts, Boudreau played offensive line at Arlington High School. Boudreau attended Bordentown Military Institute in Bordentown, New Jersey starting in 1967, where he played offensive guard and defensive tackle. He received All-Prep honors from the Newark Star Ledger for the 1968 season, and graduated in 1969. Boudreau was widely recruited, but returned to Massachusetts and played for Boston College under coach Joe Yukica as an offensive lineman from 1971 until his graduation in 1973.

=== Coaching career ===
Boudreau began his coaching career as an assistant at Oxford High School in Oxford, Massachusetts. He then joined his alma mater where he specialized as the offensive line coach from 1974–1975. He continued as the offensive line coach at other colleges including the University of Maine (1976–78), Dartmouth College (1979–81), and the United States Naval Academy (1982). He then joined the Edmonton Eskimos staff in the Canadian Football League and was the offensive line coordinator from 1983–1986.

Boudreau's first position in the NFL was with the New Orleans Saints. In his seven seasons with the Saints, his offensive line placed in the top three in fewest sacks allowed on four occasions. In 1992, the Saints allowed a league-low 15 sacks. He then joined the Detroit Lions, under head coach Wayne Fontes, where his offensive line helped Barry Sanders rush for over 1,500 yards each season, and almost 5,000 yards total over three seasons. In the 1997 and 1998 seasons, Boudreau coached the offensive line for the New England Patriots under head coach Pete Carroll.

Jimmy Johnson brought Boudreau to the Miami Dolphins for the 1999 season. Johnson eventually resigned in January 2000 and was replaced by assistant head coach and defensive coordinator Dave Wannstedt, but Boudreau remained on the staff. In July, at the age of 50, Boudreau took a short medical leave of absence for kidney surgery. When he returned for the 2000 season, his offensive line allowed only 28 sacks, the fourth best in the NFL.

In January 2001, Boudreau joined the Carolina Panthers, whose previous offensive line coach Tony Wise coincidentally accepted Boudreau's job in Miami. The Panthers had previously allowed a season high 69 sacks. For the 2001 season, Boudreau's offensive line set a club record of 31 sacks, which ranked 11th in the NFL, although the Panthers still finished with a 1–15 record. In 2002, the offensive line allowed 44 sacks, and the team finished 7–9.

When Panthers defensive coordinator Jack Del Rio became the head coach of the Jacksonville Jaguars, Boudreau followed and served as the offensive line coach from 2003–2005; he also reunited with offensive coordinator and former Saints colleague Carl Smith. In 2003, his offensive line set a franchise record of 28 sacks allowed, ninth in the NFL, and running back Fred Taylor set a team rushing record of 1,572 yards.

Scott Linehan brought Boudreau in as offensive line coach for the St. Louis Rams for the 2006 and 2007 seasons. In 2006, his offensive line allowed running back Steven Jackson to rush a career best 1,528 yards.

In 2008, Boudreau became the offensive line coach for the Atlanta Falcons under head coach Mike Smith. The Falcons drafted highly touted and former fellow Boston College Eagle, Matt Ryan. Boudreau's line assisted running back Michael Turner in attaining a career high 1,699 rushing yards. Although the Falcons had winning records of 11–5, 9–7, 13–3, and 10–6 respectively, they failed to win a playoff game during this period, and Boudreau was released.

For the 2012 season, Paul Boudreau returned to St. Louis as the offensive line coach, but under a new head coach, Jeff Fisher. The Rams finished the 2012 season with a record of 7–8–1, with the tie coming against the eventual NFC champions and division rival, San Francisco 49ers. The 2013 season saw the Rams finish the season with a 7–9 record. In 2014, the Rams used their number 2 overall pick on offensive lineman, Greg Robinson, of Auburn. The Rams finished the season with a 6–10 record despite losing starting quarterback Sam Bradford to injury and splitting time between backups Shaun Hill and Austin Davis. In 2015, the Rams allowed the fewest sacks in the league (18) and finished seventh in the NFL in rushing yards per game.

== Personal life ==
Paul Boudreau met his wife Joan in Boston College. They have two children. Paul Boudreau, Jr. attended Boston College, and is an assistant coach for the Massachusetts Maritime Buccaneers football team and previously worked for the St. Louis Rams, Winnipeg Blue Bombers, and Hamilton Tiger-Cats. Jill Boudreau is the mother of four children.
