= Robert Devore Leigh =

American political scientist and administrator

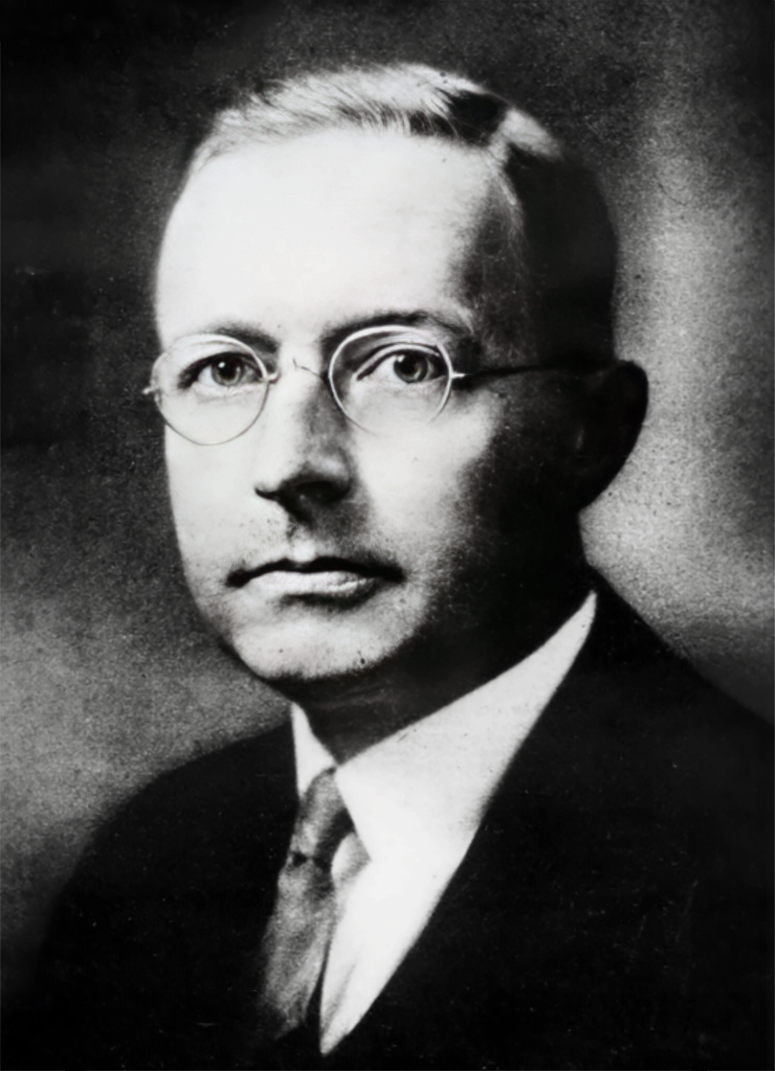
- Leigh around 1928, aged 37

President of Bennington College Dean, School of Library Service, Columbia University
- In office 1926–1940
- Succeeded by: Lewis Webster Jones

Personal details
- Born: June 11, 1890 Nelson, Nebraska, US
- Died: January 31, 1961 (aged 70–71) Chicago, Illinois, US
- Spouses: Mildred Adelaide Boardman Leigh (m. 1916; died 1959) Carma Leigh (m. 1960)
- Education: Bowdoin College; Columbia University
- Occupation: Scholar, educational administrator

Robert Devore Leigh (June 11, 1890 – January 31, 1961) was an American educator, political scientist, and leader in the field of library science. He was the founding president of Bennington College, and served there from 1928 to 1941. He made the college a center of progressive education, designing a curriculum with no rigid requirements, intensive instruction, off-campus study, and an emphasis on the arts. He attracted a faculty that included distinguished writers, artists, and dancers.

After resigning the college presidency in 1940, he served with the Foreign Broadcast Intelligence Service during World War II. After the war he was director of the University of Chicago's Commission on Freedom of the Press. He next became dean of the Columbia University School of Library Service, 1956–1959.

== Early career and family ==
Leigh was born in Nelson, Nebraska but raised in Seattle, Washington. He graduated summa cum laude from Bowdoin College in 1914. He was editor-in-chief of the school paper, manager of the football team, President of the Student Council. He taught for three years at Reed College, founded in 1911 as an experiment in progressive education. During World War I, Leigh was assistant educational director of the social hygiene department of the Public Health Service. He returned to Columbia University, where he briefly taught, and received his Ph.D. in political science in 1927. He became Hepburn Professor of Government, Williams College.

Leigh's first wife was Mildred Adelaide Boardman (1892–1959), a graduate of Reed College and a 1915 graduate of Columbia Teachers College. They were married June 23, 1916 in King County, Washington. They had two daughters. In 1960 he married his second wife, Carma Leigh, California State Librarian. He was on his way from California to a library conference when he died in Chicago of a heart attack suffered on the plane.

== Bennington College presidency ==
In 1926, Leigh became the founding president of Bennington. The site was donated, the trustees, who had been planning since 1924, and local residents had subscribed some $600,000, with $4000,000 left to raise. The Trustees announced that the college would emphasize "progressive education." The Board planned to finance the college's annual expenses by tuition, with scholarships for those in need. Expenses would be kept low by keeping living arrangements simple and college architecture straightforward though reflecting the beauty of the Taconic mountain setting.

Leigh developed the "Bennington College Program", published in 1930, in which he said that there was a demand from the "so-called progressive schoolmasters" who educated their women students in "initiative, self-expression, creative work, and independent reasoning, and self-dependence" but had to modify their programs in order for their students to meet formal college admissions requirement. Bennington would not need this type of entrance requirement, however, which would leave these progressive schools free to teach what they thought best. The college would focus more on "developing a girl's special attitudes than on molding her in a standardized educational pattern." The curriculum would be flexible, and the athletic, dramatic, musical, publication, religious, and student government incorporated into the faculty's intellectual structure. This program, Leigh, conceded, was both ambitious and expensive, and would have to wait until sufficient funds were gathered before the college could formally open. Leigh's "Educational Plan for Bennington College", published in 1932, further defined the college's intention to "fill the last important gap in the series of 'progressive' institutions" and make possible, for at least some students, "an education based on modern concepts from the nursery school to the bachelor's degree."

Leigh's first years were occupied with financing and planning the construction and renovation of the original campus buildings. The depression of 1929 forced Leigh to cut back on the Board's original plans, and Ground-breaking on the first buildings took place in 1931, the first step in the building of four semi-permanent wooden structures to be centered around a large, remodeled barn. The college enrolled its first class in the fall of 1932, eighty-eight women. When the first class graduated in 1936, Leigh's undergraduate alma mater, Bowdoin, awarded him an honorary Doctor of Laws, praising his Bennington presidency, which, the award said, "beginning with no Faculty, no students, no buildings, he has built up in eight short years until he is now seeing his first class graduate and which he is governing on the theory that traditions are to be made by breaking them...."

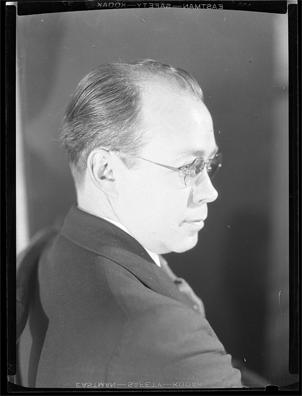
Photo by Carolyn Crossett Rowland

Leigh's progressive vision emphasized active participation in the arts and direct instruction in small classes with faculty who were active practitioners. Leigh secured faculty of such literary figures such as John Malcolm Brinnin, Robert Penn Warren, Howard Moss, and Francis Fergusson; musicians and composers such as Wallingford Riegger. He was especially enthusiastic about dance, working to found the Bennington School of Dance. Bennington became internationally known as a center for the dance under department chairman Martha Hill, who served until 1951.

The local residents sometimes raised their eyebrow at free-spirited faculty and students. Mildred Leigh took it upon herself as the president's wife to remind the faculty of their responsibilities, "almost," as one recalled," as though we had to live up to our New England setting and not be 'gypsies' in the midst of this whole progressive education," adding that the dancers did have "suntan leotards that would look very nude," and that the village thought they had a nudist colony."

Leigh also brought political thinkers to campus. In 1934 Leigh wrote to John Dewey, inviting him to visit Dewey House, named after him, and to address an evening meeting, one of a series designed to correlate the various fields of student study. He asked Dewey for a talk on "the general principles and background of liberalism and democracy", which the college was attempting to apply to fields of literature, art, science, and religion, and to clarify the terms "Fascism and Communism." In the summer of 1940, Leigh, arranged for a number of European refugee scholars to take up residence, pursue their studies, and interact with students. One of them, Karl Polanyi, delivered a series of lectures preparing for his 1944 The Great Transformation.

The faculty and Leigh sometimes grew apart. Theodore M. Newcomb, who taught psychology in the 1930s, later reflected that Leigh recruited teachers who would be open to educational innovation, but "he ended up with lots of New Deal types, some even farther left." Newcomb organized a faculty union, which Leigh opposed. Leigh also opposed Newcomb's publication of the preliminary results of what became known as the "Bennington Studies", which showed that the students, largely from affluent and conservative families, moved to the left while at Bennington.

Leigh, reported the New York Times, felt that seven years was a long enough term. He wanted to limit terms of appointment for the faculty, as well, feeling that the faculty should shift membership in the same way as trustee and overseer membership of other colleges shifted. He resigned in 1941, at the age of 50, saying he thought no college should be "shackled by executive leadership gradually growing stale, feeble or lacking in initiative." He was succeeded by a member of the Bennington faculty, Dr. Lewis Webster Jones, 42, economist and labor mediator. Leigh then joined the Institute for Advanced Study, Princeton, New Jersey.

== Career in government and higher education ==
During World War II Leigh first was director of the Foreign Broadcast Intelligence Service, chairman of the United Nations Monitoring Commission. After the war, the University of Chicago's Commission on Freedom of the Press made him director. He next was visiting professor, Columbia University, in 1950, then acting dean of the library school and in 1956 the dean.

== Major publications ==
=== Books ===
- More than the vote: the woman and her city (1920)
- Federal health administration in the United States (1927)
- Group leadership, with modern rules of procedure (1936)
- Modern rules of parliamentary procedure (1937)
- Peoples speaking to peoples (1946)
- Inequality of opportunity in higher education; a study of minority group and related barriers to college admission with David S Berkowitz et al. (1948)
- The public library in the United States; the general report of the Public Library Inquiry (1950)
- Major problems in the education of librarians (1954)

=== Articles ===
- Leigh, Robert D. (1930), "The Bennington College Program", The Journal of Higher Education, 1 (9): 520–514, doi:10.2307/1974767, JSTOR 1974767; reprinted: The Bennington College Program, The Journal of Higher Education, 70:5 (1999): 479–484, DOI: 10.1080/00221546.1999.11780778
- Leigh, Robert D. (1932). "A College Along New Lines". Journal of Education. 115 (13): 388–390. doi:10.1177/002205743211501308. S2CID 187816778.

== References and further reading ==
- Brockway, Thomas Parmelee. Bennington College, in the Beginning. (Bennington, Vt.: Bennington) College Press, 1981 ISBN 9780914378778.
- Fowlie, Wallace (1937), "The Bennington Experiment", The French Review, 11 (2): 93–101, JSTOR 379875
- McPherson, Elizabeth M. (2013), The Bennington School of the Dance: A History in Writings and Interviews, McFarland, ISBN 9780786474172
