= Joe Duckworth (American football) =

American football player (1921–2007)

No. 18
- Position: End

Personal information
- Born: July 31, 1921; Orange, New Jersey
- Died: February 18, 2007 (aged 85); Virginia Beach, Virginia

Career information
- College: Colgate

Career history
- 1947: Washington Redskins
- Stats at Pro Football Reference

Joseph Walter Duckworth (July 31, 1921 – February 18, 2007) was an American football end who played in the National Football League for the Washington Redskins. He played college football at Colgate University.

Born in Orange, New Jersey, Duckworth attended Bloomfield High School and Bordentown Military Institute.
