= William C. Fels =

President of Bennington College

President of Bennington College
- In office 1957–1964
- Preceded by: Frederick H. Burkhardt
- Succeeded by: Edward J. Bloustein

Personal details
- Born: 1916 New York City, New York
- Died: November 29, 1964 (aged 47–48) New York City, New York
- Education: Columbia University

William C. Fels (1916 – November 29, 1964) was an American academic administrator who served as fourth President of Bennington College.

== Biography ==
Fels was born in New York City in 1916, son of a dress manufacturer. He attended Bordentown Military Institute and graduated in 1937 from Columbia College, where he won the Brainerd Memorial Prize, for which he was cited as “most worthy of distinction on the ground of his qualities of mind and character.”

After receiving a master's degree from Columbia University, Fels started teaching English at Cooper Union. In 1942, Fels joined the United States Army and rose from the rank of private to captain in the Ordnance Corps. He also served as public relations officer at the ordnance school in Aberdeen, Maryland.

In 1946, Fels returned to Columbia as assistant to the general secretary, working as veteran's counselor and in the development office. From 1948 to 1956, he was secretary and associate director of the College Entrance Examination Board. There, he edited the College Board Review from 1948 to 1951 and the College Handbook for 1951. He also developed the College Scholarship Service to administer student aid funds more equitably and economically.

In 1955, Fels served as executive secretary of the Ford Foundation college grants program. In 1956, he returned to Columbia as associate provost.

Fels became President of Bennington College in 1957. As president, he served on the first planning committee for President-elect John F. Kennedy’s Peace Corps. Under his leadership, Bennington returned federal aid under the National Defense Education Act because of a requirement that required students to sign loyalty oaths, joining other colleges such as Harvard, Antioch, Goucher, and Reed.

For two months, Fels was hospitalized for cancer treatment in 1964 and died in November 1964. He was 48 years old.
