= Mary Lum (artist) =

American visual artist (born 1951)

- Born: 1951 (age 74–75); St. Cloud, Minnesota
- Education: BFA University of Michigan; MFA Rochester Institute of Technology
- Awards: John Simon Guggenheim Memorial Foundation, New York Foundation for the Arts, Radcliffe Institute for Advanced Study at Harvard, Saltonstall Foundation, MacDowell Colony
- Website: http://www.bennington.edu/academics/faculty/mary-lum

Mary Lum (born 1951) is an American visual artist whose paintings, collages and works on paper reference the urban environment, architectural forms and systems. Critic John Yau writes, "Mary Lum’s paintings on paper are based on collages, which are made from things she uses or encounters in her everyday life as well as photographs she takes of the places she visits. "

== Biography ==
Lum received a Bachelor of Fine Arts degree from the University of Michigan; and a Master’s of Fine Arts from the Rochester Institute of Technology. From 1988 to 2004, Mary Lum taught in Painting and Foundations at the New York State College of Ceramics at Alfred. Since 2005, she has taught at Bennington College. Lum is represented by Carroll and Sons Gallery in Boston, MA.

Lum has exhibited her work in numerous solo exhibitions and group shows in the United States, and abroad, including Norway, Portugal, Switzerland, and other countries. She has received fellowships and grants from the John Simon Guggenheim Memorial Foundation, the New York Foundation for the Arts, the Bunting Fellowship at Radcliffe, the Saltonstall Foundation, and has been awarded residencies at the MacDowell Colony, the International Studio/Curatorial Program in New York and at Oxford University in the UK.

== Exhibitions and projects ==
Lum has exhibited her work widely. She has participated in 24 solo exhibitions at national and international venues including the Aldrich Contemporary Art Museum, Ridgefield, CT; Washington Project for the Arts, Washington, DC, Gallerie Birthe Laursen, Paris, Prance, Radcliffe Institute for Advanced Study, Cambridge, MA, among others; and in over 30 group exhibitions at the Danforth Museum of Art (Framingham, MA), the Drawing Center, New York, NY; Beijing Academy of Fine Arts (Beijing, China); Herbert F. Johnson Museum at Cornell University (Ithaca, NY); MassMoCA Museum (North Adams, MA); Kunstmuseum-Museum fur Gegenwartskunst-Basel (Switzerland), and at the Yancey Richardson Gallery in NYC, among others. She has been commissioned by MASS MoCA to create an artist-designed public art billboard, "Made With Pride By" and other art billboard projects, "This is Only a Test" (Los Angeles) and "Billboard Structure" (Buffalo, NY).

== Grants, awards, residencies ==
In 2026, Lum received a MacDowell fellowship (also 2018, 2012, 2007, 2003, and 1994) and was a resident visiting artist at the International Center of Photography/Bard College program in 2018. Mary Lum was awarded as the Honored Educator of the Year in 2022 by the College Art Association. In 2010, she received a Guggenheim Foundation fellowship, and a residency from the Cité internationale des arts in Paris (also in 2006 and 2002). In 2009, Lum was an Artist in Residence at St. John's College at the University of Oxford, in the UK. In 2004, she was awarded a Radcliffe Institute for Advanced Study/Harvard University fellowship, as well as a Saltonstall Foundation artist's fellowship. In 1992, she received a grant from the Mid-Atlantic Arts Foundation, the Washington Project for the Arts. In 1990, the New York State Council on the Arts awarded Lum with an Individual Sponsored Project Grant; in 1998 she received an individual artists grant from the National Endowment for the Arts, and in 1987, she received an artist's fellowship from the New York Foundation for the Arts.

== Collections ==
Lum's work is included in numerous private and public collections including the Baltimore Museum of Art (Baltimore, MD); DeCordova Museum and Sculpture Park (Lincoln, MA); Everson Museum (Syracuse, NY); and the Museum of Modern Art, New York.
