= Lewis Webster Jones =

American academic administrator

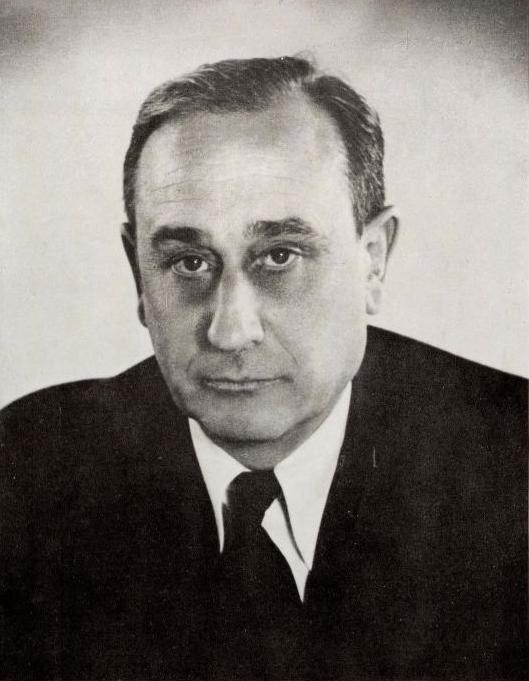

15th President of Rutgers University
- In office 1951–1958
- Preceded by: Robert Clarkson Clothier
- Succeeded by: Mason Welch Gross

Personal details
- Born: June 11, 1899 Emerson, Nebraska, U.S.
- Died: September 10, 1975 (aged 76) Sarasota, Florida, U.S.
- Cause of death: Pneumonia
- Education: Reed College; Brookings Institution

Lewis Webster Jones (June 11, 1899 – September 10, 1975) was an economist, and the president of Bennington College from 1941 to 1947, the University of Arkansas from 1947 to 1951, and Rutgers University from 1951 to 1958.

== Biography ==
Jones was born in Emerson, Nebraska, and spent his youth in Portland, Oregon.

He received his undergraduate degree from Reed College, and later earned his PhD from the Brookings Graduate School of Economics and Government (now the Brookings Institution). He did post-doctoral work at Columbia University, London School of Economics, University of Cambridge, University of Geneva and Graduate Institute of International Studies in Geneva. During his studies in Europe, he served as an economist on the staff of the League of Nations.

He joined the faculty of Bennington College in 1932, where he served as president from 1941 to 1947. He served from 1947 to 1951 as the 12th president of the University of Arkansas. He started the process of rebuilding the university after World War II. New graduate programs were begun and expanded, and new buildings were added. Most notable were the Fine Arts and Law School buildings.

In 1950 and 1951, Jones was on the president's Water Resources Policy Commission.

In 1951, he was appointed the fifteenth president of Rutgers University. He oversaw the completion of the university's transformation into the State University in 1956, and massive construction efforts across the university's College Avenue, Busch, Cook and Douglass campuses. The Graduate School of Social Work, ranked as one of the finest in the United States, the Graduate School of Library Science (now part of the School of Communication, Information and Library Science), and the Eagleton Institute of Politics were established during his tenure.

Jones resigned as president of Rutgers in 1958, to accept the presidency of the National Conference of Christians and Jews.

In 1965, he retired to Sarasota, Florida, where he lived until his death on September 10, 1975.

Academic offices
Preceded by Robert Devore Leigh	President of Bennington College; 1941–1947	Succeeded by Frederick H. Burkhardt
Preceded by Arthur F. Harding	President of University of Arkansas; 1947–1951	Succeeded by John Tyler Caldwell
Preceded by Robert Clarkson Clothier	President of Rutgers University; 1951–1958	Succeeded by Mason Welch Gross
