= John Atamian =

American gridiron football player (born 1942)

No. 57 (CGY)
- Positions: Halfback, Left tackle

Personal information
- Born: September 7, 1942 (age 84); St. Catharines, Ontario, Canada
- Died: June 4, 2024; Surprise, Arizona, U.S.
- Listed height: 6 ft 1 in (1.85 m)
- Listed weight: 245 lb (111 kg)

Career information
- High school: Bishop Duffy (Niagara Falls, New York); Bordentown Military Institute (Bordentown, New Jersey)
- College: Notre Dame (1961–1964)

Career history
- 1965: Toronto Argonauts
- 1965: Hamilton Tiger-Cats
- 1966–1967: Toronto Argonauts
- 1967–1968: Saskatchewan Roughriders
- 1969: Winnipeg Blue Bombers
- 1970–1972: Calgary Stampeders

Awards and highlights
- 2× Grey Cup champion (1965, 1971)

John B. Atamian (born September 7, 1942 - Died June 4, 2024) was a Canadian football player who played for the Hamilton Tiger-Cats, Toronto Argonauts, Saskatchewan Roughriders, Winnipeg Blue Bombers and Calgary Stampeders. He won the Grey Cup with the Tiger-Cats in 1965 and with the Stampeders in 1971. He played college football at the University of Notre Dame in Notre Dame, Indiana.
