= Elissa Tenny =

University president and educator

15th President of the School of the Art Institute of Chicago
- In office July 2016 – May 2024
- Preceded by: Walter E. Massey
- Succeeded by: Jiseon Lee Isbara

Personal details
- Born: 1953 (age 72–73)
- Education: Stockton University (BA) University of Pennsylvania (MA, DEd)

Elissa Tenny (born 1953) is an American academic and educator and the fifteenth President of the School of the Art Institute of Chicago (SAIC). She is also the first woman to hold the title of President at SAIC in its 158-year history.

== SAIC history ==
Founded in 1866, the School of the Art Institute of Chicago is a top-ranked art and design college and was named the "most influential art school in the United States" in Columbia University's Art Critics National Arts Journalism Survey. It was revealed in a 2020 F Newsmagazine article that Tenny was the second-most highly paid individual in the AIC system, earning around $711,000 annually - second only to the Museum's President, James Rondeau.

== Education and career ==
Tenny received a Bachelor of Arts in Business Administration from Stockton University in 1975, a Master of Arts in Media Studies from The New School in 1977, and a Doctor of Education from the University of Pennsylvania in 2007. She started her career in education while attending the New School, eventually holding positions of Acting Dean (1998–2001) and Vice Dean (2001–02). From 2002 to 2010, she was Provost and Dean at Bennington College, joining SAIC as Provost in 2010, where she served until being named president in 2016.

It was announced at the end of March 2023 that Tenny would be stepping down from her position as President of SAIC at the end of the 2023-24 school year, and would be replaced by Jiseon Lee Isbara (the former Provost at Otis College of Art and Design) upon her retirement.

== Actions and terms at SAIC ==
Tenny was President at SAIC during the period of COVID-19 pandemic restrictions. She came under criticism for some of her actions during her tenure. Her "commitment on racial equality [has been] questionable", per the student publication f Newsmagazine; many community members referenced SAIC Provost Martin Berger's usage of a racial slur during an introductory lecture in 2018, and Tenny's lack of reprimand over these remarks. In fact, Berger was promoted to his current position as Provost after making these remarks, which led to the SAIC community becoming concerned over both Tenny and the Board officials at that time, as told by students in the f Newsmagazine, as well as through internal emails set to SAIC students by Berger. The Chicago Reader stated that SAIC was often "replete with microaggressions or outright discrimination", and that complaints of racism were "dealt with individually, rather than systemically, if they are dealt with at all."

There was controversy surrounding Tenny's emails addressing the ongoing Gaza war, which "depoliticized the events" and "failed to present a full picture of what is happening in Gaza" per f Newsmagazine, and SAIC students quoted in that article.

She has been praised for some of her SAIC community decisions, such as the creation and fund allocation for a SAIC Anti-Racism Committee, which was formed after the events of the Chicago Black Lives Matter protests in 2020. She has also created and supported the First-Generation Fellows program at SAIC, which provides resources and advice for first-generation college-goers at the institution, in response to her struggle as a first-generation student. In the same vein, Tenny also contributed to the School’s College Arts Access Program (CAAP), a three-year program for Chicago Public High School students. She launched Make Way: A Roadmap to Student Access, Equity, and Affordability, an initiative that exceeded its fundraising goal and raised more than $25 million for student scholarships, wellness, and paid internships.
