= Robert Clarkson Clothier =

14th President of Rutgers University
- In office 1932–1951
- Preceded by: Philip Milledoler Brett
- Succeeded by: Lewis Webster Jones

Personal details
- Born: January 8, 1885 Philadelphia, Pennsylvania
- Died: March 18, 1970 (aged 85) Bryn Mawr, Pennsylvania
- Parent(s): Agnes Evans (1849–1900); Clarkson Clothier (1846–1917).

Robert Clarkson Clothier (January 8, 1885 – March 18, 1970) was the fourteenth president of Rutgers University, serving from 1932 to 1951.

== Biography ==
Robert was born on January 8, 1885, in Philadelphia, Pennsylvania, to Agnes Evans (1849–1900) and Clarkson Clothier (1846–1917). Clarkson was the brother of Isaac H. Clothier, one of the founders of Strawbridge and Clothier, the Philadelphia department store. After the death of his wife, Clarkson married Florence Merwin (c1860-1938). Robert had three sisters: Marion Clothier (1879–1973), Edith Clothier (1881-?), and Florence (1883–1888).

Robert attended The Haverford School from 1894 to 1903; then attended Princeton University, where he was editor-in-chief of the Daily Princetonian, and a member of the senior council. He graduated with a Bachelor of Laws degree from Princeton in 1908, then worked for The Wall Street Journal as a reporter, and was the employment manager of Curtis Publishing Company. During World War I he was at the War Department's committee on classification of personnel, and was later commissioned a lieutenant colonel in the United States Army. He then served as a special representative for the Secretary of War. After the war he helped organize Scott Company, which were consultants in human resources. He then joined The Haverford School as assistant headmaster and then as headmaster. He married Nathalie Cowgill Wilson (1886–1966) on June 24, 1916, and had three children: Agnes Evans Clothier (1917–1961), Arthur Wilson Clothier (1919–1942) and Robert Clarkson Clothier, Jr. (1925–2003). In 1929, Clothier was appointed Dean of Men at the University of Pittsburgh.

In 1932, he became President of Rutgers University, and during his tenure, the university expanded from New Brunswick, New Jersey to acquire the "River Road Campus" (now known as the Busch Campus), a 256-acre (1 km^{2}) tract in neighboring Piscataway, New Jersey. Further expansion was made to the campus of Cook College, the university's school of agriculture. During World War II, Clothier positioned Rutgers within the domestic war effort, hosting the Army Student training program. Subsequent to the war, Clothier oversaw further expansion of Rutgers, especially as a result of the G.I. Bill, and declared that the University would accommodate "all qualified veterans and high school graduates for whom it is possible to provide, not just those whom it is convenient to take." In these years, also, Rutgers would become the State University, and incorporate the University of Newark (now Rutgers–Newark campus) and the College of South Jersey (now Rutgers–Camden campus).

I seem to see a great university, great in endowment, in land, in buildings, in equipment, but greater still, second to none, in its practical idealism, and its social usefulness.

— Robert Clarkson Clothier in November 1932

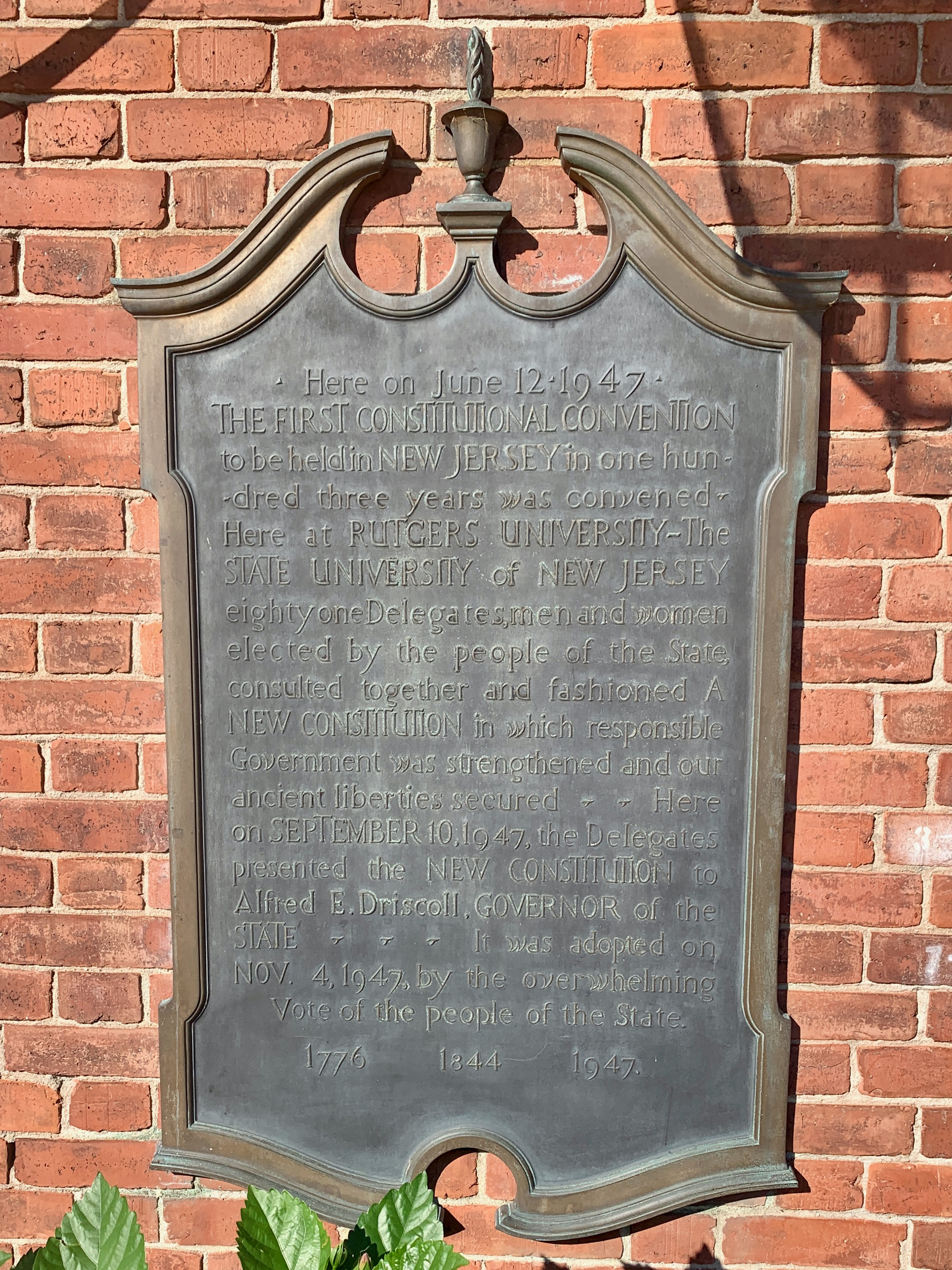
Plaque describing constitutional convention

In the summer of 1947, he served as president of the New Jersey Constitutional Convention, held in the College Avenue Gymnasium, that produced the state's third constitution. In 1951, Clothier retired from the presidency of Rutgers University.

He moved to Haverford, Pennsylvania. He died in 1970, at Bryn Mawr Hospital in Bryn Mawr, Pennsylvania.
