= Francis J. Bloustein =

American judge

Francis J. Bloustein (May 17, 1906 - May 16, 1984) was a New York Supreme Court justice. He was the brother of Edward J. Bloustein.
