= Paul Blustein =

Paul Blustein is an American economic journalist and author. He is a former reporter for The Washington Post and The Wall Street Journal.

== Books ==
- King Dollar: The Past and Future of the World's Dominant Currency (Yale University Press, 2025)
- Schism: China, America and the Fracturing of the Global Trading System (CIGI Press, 2019)
- Off Balance: The Travails of Institutions That Govern the Global Financial System (CIGI Press, 2016)
- Misadventures of the Most Favored Nations: Clashing Egos, Inflated Ambitions, and the Great Shambles of the World Trade System (PublicAffairs, 2009)
- And the Money Kept Rolling In (and Out) Wall Street, the IMF, and the Bankrupting of Argentina (PublicAffairs, 2006)
- The Chastening: Inside The Crisis That Rocked The Global Financial System And Humbled The IMF (Public Affairs, 2001)
