= Frederick Burkhardt =

American academic (1912–2007)

President of Bennington College
- In office 1947–1949
- Preceded by: Lewis Webster Jones
- In office 1952–1957
- Succeeded by: William C. Fels

Personal details
- Born: September 13, 1912 Brooklyn, New York
- Died: September 23, 2007 (aged 94) Bennington, Vermont
- Education: Columbia University; University of Oxford

Frederick Henry Burkhardt (13 September 1912 – 23 September 2007) was an American educator and foundation administrator. He was President of the American Council of Learned Societies (ACLS), then after his retirement devoted decades of work on The Correspondence of Charles Darwin.

He was an Honorary Fellow of Clare Hall, Cambridge. Dr. Burkhardt served as President of Bennington College in Vermont from 1947 to 1949 and from 1952 to 1957.

Burkhardt graduated from Columbia University with a B.A. in 1933 and a Ph.D. in 1940. He also earned a second bachelor's degree from the University of Oxford in 1935.

Burkhardt died on September 23, 2007, in Bennington, Vermont.
