= Edward J. Bloustein Distinguished Scholar =

New Jersey education scholarship

Edward J. Bloustein Distinguished Scholars are recognized as the highest achieving graduating high school students in or from New Jersey and are granted awards regardless of need.

Students are selected on the basis of the following criteria:

1. class rank of one, two, or three in the graduating class; or
2. class rank within the top 10 percent of the graduating class at the end of the junior year with combined critical reading and math SAT scores of 1,260 or higher at the end of the junior year.

New Jersey students attending out-of-state secondary schools must rank in the top 10% of their class and have combined critical reading and math SAT scores of at least 1,260.

Distinguished Scholars are offered an annual award of up to $1,000 without regard to financial need. The scholarship may be available for up to four years of undergraduate study at a New Jersey college or university, if funds are appropriated by the New Jersey Legislature each year. The recipient must enroll full-time during the academic year following his or her secondary school graduation at a New Jersey college or university to receive payment of the award.

More than 5,000 Distinguished Scholars received award offers for the 2006-07 collegiate academic year. For the 2005-06 selection process, secondary schools submitted names and academic information of more than 20,400 students.

The award was established in the 1989-1990 academic year and posthumously honors Edward J. Bloustein, the seventeenth President of Rutgers University.

On April 27, 2010, Distinguished Scholars were informed by letter that "in light of the economic challenges facing the State of New Jersey, difficult decisions regarding program funding had to be made. One of the budget recommendations is to suspend funding for new Distinguished Scholar as well as new NJ STARS awards for the 2010-2011 academic year. Over the next few months, the legislature will review the recommended budget prior to finalizing it by July 1. You will be notified if the budget includes funding for new Distinguished Scholars and/or new NJ STARS students."

As of now, the HESAA website states the program "recognizes outstanding academic achievement of New Jersey high school seniors who graduated prior to 2010," indicating it has been discontinued.
