= Edward J. Bloustein =

17th President of Rutgers University
- In office 1971–1989
- Preceded by: Mason Welch Gross
- Succeeded by: Francis Leo Lawrence

President of Bennington College
- In office 1965–1971
- Preceded by: William C. Fels
- Succeeded by: Gail Thain Parker

Personal details
- Born: Edward Jerome Bloustein; January 20, 1925 Bronx, New York
- Died: December 9, 1989 (aged 64) Nassau, Bahamas
- Spouse: Ruth Ellen Steinman (1923–1988)
- Relations: Francis Bloustein, brother
- Education: New York University (B.A.); University of Oxford (B.Phil.); Cornell University (Ph.D., LL.B.)

Edward Jerome Bloustein (January 20, 1925 – December 9, 1989) was the 17th President of Rutgers University, serving from 1971 to 1989.

== Biography ==
He was born in New York City, and he graduated from James Monroe High School in the Bronx in 1942. He served in the United States Army from 1943 to 1946. He received a Bachelor of Arts degree from New York University in 1948 and subsequently traveled to the University of Oxford as a Fulbright scholar and received a Bachelor of Philosophy degree in 1950. Returning to the United States, he taught philosophy briefly at Brooklyn College and spent close to a year in Washington, DC with the Office of Intelligence in the State Department, where he served as a political analyst, specializing in Marxist theory and international political movements in the German Democratic Republic. Later, Bloustein earned a Doctor of Philosophy degree in 1954 from Cornell University, and entered Cornell Law School earning a Bachelor of Laws in 1959. During that time, he served as Editor-in-Chief of the Cornell Law Quarterly.

Bloustein began his professional career as a law clerk to Judge Stanley H. Fuld of the New York State Court of Appeals, serving from 1959 to 1961. He then joined the faculty of the New York University School of Law until 1965, when he was named president of Bennington College. In 1971, following the retirement of Mason Welch Gross he was appointed president of Rutgers University.

During his tenure as President of Rutgers University, Bloustein implemented programs that expanded the institution's research facilities, attracted internationally known scholars to the faculty, and achieved distinction as one of the major public research universities in the nation, leading to an invitation for Rutgers to join the Association of American Universities. Bloustein died in the Bahamas on December 9, 1989.

== Legacy ==
The Edward J. Bloustein School of Planning and Public Policy at Rutgers–New Brunswick is named in his honor. The Edward J. Bloustein Distinguished Scholar is named in his honor. The Bloustein Lecture in Law and Ethics, hosted by the Rutgers Institute for Law and Philosophy and funded by a gift Bloustein made to Rutgers Law School, is also named in his honor.
