= Blaustein (surname) =

Blaustein (German: "blue stone") is a surname. Notable people with the surname include:

- Albert Blaustein (1921–1994), American lawyer and constitutional consultant
- Barry W. Blaustein (1954–2026), American screenwriter and film director
- David Blaustein, ABC News Radio correspondent and movie critic
- David Blaustein (educator) (1866–1912), Belarusian-American educator, rabbi, and social worker
- Jeremy Blaustein (born 1966), American translator
- Julian Blaustein (1913–1995), American film producer
- Louis Blaustein (1869–1937), American businessman and philanthropist
- Maddie Blaustein (1960–2008), American voice actress
- Susana Blaustein Muñoz, Argentine film director

== See also ==
- Blaustein Building, Baltimore, Maryland
- Bluestein
- Jacob Blaustein Institutes for Desert Research, an academic facility of the Ben-Gurion University of the Negev
