= Joseph S. Iseman =

American lawyer

Joseph S. Iseman (May 29, 1916 – April 25, 2006) was an American attorney and educator known for his work with National Television, Children's Television Workshop, also known as Sesame Workshop, and Bennington College (where he stepped in as acting president in 1976), as well as the American University of Paris, where he served for a time as the vice chair. As a lawyer at the firm of Paul, Weiss, Rifkind, Wharton & Garrison LLP, Iseman notably managed the estates of composer Cole Porter, writer Vladimir Nabokov, writer Jean Stafford, poet Robert Lowell, writer A. J. Liebling, artist Robert Motherwell, writer and historian Theodore H. White, Saturday Review and its editor Norman Cousins, and playwright Arthur Miller. He was also the father of New York City businessman Frederick Iseman.

== Education and early career ==
Iseman attended the Ethical Culture School in New York, earned his Bachelor of Arts degree from Harvard College in Cambridge, Massachusetts in 1937, and his J.D. from Yale Law School in New Haven, Connecticut in 1941.

Iseman worked as an investigator and clerk for Commercial Factors Corporation from 1937 to 1938. After graduating from Yale, he worked as an attorney until he joined the United States Army during World War II from 1942 to 1946. He obtained the rank of captain in the Army Air Force.

== Law and education career ==
After his return to the United States, Iseman moved to New York and worked for Chadbourne, Wallace, Parke and Whiteside as a law associate. In 1950, he left to practice law at Paul, Weiss, Rifkind, Wharton and Garrison. At this firm he was made a full partner in 1954 where he worked in the area of legal affairs for public broadcasting.

Joseph Iseman was a trustee of Bennington College, and for one year was Acting President in 1976. Iseman was a Woodrow Wilson Visiting Fellow at the College of William and Mary in Williamsburg, Virginia and at six other American colleges and universities from 1977 through 1984. Iseman was vice-chairman of the board of directors of the American University of Paris and a Director of the Civic Education Project.

== Death ==
Iseman died at the age of 89. According to his family, the cause of death was cardiac arrest.
