= Bennington College =

Liberal arts college in Vermont

Coordinates: 42.924817°N 73.23673°W

- College logo
- Type: Private liberal arts college
- Established: 1932; 94 years ago
- Accreditation: NECHE
- Endowment: $52.9 million
- President: R. Danielle Egan
- Provost: Maurice Hall
- Faculty: 62 FT/ 66 PT
- Students: 800 (2026)
- Undergraduates: 708 (2026)
- Postgraduates: 91 (2023)
- Location: Bennington, Vermont, U.S.
- Campus: Rural, 440 acres (1.8 km^{2})
- Website: bennington.edu

Bennington College is a private liberal arts college in Bennington, Vermont, United States. Founded as a women’s college in 1932, it became co-educational in 1969. It is accredited by the New England Commission of Higher Education.

== History ==
=== 1920s ===
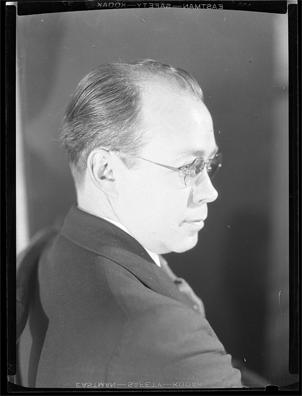
Robert Devore Leigh

The planning for the establishment of Bennington College began in 1924 and took nine years to be realized. While many people were involved, the four central figures in the founding of Bennington College were Vincent Ravi Booth, Mr. and Mrs. Hall Park McCullough, and William Heard Kilpatrick.

A Women's Committee, headed by Mrs. Hall Park McCullough, organized the Colony Club Meeting in 1924, which brought together some 500 civic leaders and educators from across the country. As a result of the Colony Club Meeting, a charter was secured and a board of trustees formed for Bennington College. American educator John Dewey, helped shape many of the college's signature programs such as The Plan Process and Field Work Term through his educational principles.

In 1928, six years before the college would begin, Robert Devore Leigh was recruited by the Bennington College executive committee to serve as the first president of Bennington. Leigh presided over the forging of Bennington's structure and its early operation. In 1929 Leigh authored the Bennington College Prospectus which outlined the "Bennington idea".

=== 1930s ===
Bennington was founded as a women’s college in 1932 and the first class of 87 women arrived on campus that year. The college was the first to include the visual and performing arts as full-fledged elements of the liberal arts curriculum.

Every year since the college began in 1932, every Bennington College student has engaged in internships and volunteer opportunities each winter term. Originally called the Winter Field & Reading Period, the two-month term was described by President Robert Devore Leigh in his 1928 Bennington College Prospectus as "a long winter recess giving students and faculty opportunity for travel, field work, and educational advantages of metropolitan life". This internship was renamed twice, as Non-Resident term and, as it is called today, Field Work Term.

In 1934, the Bennington School of Dance summer program was founded by Martha Hill. Martha Graham, Doris Humphrey, Hanya Holm, and Charles Weidman all taught at this laboratory. The program gained attendance by José Limón, Bessie Schonberg, Merce Cunningham, and Betty Ford. In 1935 the administration agreed to admit young men into the Bennington Theater Studio program, since men were needed for theatrical performances. Among the men who attended was the actor Alan Arkin.

Between 1935 and 1939, the famous social psychologist Theodore Newcomb conducted a study about the change of political attitude during the New Deal period.

President Leigh resigned in 1941, at the age of 50, saying he thought no college should be "shackled by executive leadership gradually growing stale, feeble or lacking in initiative". He was succeeded by a member of the Bennington faculty, Dr. Lewis Webster Jones, economist and labor mediator.

=== 1940s–1980s ===
In 1946, Paula Jean Welden, a sophomore at the college, disappeared while on a hike of the nearby Long Trail. She was living in Dewey House at the time and had traveled alone. Many students assisted in the search, but Paula was never found. Frederick H. Burkhardt, who had been ready to decline an invitation to become president of the college, visited the campus was impressed with the cohesion and support of the community in the face of this tragedy and accepted the offer. At age 35, he became the youngest college president in the nation.

In 1951, the U.S. State Department issued a documentary on Bennington highlighting its unique educational approach as a model for the Allied rebuilding of German society after World War II.

The college continued to expand its physical infrastructure. Built in 1959, the Edward Clark Crossett Library was designed by the modernist architect Pietro Belluschi. After opening, Crossett Library was featured in Architectural Forum and became a focus of study for many architecture students in the 1960s. Crossett Library went on to win the 1963 Honor Award for library design. In 1968, three new student houses were completed to help house the growing student population and were named in honor of William C. Fels, Jessie Smith Noyes, and Margaret Smith Sawtell. These houses were designed by modernist architect Edward Larrabee Barnes.

In 1969, Bennington became fully coeducational, a move that attracted major national attention, including a major feature story in The New York Times Magazine. The presidency of Gail Thain Parker from 1972 to 1976 was marked by controversy over curriculum reform, affirmative action, and relations between faculty and administration.

=== 1990s: "The Symposium" and aftermath ===
In 1993, the Bennington College Board of Trustees initiated a process known as "The Symposium". Arguing that the college suffered from "a growing attachment to the status quo that, if unattended, is lethal to Bennington's purpose and pedagogy", the board of trustees "solicit[ed] ... concerns and proposals on a wide and open-ended range of issues from every member of the faculty, every student, every staff member, every alumna and alumnus, and dozens of friends of the College." According to the trustees, the process was intended to reinvent the college, and the board said it received over 600 contributions to this end.

The results of the process were published in June 1994 in a 36-page document titled Symposium Report of the Bennington College Board of Trustees. Recommended changes included the following:

- Adoption of a "teacher-practitioner" ideal;
- Abandonment of academic divisions in favor of "polymorphous, dynamically changing Faculty Program Groups";
- Replacement of the college's system of presumptive tenure with "an experimental contract system"; and
- A 10% tuition reduction over the following five years. In 1988, according to The New York Times, Bennington was the most expensive college in the country.

Near the end of June 1994, 27 faculty members (approximately one-third of the total faculty body) were notified by certified mail that their contracts would not be renewed. (The exact number of fired faculty members is listed as 25 or 26 in some reports, a discrepancy partly because at least one faculty member, photographer Neil Rappaport, was reinstated on appeal shortly after his firing.) As recommended in the Symposium, the trustees abolished the presumptive tenure system, leaving the institution with no form of tenure. The firings attracted considerable media attention.

Some students and alumni protested, and the college was censured for its actions by both the American Association of University Professors and the American Philosophical Association. The AAUP noted that "academic freedom is insecure, and academic tenure is nonexistent today at Bennington College."

Critics of the Symposium, and the 1994 firings, have alleged that the Symposium was essentially a sham, designed to provide a pretext for the removal of faculty members to whom the college's president, Elizabeth Coleman, was hostile. Some have questioned the timing of the firings, arguing that by waiting until the end of June, the college made it impossible for students affected by the firings to transfer to other institutions.

President Coleman responded that the decision was fundamentally "about ideas", stating that "Bennington became mediocre over time" and that the college was in need of radical change. Coleman argued that the college was in dire financial straits, saying that "had Bennington done nothing ... the future of this institution was seriously in doubt." In a letter to The New York Times, John Barr, chairman of the board of trustees, asserted that Coleman was "not responsible for the redesign of the college ... It was the board of trustees".

In May 1996, 17 of the faculty members terminated in the 1994 firings filed a lawsuit against Bennington College, seeking $3.7 million in damages and reinstatement to their former positions. In December 2000, the case was settled out of court; as part of the settlement, the fired faculty members received $1.89 million and an apology from the college. In the immediate wake of the controversy, for the 1994–1995 academic year, the college's enrollment dropped to a record low of 370 undergraduates, and the following year (1995–1996), undergraduate enrollment declined to 285. According to Coleman, a student body of 600 undergraduates was required for the college to break even.

=== 2000s and 2010s ===
As of 2015, the college reports a total enrollment of 755 students with steady increases in quality student applications. Bennington College appeared in the Princeton Review's 2018 Best Northeastern Colleges List. Bennington also appeared on Princeton's "Green Schools" list. The college was also featured in a 2016 article by Forbes as one of "Tomorrow's Hot Colleges" highlighting the institution's recent flourishing "under bold, entrepreneurial leadership".

In 2015, Bennington College announced a $5 million gift from the Helen Frankenthaler Foundation. The largest single gift ever awarded by the foundation has helped establish the Helen Frankenthaler Fund for the Visual Arts and provides support for all aspects of the school's visual arts program including curricula, facilities, programs, and faculty. In recognition of the gift, the visual arts wing of the college's 120,000-square-foot arts facility was renamed the Helen Frankenthaler Visual Arts Center.

In October 2016, the faculty adopted an open-access policy to make its scholarship publicly accessible online.

In the summer of 2020, the board of trustees announced that Laura Walker would be the next college president. Walker remained president through the end of the Fall 2025 term and was replaced by Elissa Tenny in an interim capacity.

R. Danielle Egan was named the college's 12th president on June 15, 2026, with her term effective August 1, 2026.

=== Presidents ===
Term	Name
1928–1941	Robert Devore Leigh
1941–1947	Lewis Webster Jones
1947–1957	Frederick H. Burkhardt
1957–1964	William C. Fels
1965–1971	Edward J. Bloustein
1972–1976	Gail Thain Parker
spring 1976	Joseph S. Iseman (interim)
fall 1976	Robert Woodworth (interim)
1977–1982	Joseph S. Murphy
1982–1986	Michael K. Hooker
1987–2013	Elizabeth Coleman
2013–2019	Mariko Silver
2019–2020	Isabel Roche (interim)
2020–2025	Laura Ruth Walker
2026–2026	Elissa Tenny (interim)
2026–present	R. Danielle Egan

== Academics ==
In 2024, the college had a student to faculty ratio of 9:1 with 63% of classes with fewer than 20 students. Bennington College is accredited by the New England Commission of Higher Education.

=== Undergraduate admissions ===
In 2024, the college accepted 45.3% of undergraduate applicants, with those admitted having an average 3.51 GPA. Bennington is test optional, thus does not require submission of standardized test scores. Those submitting test scores had an average 1260-1370 SAT score (13% submitting scores) or average 29-33 ACT score (5% submitting scores).

=== Rankings ===
In 2026, U.S. News & World Report ranked Bennington tied for No.121 in National Liberal Arts Colleges, tied for No.18 in Most Innovative Schools, tied for No.59 in Best Undergraduate Teaching, and tied for No.141 in Top Performers on Social Mobility out of 211 National Liberal Arts Colleges.

=== Plan Process ===
At Bennington, students receive graduate-style advising from a faculty member who assists with course selection, internship and job applications, graduate school preparation, and more. Bennington does not have traditional academic majors for undergraduate students. Instead, the Plan Process is an alternative to majors, which encourages students to lead their own education, rather than choosing from pre-existing paths.

Within the Plan Process, there are no required courses. In their second year, students must submit an essay-style Plan proposal, which details their desired primary and secondary areas of study, a summary of their interests and previous coursework, and a framework for how their studies should progress to culminate in senior work in one of the existing disciplines such as Society, Culture and Thought, Advancement of Public Action, Dance, Environmental Studies, and Visual Arts. Students then meet with a committee of faculty members and their academic adviser to review the proposed plan and make any necessary changes. After their plan is improved, students regularly meet with their adviser to choose relevant courses and meet again with the plan committee each fall to discuss their progress towards completion.

=== Field Work Term ===
Field Work Term is a required annual internship program that gives students the opportunity to gain professional experience beyond the classroom before graduating. Field Work Term experiences often inform students' decisions about career planning and can even lead to job opportunities post graduation. Bennington is the only college that has required an annual internship for students since its founding.

=== Special programs ===
- Center for Creative Teaching
- Isabelle Kaplan Center for Languages and Culture
- The Museum Fellows Term
- Quantum Leap Program

=== Graduate programs ===
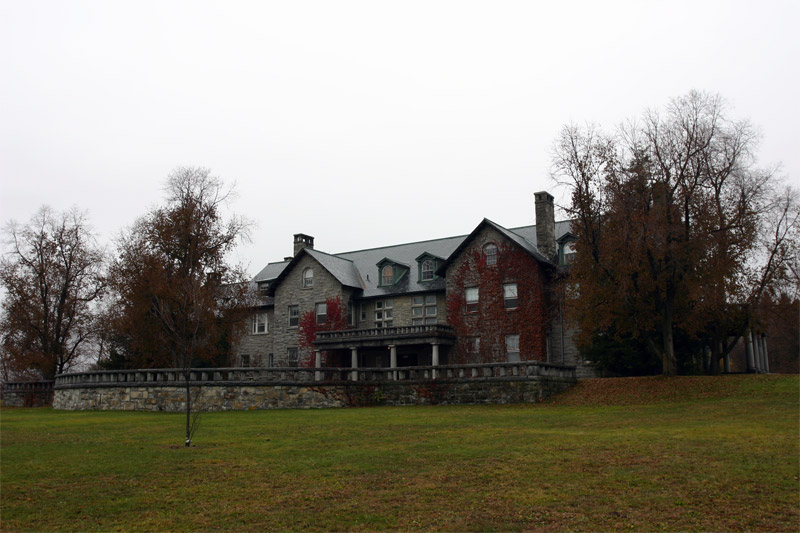
Jennings, the college's music building.

Bennington college offers the Master of Fine Arts (MFA) in multiple disciplines and the Postbaccalaureate Premedical Program. Previously an MAT or BA/MAT was offered in Education through the Center for Creative Teaching, until discontinued around 2012.

==== Bennington Writing Seminars ====
Bennington Writing Seminars is a low-residency Master of Fine Arts program in writing co-created by Robert McDowell and Liam Rector and founded by Poet Liam Rector in 1994. After Rector's death in August 2007, Sven Birkerts was director until 2017. Poet Mark Wunderlich is the current director of Bennington Writing Seminars. U.S. Poet Laureate Donald Hall was a long-time writer-in-residence. In 2007, The Atlantic named it one of the nation's best, and Poets & Writers Magazine named it one of the top three low-residency programs in the world in 2011.

==== Dance ====
The MFA in Dance is designed as a two-year, four-term program; however, those who cannot commit to four consecutive terms are encouraged to propose an alternative schedule when applying.

==== Music ====
Like the MFA in Dance program, the MFA in Music is a two-year, four-term program. Students pursue work at an advanced level in either composition or voice. (In exceptional cases, students wishing to pursue postgraduate work in other performance areas may be considered.)

==== Public Action ====
The Center for the Advancement of Public Action at Bennington College established a Master of Fine Arts in Public Action in 2018. Directed by Susan Sgorbati, the program aims to support artists working in social justice.

==== PostBac PreMed ====
Bennington's PostBac program was suspended indefinitely in 2021. It was a one-year program, beginning and ending in June, and it covered the basic requirements for medical school and other health profession tracks.

== Campus ==
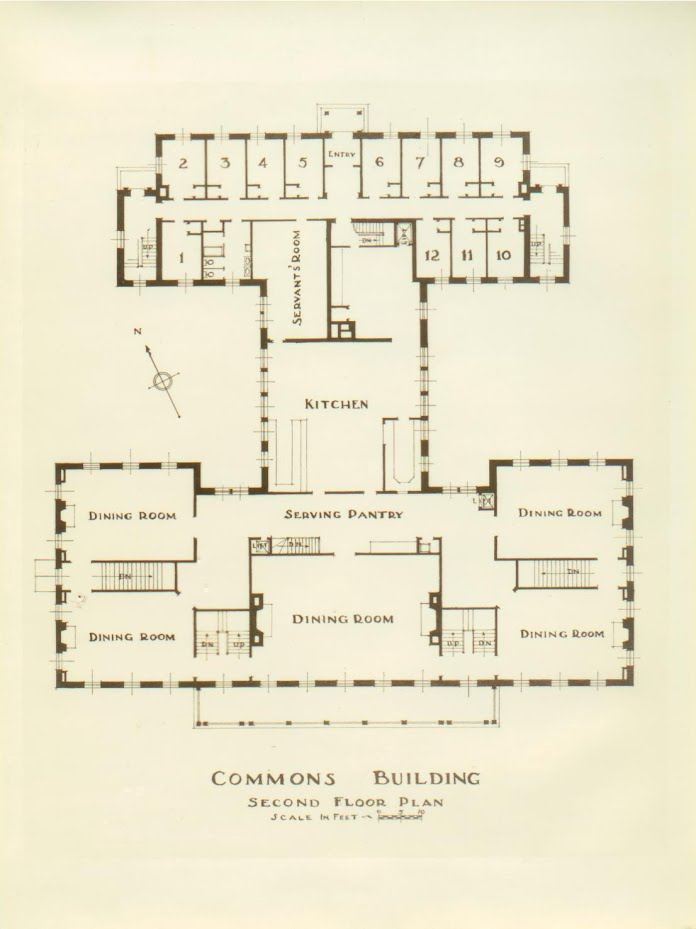
The Commons Building

The groundbreaking ceremony for Bennington College took place on August 16, 1931, and construction of the original Bennington College campus was completed by 1936. The Boston architectural firm, J.W. Ames and E.S. Dodge designed Commons, the 12 original student houses, as well as the reconfiguration of the Barn from a working farm building into classrooms and administrative offices. The original student houses were named for the people integral to the founding of the college. The campus was built by more than 100 local craftsmen, many of whom had been out of work since the stock market crash of 1929. The campus stretches 440 acres with main campus centered on 10 acres. There are 300 wooded acres, 15 acres of wetland, and 5 acres of tilled farmland.

Historic elements of the campus were listed on the National Register of Historic Places in 2022.

=== Academic buildings ===
- The Barn
- Center for the Advancement of Public Action
- Crossett Library
- Dickinson Science Building
- Jennings Music Building
- Deane Carriage Barn
- Stickney Observatory
- Tishman Lecture Hall
- East Academic Center Buildings
- Visual and Performing Arts Center

=== Residence halls ===
94% of students live on campus. There are 21 student houses and all dorms are co-educational. Each dorm hosts a weekly "Coffee Hour" on Sunday evenings where students discuss campus and house issues together. There are also 15 staff/faculty houses.

==== Colonial houses ====
- Bingham
- Booth
- Canfield
- Dewey
- Franklin
- Kilpatrick
- Leigh
- McCullough
- Stokes
- Swan
- Welling
- Woolley

==== Barnes houses ====
- Fels
- Noyes
- Sawtell

==== Woo houses ====
- Merck
- Paris-Borden
- Perkins

==== Other houses ====
- Longmeadow
- Welling Town House
- Shingle Cottage

=== Dining, fitness, and recreation ===
- Historic Commons Building
- Meyer Recreation Barn & Climbing Gym
- The Student Center & Snack Bar
- The Upstairs/Downstairs Cafe
- Soccer Field
- Tennis Courts
- Basketball Court
- Running and Hiking Trails

== Student life ==
In 2024, Bennington College had a total undergraduate enrollment of 785, with a gender distribution of 34 percent male students and 66 percent female students. 94 percent of the students live in college-owned, -operated, or -affiliated housing and 6 percent of students live off campus.

=== Annual events ===
Bennington has annual events.

24-Hour Play
Plays are written and performed in the span of one day.
Roll-a-rama
Roller skating in Greenwall Auditorium.
Sunfest
A day-long music festival in May.

=== Publications ===
The Silo is a student-run and produced journal of arts and letters at Bennington College. It has been published since 1943.

The Bennington Free Press is the student-run and produced newspaper of Bennington College. It has been published since 2003.

Footnotes is an academic journal created by the Student Educational Policies Committee, beginning in spring 2016.

== Notable alumni and faculty ==
=== Alumni ===
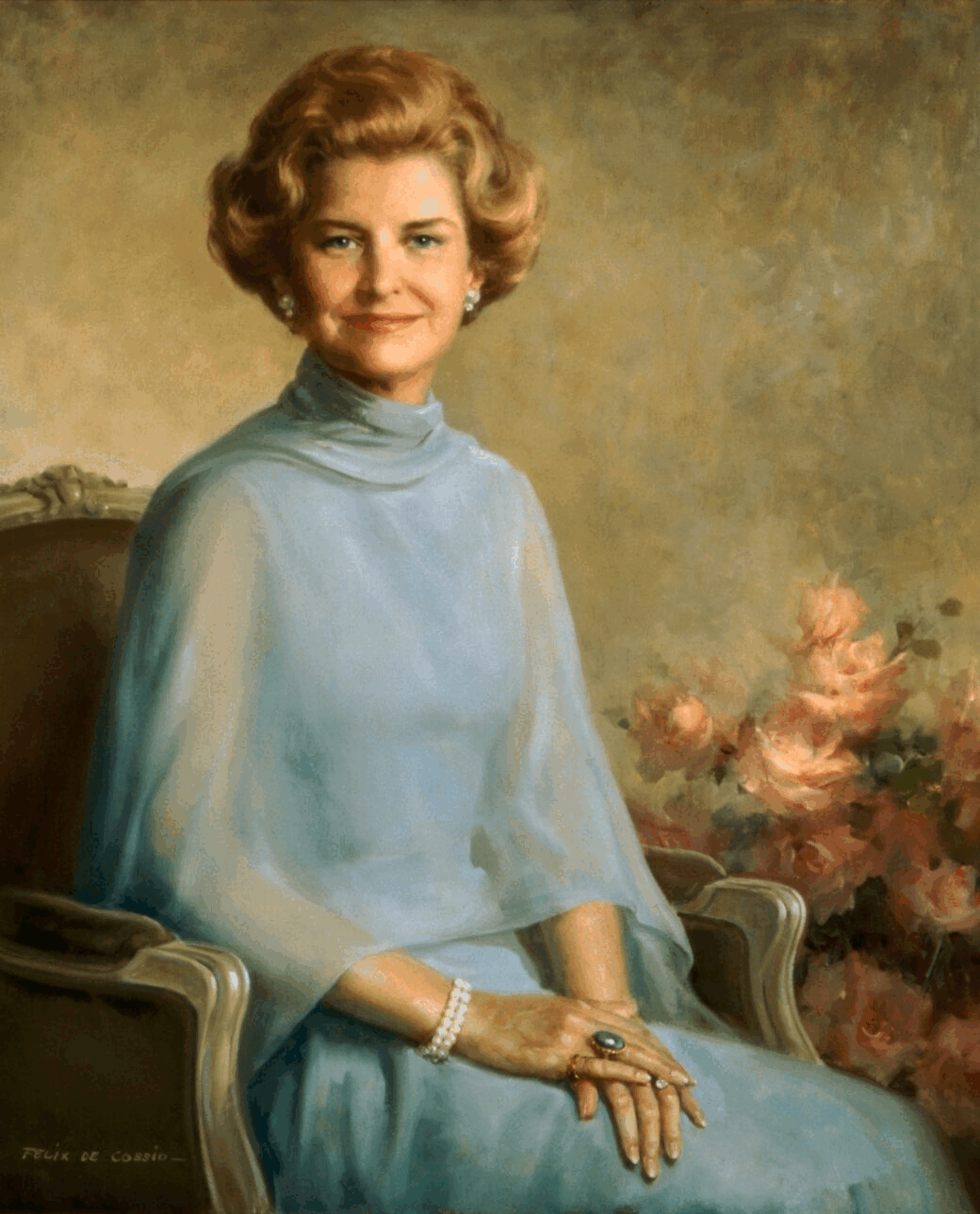
Betty Ford, Former First Lady of the United States

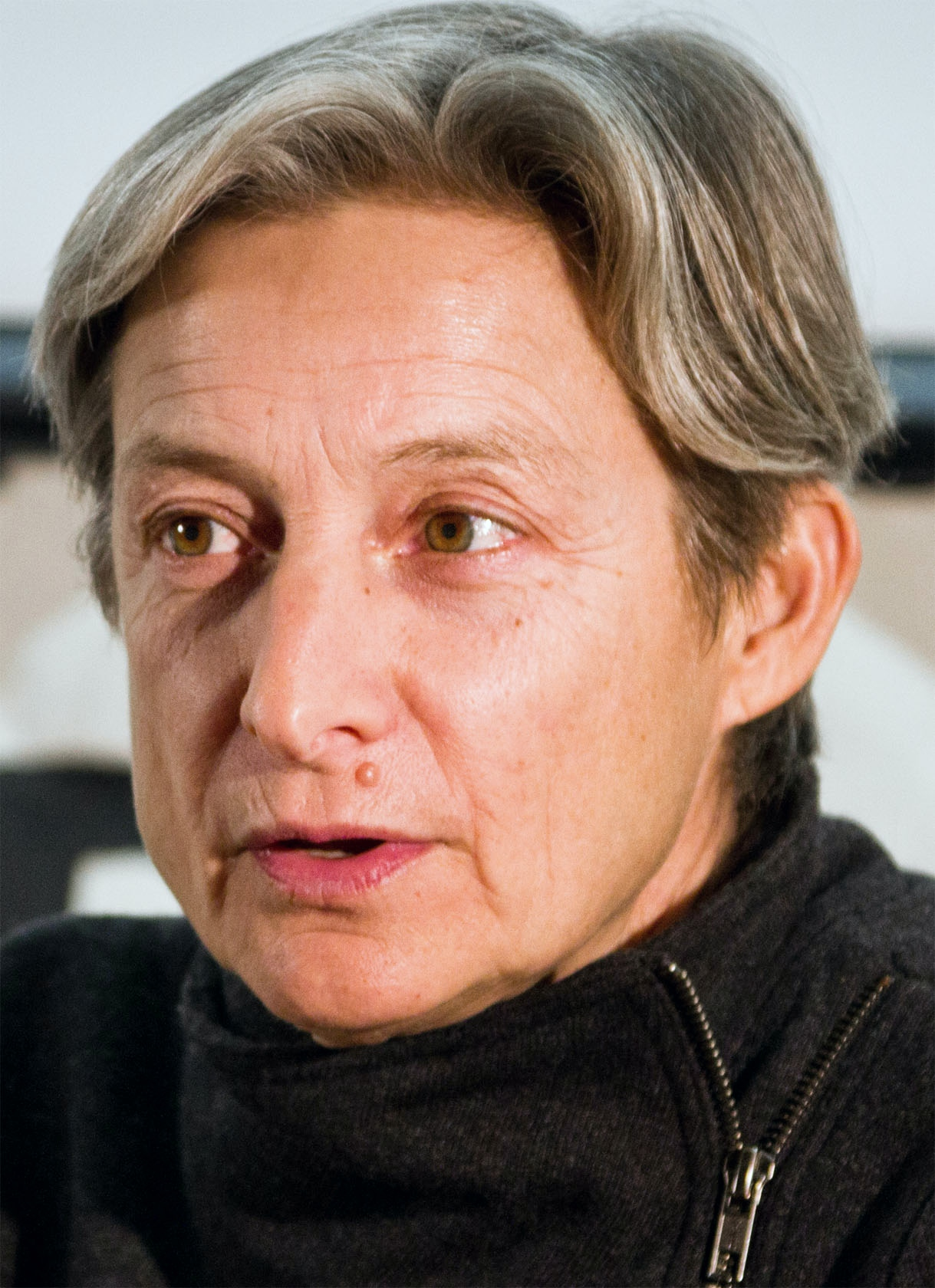
Judith Butler, Feminist theorist and philosopher

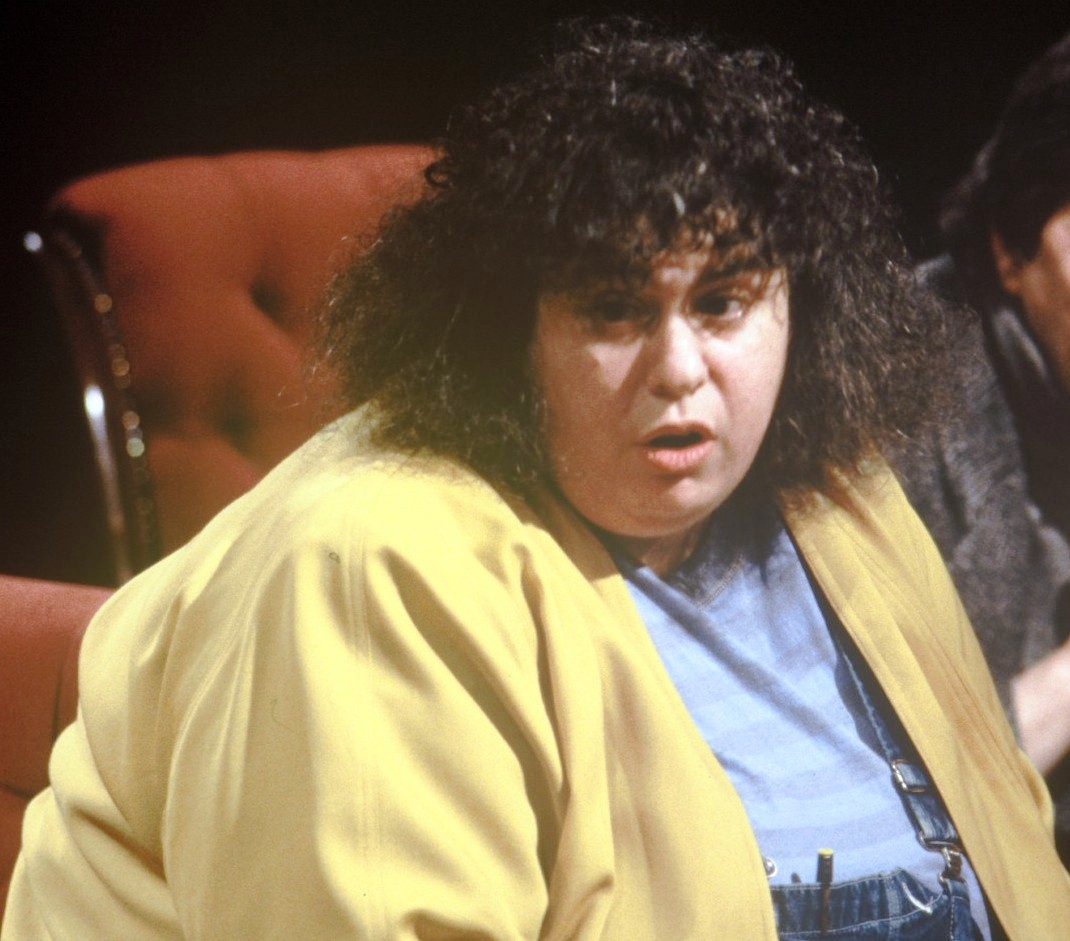
Andrea Dworkin, Feminist activist/writer

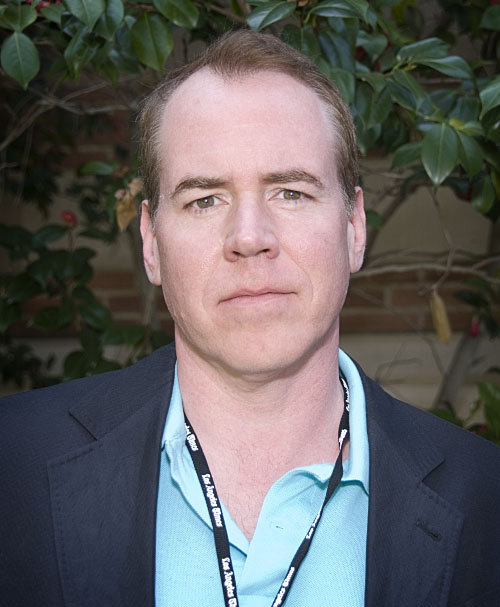
Bret Easton Ellis, Author of Less than Zero and American Psycho

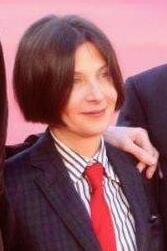
Donna Tartt, Author of The Secret History and The Goldfinch

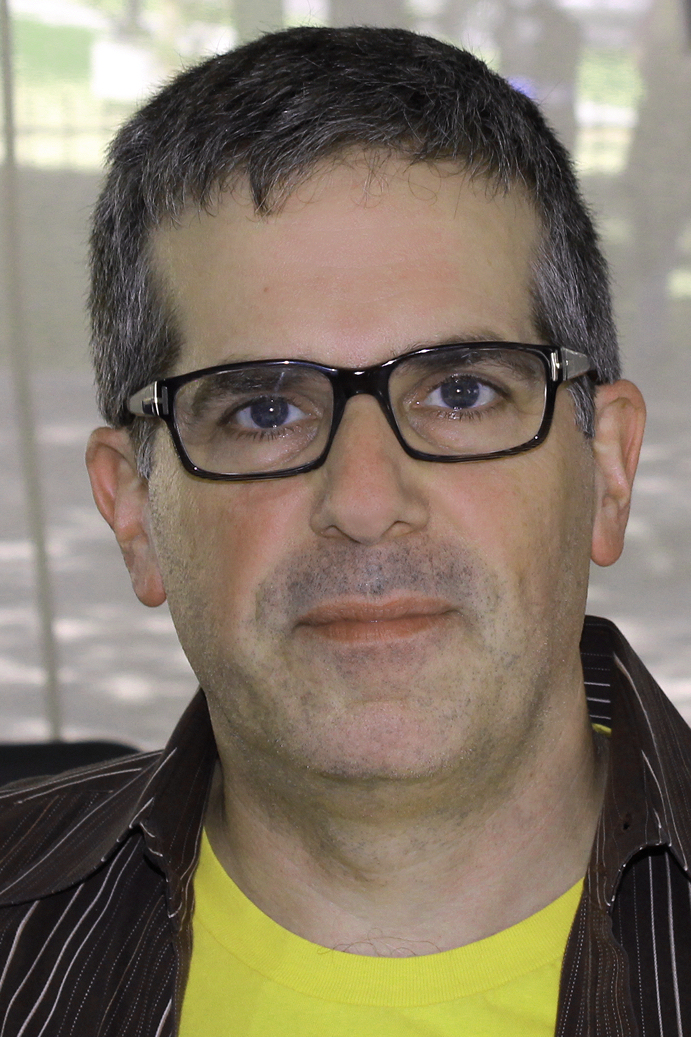
Jonathan Lethem, Author of Motherless Brooklyn and The Fortress of Solitude

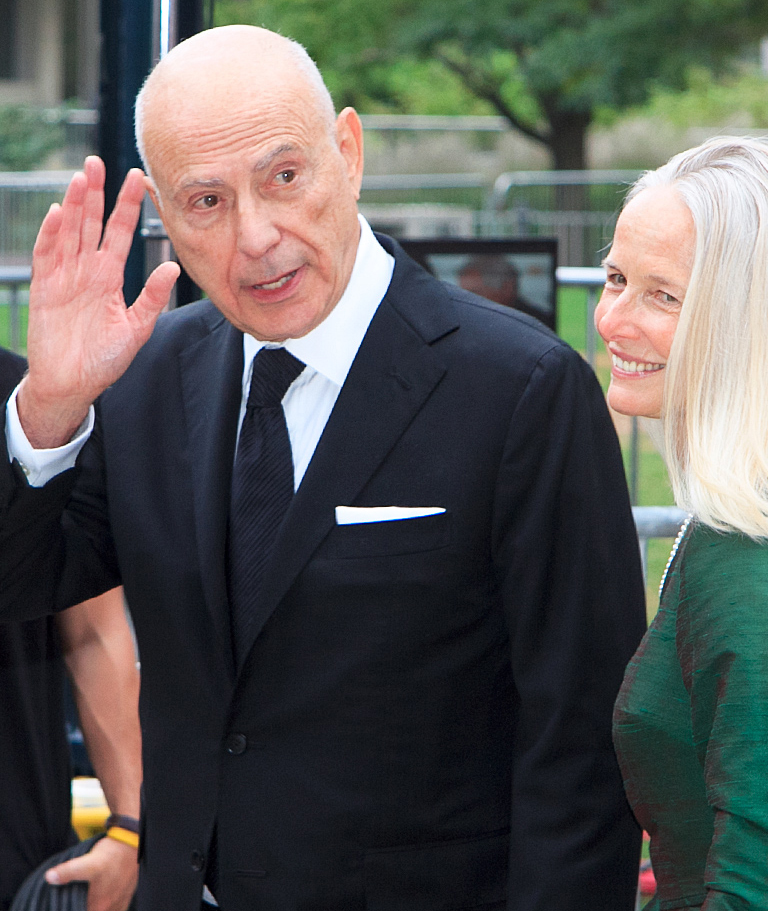
Alan Arkin, Actor

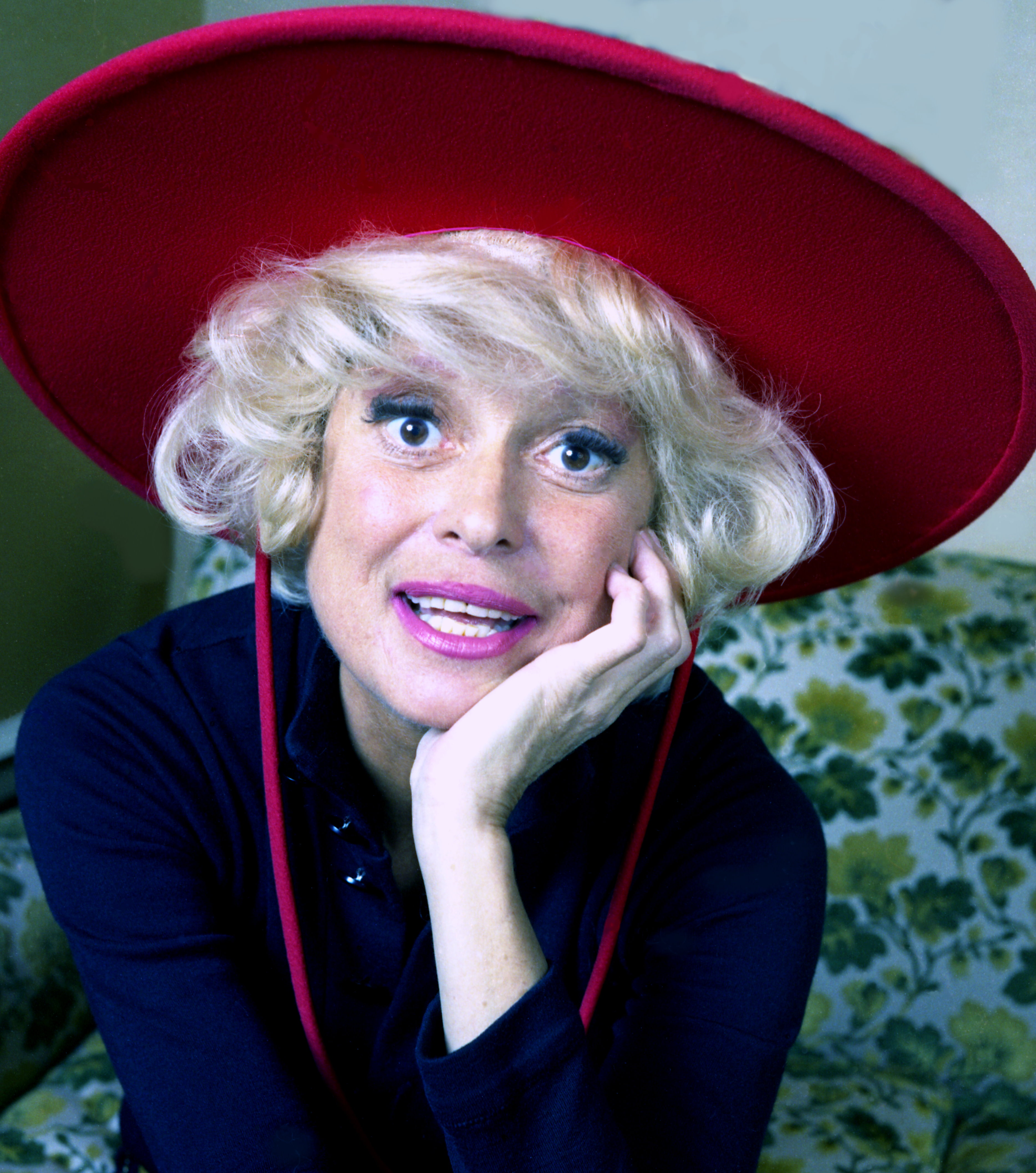
Carol Channing, Actress and comedian

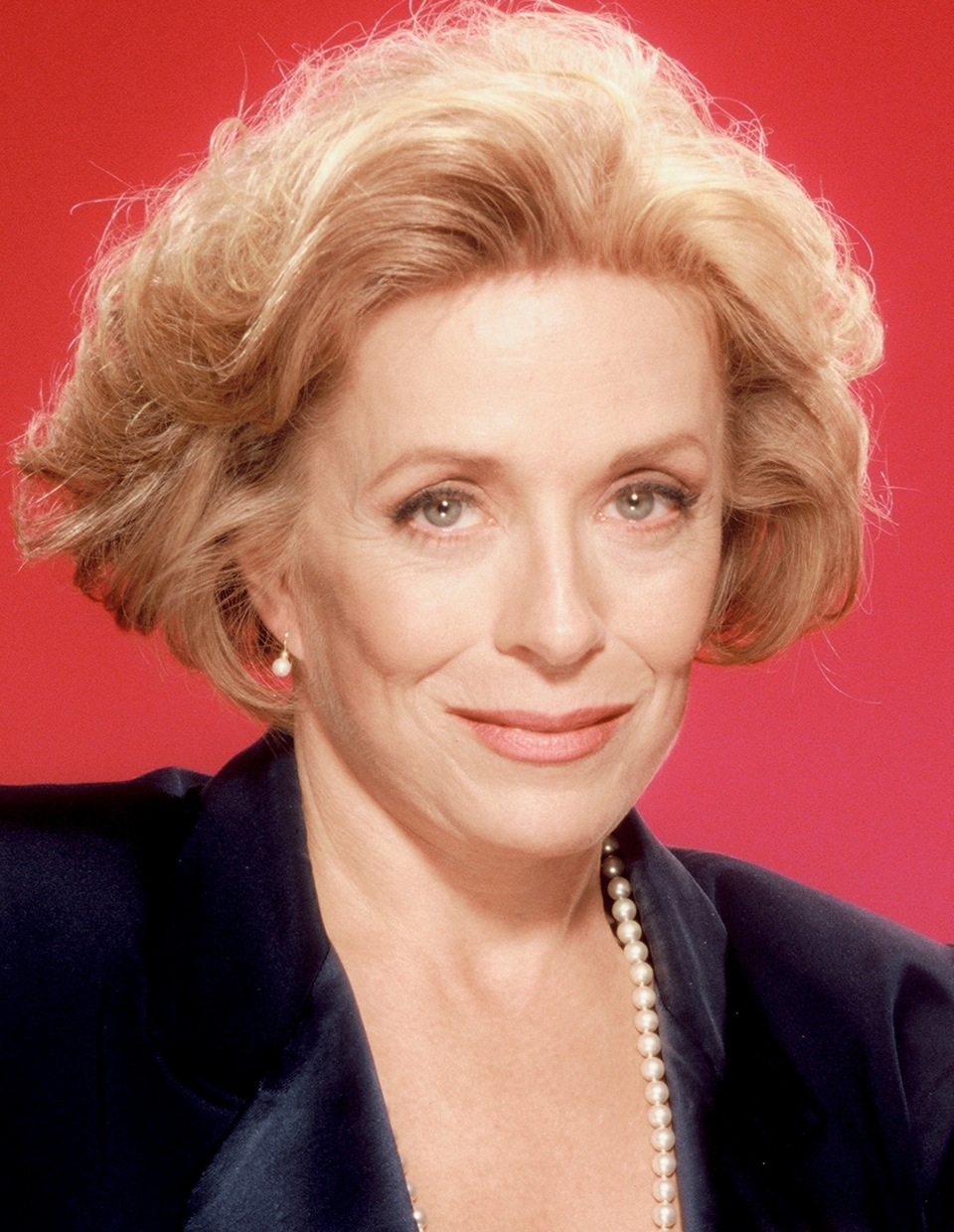
Holland Taylor, Actress

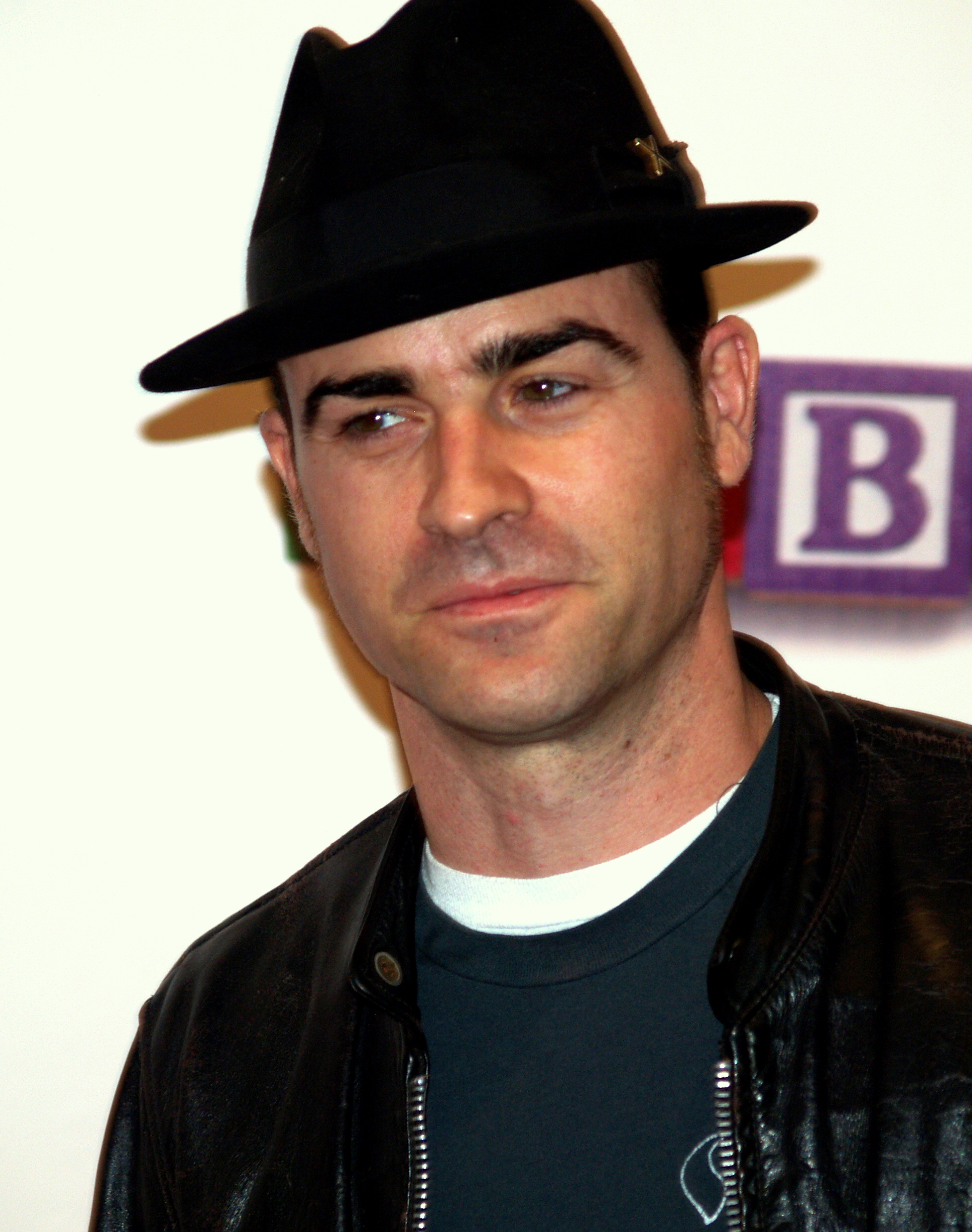
Justin Theroux, Actor

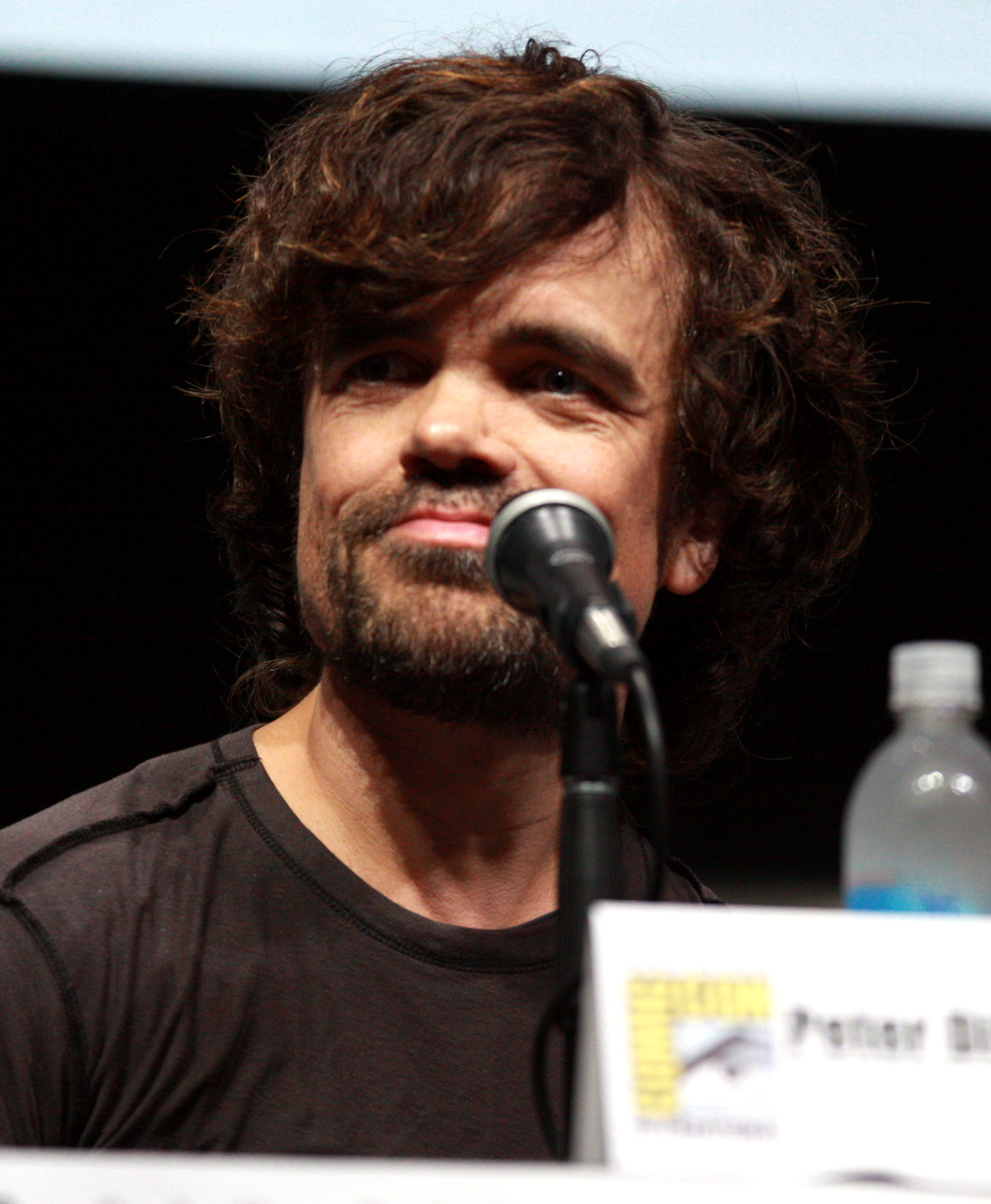
Peter Dinklage, Actor

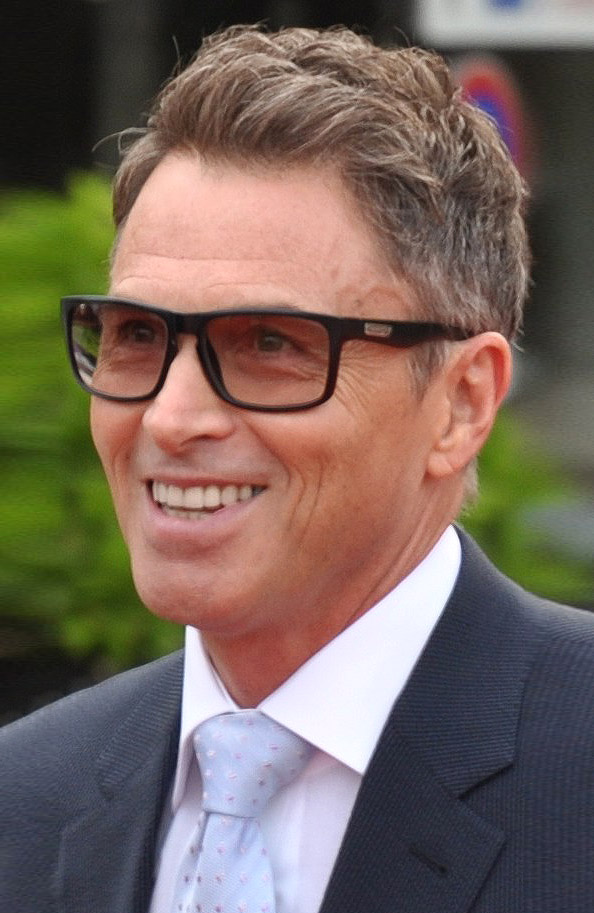
Tim Daly, Actor

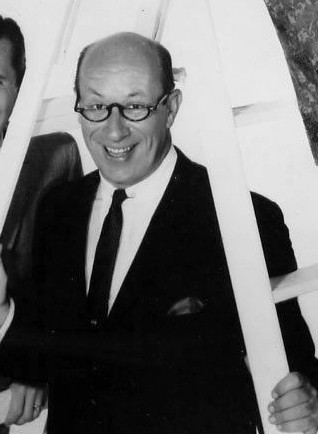
Richard Deacon, Actor

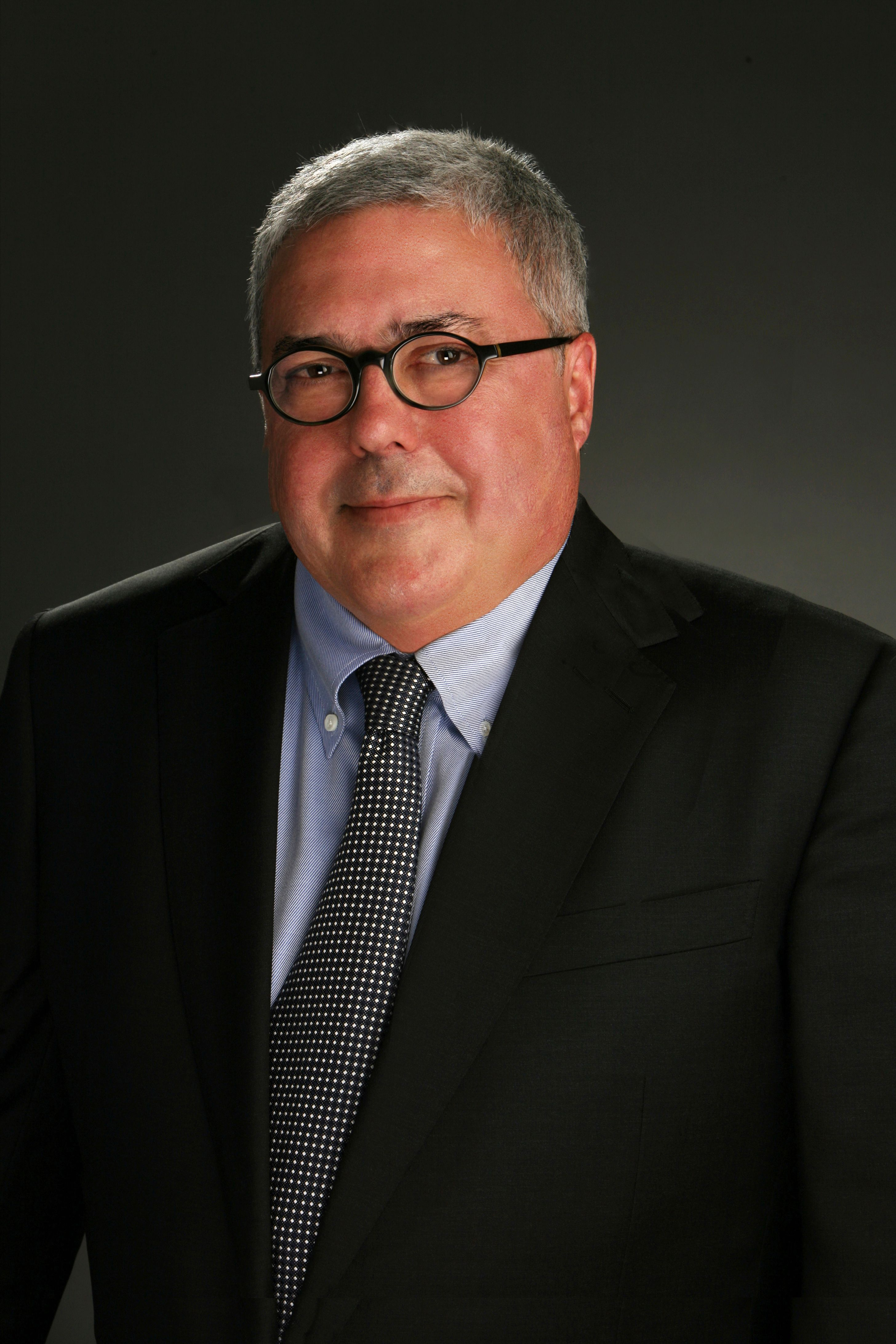
Bruce Berman, Film industry executive and producer

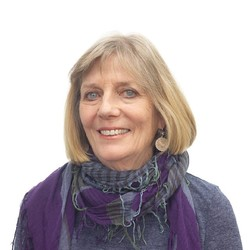
Katharine Holabird, Author of Angelina Ballerina books

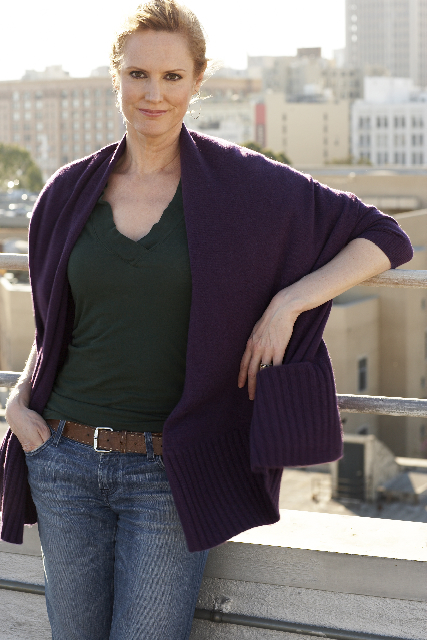
Melissa Rosenberg, Screenwriter, creator of Jessica Jones

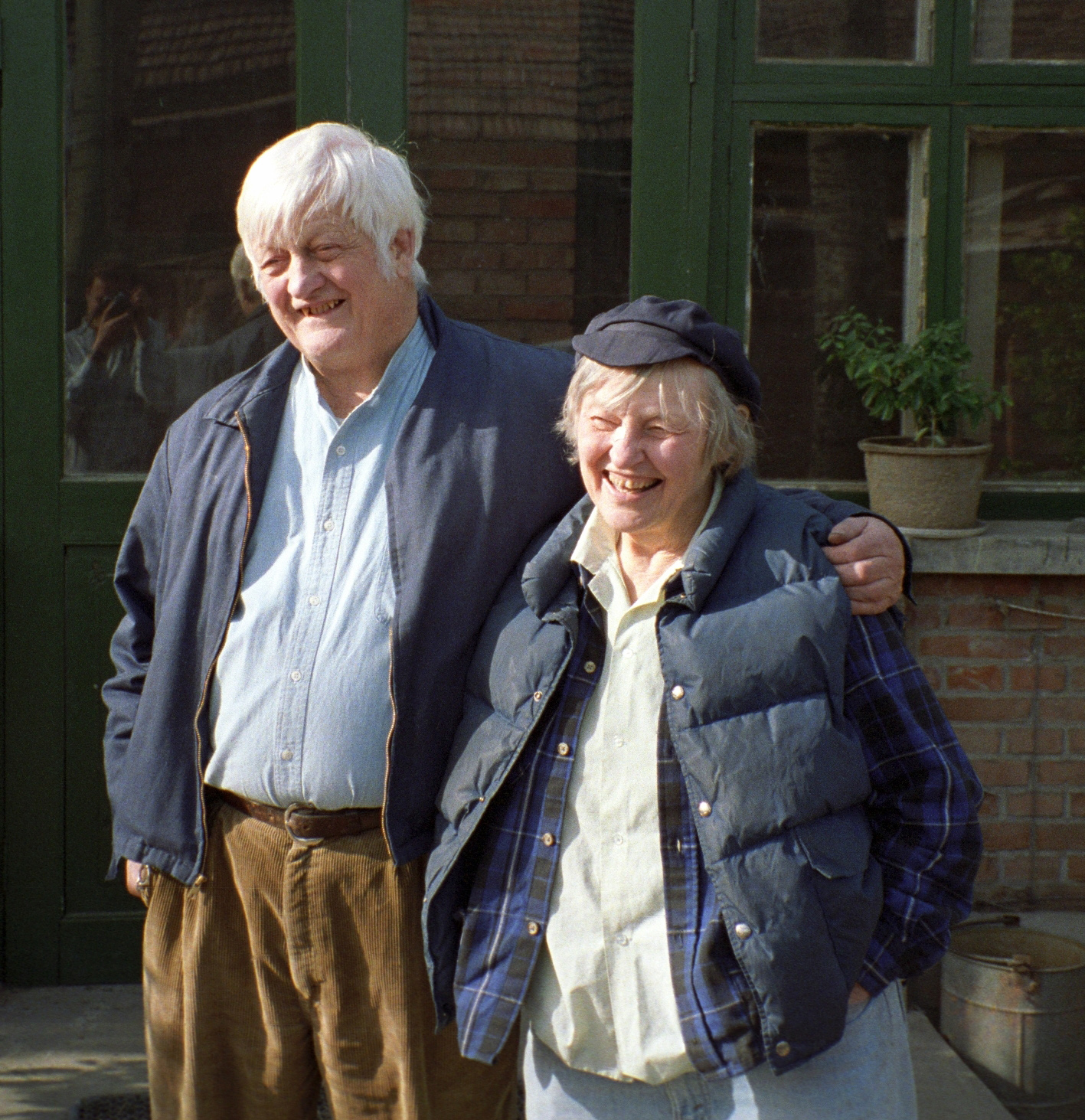
Joan Hinton, Nuclear physicist, China activist

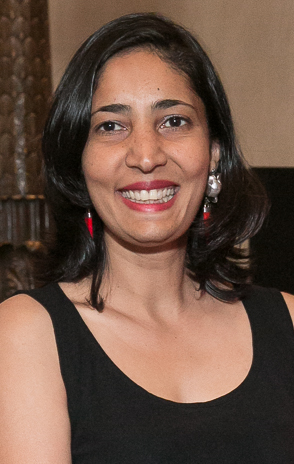
Kiran Desai, Novelist and winner of 2006 Booker Prize

=== Faculty ===
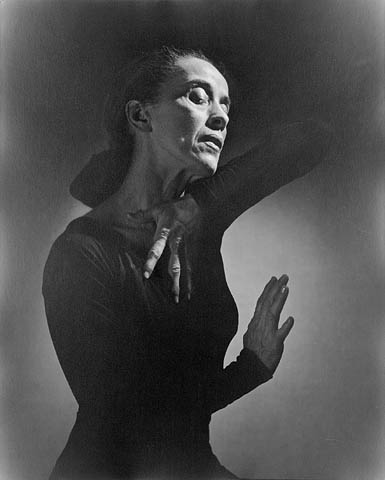
Martha Graham

Faculty has included Wharton and James biographer R. W. B. Lewis, essayist Edward Hoagland, literary critics Camille Paglia and Stanley Hyman (whose wife Shirley Jackson referenced Bennington College in her writing, particularly Hangsaman), rhetorician Kenneth Burke, former United Artists' senior vice-president Steven Bach, novelists Arturo Vivante, Bernard Malamud and John Gardner, trumpeter/composer Bill Dixon, saxophonist and pianist Charles Gayle, composers Allen Shawn, Henry Brant, and Vivian Fine, painters Kenneth Noland, Mary Lum and Jules Olitski, politicians Mansour Farhang and Mac Maharaj, poets Léonie Adams and Howard Nemerov, sculptor Anthony Caro, dancer/choreographer Martha Graham, drummer Milford Graves, author William Butler (author of The Butterfly Revolution), economist Karl Polanyi and a number of Pulitzer Prize-winning and acclaimed poets including W. H. Auden, Stanley Kunitz, Mary Oliver, Theodore Roethke, Donald Hall, and Anne Waldman, and educator Joseph S. Murphy, the future Chancellor of the City University of New York.

== Robert Frost Stone House Museum ==
In 2017, Bennington College acquired the Robert Frost Stone House Museum through a gift from the Friends of Robert Frost. Robert Frost lived in the colonial era home in Shaftsbury, Vermont, from 1920 to 1929, during which time he wrote many of his well known works including the poem "Stopping by Woods on a Snowy Evening".

Frost was involved in the founding of Bennington during the 1930s, suggesting the use of narrative evaluations which became a core aspect of the college's academic process.

== In literature ==
The college in Shirley Jackson's 1951 novel Hangsaman is said to have been inspired by Bennington College.

Camden College, a fictionalized version of Bennington, appears in the works of Bret Easton Ellis, Jill Eisenstadt, Jonathan Lethem, and Jaime Clarke. Bennington graduate Donna Tartt uses the same Bennington-inspired backdrop for her 1992 novel The Secret History, but for her it is Hampden College. However, Eisenstadt and Lethem use 'Camden' in From Rockaway (1987) and The Fortress of Solitude (2003), respectively. In Clarke's novel, Vernon Downs, the protagonist Charlie Martens attends a summer writing workshop at Camden in an effort to follow in the footsteps of the fictional writer Vernon Downs, whose portrayal is based on real-world Bennington alum Bret Easton Ellis.
