= California Library Association =

Professional association for librarians

California Library Association (CLA)
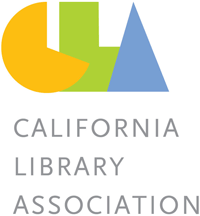
- Established: 1895; 131 years ago
- Type: Non-profit; NGO
- Location: 1055 East Colorado Boulevard, Pasadena, California
- President: Shawn Thrasher
- Vice-President: Genesis Hansen
- Past President: Gary Shaffer
- Website: www.cla-net.org

Established in 1895, the California Library Association (CLA) is a 501(c)(3) non-profit charitable organization. Members of CLA include library staff members, professional librarians, library and information science graduate students, and those individuals "interested in the development, promotion and improvement of library services" in the U.S. state of California.

== History ==
The California Library Association traces the impetus of its founding to the American Library Association (ALA) conference in 1891 in San Francisco in 1891. This was ALA's first West Coast conference. At that time, there was interest in forming a regional library association on the West Coast, because it was felt that the American Library Association's was focused more on the development of East Coast libraries. CLA was formed in 1895 at "a meeting of representatives of eight northern California libraries." This creation was spearheaded by George Clark, Arthur Jellison, and Joseph Rowell.

CLA quickly took its role of advocating for libraries in California seriously. In the early 1900s, CLA worked on collaborations and mutual support with the California State Library and State Librarian James Gillis. In 1912 the organization advocated for the building of schools, including the California State Library School, to train librarians and to expand libraries throughout the state.

At the 1914 annual meeting of the Association, it was voted to affiliate the California Library Association with the American Library Association. This gave the CLA representation within the national association's Council.

In 1941 the organization published guidelines for the roles of professional and non-professional librarians in college and university libraries.

The organization has a history of advocating against censorship, discrimination, and government interference. In 1984, the organization received national attention when it rescinded its invitation to a noted Holocaust denier and antisemite, David McCalden, to speak at their convention. "When [McCalden's] request to display his books during Banned Books Week was denied by the Torrance (California) Public Library, McCalden was invited by the California Library Association in 1984 to operate a booth and participate in a presentation at its annual conference. The uproar by both politicians and the press when this became public led the CLA to cancel McCalden's exhibit and program. McCalden sued CLA and his lawsuits were dismissed by the courts.

== Purpose ==
The organization's original focus was on traveling libraries and interlibrary loan, creation of a state library commission and state library standards, and library training and copyright depositories in the state of California. The CLA operated as the de facto state library commission promoting library services to underserved areas until the California State Library took over those roles. Currently its stated mission is to provide "leadership for the development, promotion and improvement of library services, librarianship and the library community." The organization also gives awards to programs that encourage reading and education, including the PBS show California Gold with Huell Howser.

CLA provides resources to its members and to California libraries of all types, including educational opportunities, library job listings, and advocacy efforts. Members including individual members (including library students), public and academic libraries, and library-related businesses. CLA organizes an annual conference which brings library workers and supporters together to learn and network, as well as to attend to the organizational business of the association.

== Structure ==
CLA operates according to its bylaws and standing rules. The association is managed by a board of directors, consisting of 15 members. The members are elected for a term of 3 years, and elections are conducted every year for 2 or 3 positions.

CLA partners with the California State Library to create the California Public Library Trustees Toolkit, Lunch at the Library, a program to serve lunch to children in the summers, and California Libraries Learn (CALL), continuing education for staff in public, school, special, or academic libraries in California.

== California Library Hall of Fame ==
One of the initiatives that the CLA runs in order to celebrate library history in the state and honor members is the California Library Hall of Fame. Similar to other Hall of Fame awards, anyone, member or not, who had made a notable contribution to California libraries throughout history are eligible for the award, which was established in 2012. The honorees are announced annually at the CLA conference. Additional awards, scholarships, and medals are given to particular individuals, organizations, and libraries for notable accomplishments in the California library sphere.

California Library Hall of Fame honorees with Wikipedia pages
Award Year	Name (Wikilinked)	Accomplishments	Ref.
2026	Michael Cart	Author, librarian, and president of the Young Adult Library Services Association (YALSA) and the Assembly on Literature for Adolescents of the National Council of Teachers.	
2026	Carleton Winslow		
2026	Marva DeLoach	Librarian and educator in library science studies; advocate for diversity in the field.	
2025			
2024	Joyce Madkins Sumbi		
2023	Martha Boaz		
2022	Helen E. Haines		
2022	Robert M. Hayes		
2021	Michael Buckland		
2021	Hiroshi Kashiwagi		
2020	Elizabeth Martinez		
2020	Laura Steffens Suggett		
2019	Susan H. Hildreth	The State Librarian of California from 2004-2009 and the CLA president in 2004.	
2019	Dorothea Nelson	As city librarian of the Santa Maria Public Library, supervised numerous library remodels and services.	
2018	Betty Blackman	Librarian, first African-American Dean of Libraries in the California State University system.	
2018	Rue Randall Clifford		
2018	Mabel Gillis		
2018	Andrew Smith Hallidie		
2018	Frances Burns Linn		
2017	Tessa Kelso		
2017	Effie Lee Morris		
2016	Ray Bradbury		
2016	Mary Foy		
2016	Anne Hadden		
2016	May Dexter Henshall		
2016	Rosamond Parma		
2016	Frances Clarke Sayers		
2015	Kate M. Foley		
2015	Carleton B. Joeckel		
2015	Ella Morgan		
2014	Clara Breed		
2014	Ina Coolbrith		
2014	Harriet G. Eddy		
2014	Charles Fletcher Lummis		
2013	Essae Martha Culver		
2013	Adelaide Hasse		
2013	Huell Howser		
2013	Ida M. Reagan		
2013	Gretchen Knief Schenk		
2013	Kevin Starr		
2013	Althea Warren		
2013	William Henry Weeks	Architect	
2012	James Louis Gillis	The President of the CLA (1906-1916).	
2012	Zoia Horn	Librarian, peace activist, and advocate of intellectual freedom.	
2012	Carma Leigh	State Librarian of California from 1951-1972.	
2012	Miriam Matthews	Librarian, art collector, and the first certified African-American librarian in California.	
2012	Regina Minudri	Librarian, library advocate, and 1986-1987 president of the American Library Association.	
2012	Lawrence Clark Powell	Library director and 1949-1950 California Library Association president.	

== See also ==
- List of libraries in the United States
- List of library associations in the United States
