= California State Depository Library Program =

Government program to make California government documents freely available to the public

The California State Depository Library Program is a materials distribution program administered by the California State Library with the goal of making documents published by the California state government available to all California residents. Participating libraries are obliged to keep physical copies of distributed materials and make them available to patrons at no cost until such materials are authorized to be discarded by the California State Library.

== History and structure of program ==
The program was authorized by the California Legislature in the 1945 Library Distribution Act and is codified in the California Government Code. By law, California government agencies must send two copies of all publications they release to the California State Archivist. Such publications include "any document, compilation, journal, law, resolution, Blue Book, statute, code, register, pamphlet, list, book, report, memorandum, hearing, legislative bill, leaflet, order, regulation, directory, periodical, or magazine, in physical or electronic format," issued by the state government or prepared for the state government by independent third parties.

Municipal public libraries, public college and university libraries, and private college and university libraries are eligible apply to participate in the program. Institutions applying to participate in the program attest to be able to provide "adequate facilities for the storage and use of the publications" and make them accessible to patrons at no cost. A "complete depository" receives one copy of every physical state publication, while a "selective depository" receives one copy of physical state publications from agencies selected by the library.

Law libraries affiliated with courts or law schools may also apply to participate in the program, with such institutions' participation also requiring the maintenance of "basic legal documents," which include "legislative bills, legislative committee hearings and reports, legislative journals, statutes, administrative reports, California Administrative Code and Register, annual reports of state agencies and other legal materials published by the state."

== List of participating libraries ==
As of September 2021, 102 libraries participate in the distribution program: 15 complete depositories and 87 selective depositories.

Institution	Type	City	Complete?
Alhambra Public Library	Public library	Alhambra, CA	No
Humboldt State University Library	College library	Arcata, CA	No
Walter W. Stiern Library	College library	Bakersfield, CA	No
Kern County Law Library	Law library	Bakersfield, CA	No
Kern County Library System	Public library	Bakersfield, CA	No
Berkeley School of Law Library	College law library	Berkeley, CA	No
Doe Library	College library	Berkeley, CA	Yes
California State University, Dominguez Hills Library	College library	Carson, CA	No
Meriam Library	College library	Chico, CA	Yes
Chula Vista Public Library	Public library	Chula Vista, CA	No
Claremont Colleges Honnold/Mudd Library	College library	Claremont, CA	No
UC Davis Mabie Law Library	College law library	Davis, CA	No
UC Davis Shields Library	College library	Davis, CA	Yes
El Centro Public Library	Public library	El Centro, CA	No
Humboldt County Library	Public library	Eureka, CA	No
Fremont Main Library	Public library	Fremont, CA	No
Fresno County Public Library	Public library	Fresno, CA	Yes
Henry Madden Library	College library	Fresno, CA	No
Pollak Library	College library	Fullerton, CA	No
Orange County Public Library	Public library	Garden Grove, CA	No
Kings County Law Library	Law library	Hanford, CA	No
California State University, East Bay	College library	Hayward, CA	No
Inglewood Public Library	Public library	Inglewood, CA	No
University of California, Irvine	College library	Irvine, CA	No
Lancaster Library	Public library	Lancaster, CA	No
Geisel Library	College library	La Jolla, CA	Yes
California State University, Long Beach	College library	Long Beach, CA	No
Long Beach Public Library	Public library	Long Beach, CA	No
Los Angeles County Law Library	Law library	Los Angeles, CA	No
John F. Kennedy Memorial Library	College library	Los Angeles, CA	No
Court of Appeal Library, Second Appellate District	Law library	Los Angeles, CA	No
Los Angeles Central Library	Public library	Los Angeles, CA	Yes
Southwestern Law School Library	College law library	Los Angeles, CA	No
Hugh & Hazel Darling Law Library	College law library	Los Angeles, CA	No
Charles E. Young Research Library	College library	Los Angeles, CA	Yes
Von KleinSmid Library	College library	Los Angeles, CA	No
University of Southern California Law School Library	College law library	Los Angeles, CA	No
Stanislaus County Library	Public library	Modesto, CA	No
Napa City-County Library	Public library	Napa, CA	No
Delmar T. Oviatt Library	College library	Northridge, CA	No
Norwalk Regional Library	Public library	Norwalk, CA	No
Oakland Public Library	Public library	Oakland, CA	No
University of La Verne College of Law Library	College law library	Ontario, CA	No
Butte County Library	Public library	Oroville, CA	No
Pasadena Public Library	Public library	Pasadena, CA	No
Contra Costa County Library	Public library	Pleasant Hill, CA	No
California State Polytechnic University, Pomona Library	College library	Pomona, CA	No
Shasta Public Libraries, Redding Library	Public library	Redding, CA	No
A.K. Smiley Public Library	Public library	Redlands, CA	No
Redwood City Public Library	Public library	Redwood City, CA	No
San Mateo County Law Library	Law library	Redwood City, CA	No
Riverside County Law Library	Law library	Riverside, CA	No
Rivera Library	College library	Riverside, CA	No
California State Archives	State archives	Sacramento, CA	Yes
California State Library	State library	Sacramento, CA	Yes
California State University, Sacramento Library	College library	Sacramento, CA	No
Gordon D. Schaber Law Library	College law library	Sacramento, CA	No
Sacramento County Public Law Library	Law library	Sacramento, CA	No
Sacramento Central Library	Public library	Sacramento, CA	No
John M. Pfau Library	College library	San Bernardino	No
San Bernardino County Law Library	Law library	San Bernardino	No
Samuel E. Andrews Library	College library	San Bernardino	No
California Western School of Law	College law library	San Diego, CA	No
San Diego County Public Law Library	Law library	San Diego, CA	No
San Diego Central Library	Public library	San Diego, CA	No
Malcolm A. Love Library (San Diego State University)	College library	San Diego, CA	Yes
University of San Diego Legal Research Center	College law library	San Diego, CA	No
California Judicial Center Library	Law library	San Francisco, CA	No
Golden Gate University Law Library	College law library	San Francisco, CA	No
San Francisco Public Library	Public library	San Francisco, CA	Yes
J. Paul Leonard Library	College library	San Francisco, CA	No
Hastings College of Law Library	College law library	San Francisco, CA	No
Zief Law Library	College law library	San Francisco, CA	No
Dr. Martin Luther King Jr. Library	College library	San Jose, CA	Yes
Santa Clara County Law Library	Law library	San Jose, CA	No
San Luis Obispo City-County Library	Public library	San Luis Obispo, CA	No
San Luis Obispo County Law Library	Law library	San Luis Obispo, CA	No
Kellogg Library	College library	San Marcos, CA	No
San Mateo Public Library	Public library	San Mateo, CA	No
Orange County Public Law Library	Law library	Santa Ana, CA	No
Santa Barbara County Law Library	Law library	Santa Barbara, CA	No
Santa Barbara Public Library	Public library	Santa Barbara, CA	No
Davidson Library	College library	Santa Barbara, CA	Yes
Santa Clara University Orradre Library	College library	Santa Barbara, CA	No
Santa Cruz County Law Library	Law library	Santa Cruz, CA	No
Santa Cruz Public Library	Public library	Santa Cruz, CA	No
McHenry Library	College library	Santa Cruz, CA	No
Santa Maria Public Library	Public library	Santa Maria, CA	No
Santa Monica Public Library	Public library	Santa Monica, CA	No
Sonoma County Law Library	Law library	Santa Rosa, CA	No
Sonoma County Public Library	Public library	Santa Rosa, CA	No
Monterey County Free Libraries	Public library	Seaside, CA	No
Green Library	College library	Stanford, CA	Yes
San Joaquin County Law Library	Law library	Stockton, CA	No
Stockton/San Joaquin County Public Library	Public library	Stockton, CA	No
Thousand Oaks Library	Public library	Thousand Oaks, CA	No
California State University, Stanislaus Library	College library	Turlock, CA	No
Ventura County Law Library	Law library	Ventura, CA	No
Library of Congress	National library	Washington, D.C.	Yes

== See also ==
- California State Library
