= Betty Blackman =

- Born: Betty Joan Blackman; October 7, 1931; Yellow Springs, Ohio, USA
- Died: October 4, 2022 (aged 90); Inglewood, California, USA
- Education: Ohio State University (BA) Western Michigan University (MLS)
- Occupation: Librarian

Betty Joan Blackman (October 7, 1931 – October 4, 2022) was an American librarian whose passion for empowering library workers led her to significant leadership positions at academic library systems. She was the first African-American dean of libraries in the California State University System, and a life-long supporter of library workers. She was inducted into the California Library Hall of Fame in 2018, and is memorialized in the California Library Leader History Project through the California State Library.

== Education and career ==
Betty Blackman received her bachelor's degree from Ohio State University and her Master of Arts in Library Science from Western Michigan University. She was a member of the Zeta Phi Beta Sorority.

Her first library position was at the Wright-Patterson Air Force Base library. In 1965, she moved to California and worked at the Long Beach library with the California State University (CSU) until 1979, when she became the library director of the Loyola Marymount University Library. She left the position in 1986 to take up the position of Dean of Libraries at California State University, Dominguez Hills, where she remained until retiring in 1999. Throughout all of these positions, Blackman was active in many professional organizations, including the Black Caucus of the American Library Association and the California Librarians Black Caucus, Southern Section. Within the California Library Association, she served as a council member and the chair of the Academic Research Libraries chapter. Within the American Library Association council, she was the CLA's representative and advocate, as well as a participant and leader in many other committees.

Blackman received the BCALA's Leadership Award in 1994, and certifications of merit from the California Librarians Black Caucus, Southern Section.

Blackman held her positions during important times of change, both on the national scale during the US civil rights era and on the scale of her individual universities, as Loyola Marymount University became more co-ed, secular, and adjusted to an expanded scope of identity as a religious university.

In 2014, Blackman was interviewed for the California Library Leader History Project, and described her experiences and career. The California Library Leader History Project was an oral history project run by the California State Library.

In 2018, Blackman was inducted into the California Library Hall of Fame for her accomplishments in library leadership positions and historical standing as the first African American women to hold many of her positions.

She retired in 1999 and continued to participate in library associations and act as a mentor to librarians and library workers.

== Personal life ==
Betty Joan Blackman was African-American and was born in Yellow Springs, Ohio. She performed as a stand-up comic, notably during a period of her life where she was also caring for her mother.

She passed away on October 4, 2022, in Inglewood, California.
