= James Gillis =

James Gillis may refer to:

- James Lisle Gillis (1792–1881), Democratic member of the U.S. House of Representatives from Pennsylvania
- James Louis Gillis (1857–1917), American librarian
- James Gillis (bishop) (1802–1864), Roman Catholic bishop in Scotland
- James Henry Gillis (1831–1910), rear admiral in the United States Navy
- Jim Gillis (golfer), see Maine Open

== See also ==
- James Melville Gilliss (1811–1865), astronomer, United States Navy officer and founder of the United States Naval Observatory
- Jamie Gillis (1943–2010), American pornographic actor
