= Suggett =

Suggett is a surname. Notable people with the surname include:

- Colin Suggett (born 1948), English football player and manager
- Bob Suggett (1911–1982), Australian politician
- Laura Steffens Suggett (1874–1946), American librarian
