= Laura Steffens Suggett =

American librarian (1874–1946)

- Laura Steffens Suggett, an undated portrait, from a 2009 publication
- Born: Laura Steffens; June 18, 1874; Sacramento, California
- Died: February 6, 1946 (aged 71); California
- Occupation: Librarian
- Relatives: Lincoln Steffens (brother)

Laura Steffens Suggett (June 18, 1874 – February 6, 1946) was an American librarian. She was inducted into the California Library Hall of Fame in 2020.

== Early life and education ==
Laura Steffens was born in Sacramento, California, the daughter of Joseph Steffens and Elizabeth Louisa Symes Steffens. Her father was a prominent banker, born in Canada; her mother was born in England. Her brother was writer Lincoln Steffens. The Steffens home in Sacramento, where she lived as a teenager, became the California governor's mansion in 1903. She graduated from Stanford University in 1896. with further studies in Leipzig.

== Career ==
The California State Library appointed Steffens as chief of the state library's extension service in 1903, and she was tasked with creating a traveling library for rural Californians. She founded and edited the journal News Notes of California Libraries. She moved to San Francisco in 1917 to run the Sutro Library there. She chaired the Conditions of Librarians Committee of the California Library Association. She proposed a "morgue for dead manuscripts", offering to house two copies of authors' works: the manuscript they produced, and the published edition, as an "invaluable historical record". She left the Sutro in 1923.

Suggett published The Beginning and the End of the Best Library Service in the World (1924), a "melodramatic account" of her work with the State Library Extension Service, and The California Library Service (1925). Upton Sinclair promoted her 1924 book in his newspaper column, saying "Mrs. Suggett's book gives the details of this plan, and you see what a beautiful and loving and generous and civilized thing it was."

== Personal life ==
In 1909, Steffens made news when she injured her eye in a "novel" pencil-sharpening accident at the library. In 1918, Laura Steffens married dentist and college professor Allen Holman Suggett, her sister's widower. She "suffered a mental breakdown" in the early 1930s, and saw Carl Jung in Zürich for treatment. She died in 1946, aged 71. In 2020, she was inducted into the California Library Hall of Fame.
