= Sumbi =

Sumbi is a surname. Notable people with the surname include:

- Joyce Sumbi (1935–2010), African-American librarian
- Dayang Sumbi, mother of Sangkuriang in Indonesian legend
