= Susan H. Hildreth =

American librarian

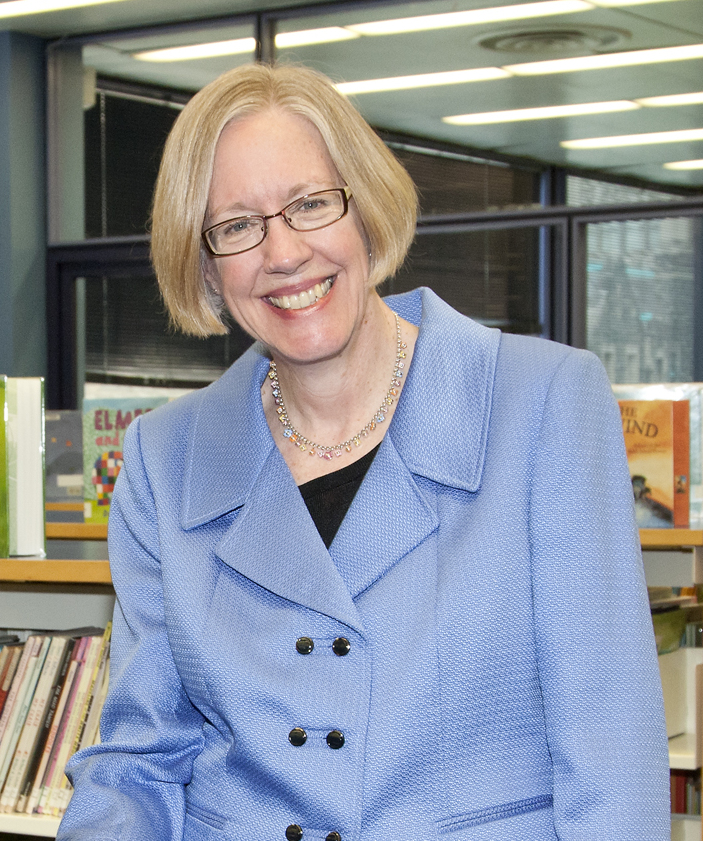
- Born: 1951
- Education: Syracuse University, University at Albany, Rutgers University, Herkimer High School
- Occupation: Librarian, university teacher, administrator
- Employer: Benicia Public Library; Califa Group; Placer County Library; Yolo County Library; California State Library (2004–2009); Institute of Museum and Library Services (2011–2015); Peninsula Library System; Sacramento Public Library; San Francisco Public Library (–2004); Seattle Public Library (2009–2010); Sonoma County Library; University of Washington Information School (2016–2018)
- Awards: California Library Hall of Fame (2019)
- Position held: State Librarian of California (2004–2009), director (2011–2015), treasurer (2016–2019), president (2006–2007)

Susan H. Hildreth is an American librarian, administrator, and educator who has led numerous libraries and library agencies in addition to teaching at the University of Washington Information School. Between 2011 and 2015 she served as the director of the Institute of Museum and Library Services (IMLS), the principal US federal funding agency for libraries and museums.

== Career ==
Hildreth began her career at the Edison Township Library in Edison, New Jersey. Moving to California, she worked at the Yolo County Library, before becoming director of the Benicia Public Library in 1984. She also worked for the Placer County Library and Sacramento Public Library before becoming director of the San Francisco Public Library in 2001. Hildreth served as director of SFPL until 2004. On July 16, 2004, Hildreth was appointed as State Librarian of California by Governor Arnold Schwarzenegger. As State Librarian, she managed an annual budget of over $88 million in state and federal funds.

In 2009, Hildreth left California to become director of the Seattle Public Library. Her tenure at SPL was short-lived as she was appointed by President Barack Obama to serve as director of IMLS in 2011. She was nominated to the position in 2010, and her appointment was unanimously confirmed by the U.S. Senate on December 22, 2010. She was sworn into office on February 24, 2011, by Supreme Court Justice Stephen G. Breyer. During her four-year term at IMLS, Hildreth oversaw an annual budget of $250M; the agency awarded over $850M to US libraries and museums.

When her tenure at IMLS ended in 2015, she briefly returned to California before becoming the first "professor of practice" at the University of Washington Information School.

Hildreth is currently a library consultant. She has recently served as the interim executive director of the Sonoma County Public Library.

=== Association service ===
She served as the president of the California Library Association (CLA) in 2004.

She was the 2006-2007 president of the Public Library Association, the largest professional association supporting nearly 10,000 public library professionals in the US and Canada.

Between 2016 and 2019, Hildreth was the Treasurer for the American Library Association.

== Awards ==
Hildreth received the first annual California Library Association Member of the Year award in 1993.

In 2016, Hildreth was named as the winner of the Internet2 Richard Rose Award for contributions throughout her career to bringing broadband connectivity to citizens through libraries.

In 2019, she was inducted into the California Library Hall of Fame.

== Education ==
Hildreth graduated cum laude from Syracuse University in 1972. She holds a master's degree in Library Science from the State University of New York at Albany in 1973, as well as a master's degree in Business Administration from Rutgers University.
