= William S. Hebbard =

American architect

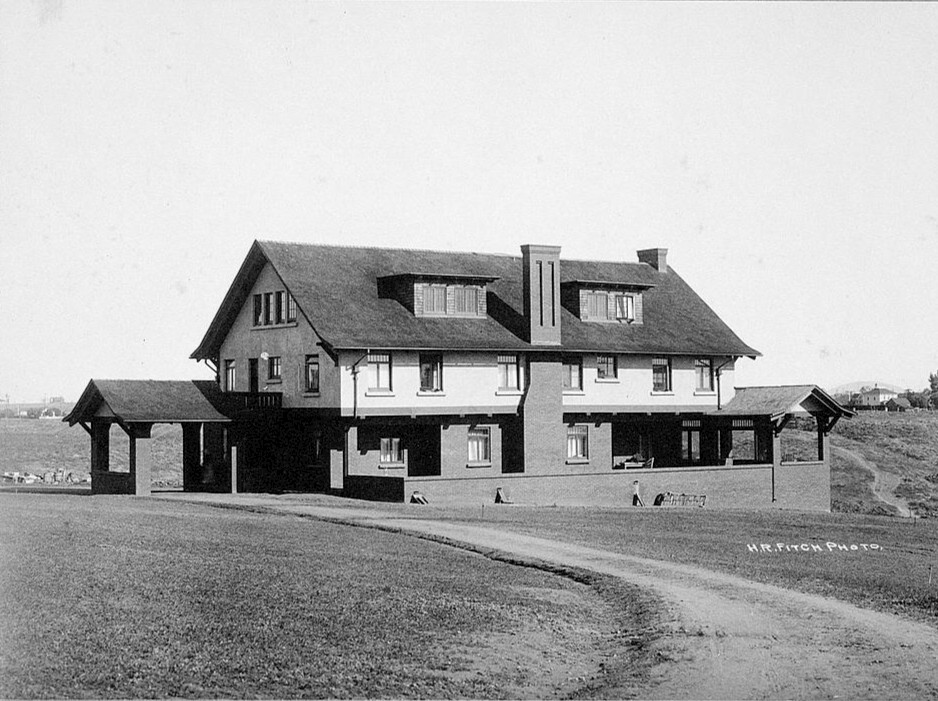
The George W. Marston House, designed by William S. Hebbard and Irving Gill, soon after its construction in 1904.

William Sterling Hebbard (1863–1930) was an American architect most noted for his work in San Diego County, California.

Hebbard briefly worked as a draftsman and assistant for the firm, Burnham and Root in Chicago, and in 1888 for Curlett, Eisen & Cuthbertson in Los Angeles. By 1890, he was in private practice in San Diego. In 1891, he became associated with the Reid Brothers firm, noted designers of the Hotel Del Coronado and took over their San Diego projects when that firm moved to San Francisco. In 1898, he formed a well known partnership with Irving Gill. The Hebbard & Gill firm arguably produced San Diego's best architecture until its breakup in 1907.

Hebbard produced work in an eclectic variety of styles, including Richarsonian Romantic, Mission Revival, Arts and Crafts, Tudor Revival and Cubist Modern. He is most regarded for his designs for private residences, but also did work on commercial structures. During World War I, he entered the Army Transport Service and worked until 1922 as a design consultant for military shipbuilding. After his service with the Army, he moved to Los Angeles and practiced architecture sporadically until his death in August, 1930.

== Early life ==
Born in Milford, Michigan, April 16, 1863, Hebbard spent his early years in Michigan and then attended prep school in Rochester, New York. In 1887, Hebbard graduated from Cornell's School of Architecture.

== Notable projects ==
- 1890 Powerhouse for San Diego Cable Railway Company (demolished)
- 1890 Pavilion at Mission Cliff Garden (demolished)
- 1898 State Normal School (with Irving Gill, demolished)
- 1893 City of Ramona Town Hall
- 1894 Jesse Grant Residence, Sixth Avenue by the Park, colonial design
- 1894 U.S. Grant, Jr. House, also known as Aloha Ranch - Dutch Colonial Revival, 5771 Sweetwater Road, Bonita
- 1894 Jessie Root Grant residence for the son of President U.S. Grant (demolished)
- 1894 Christ Episcopal Church, 1114 9th Street, Coronado
- 1900 Helped stabilize the ruins of the San Diego Mission, for the Landmarks Club
- 1901-02 Bartlett Richards residence, Coronado - 1979 Showcase Home, San Diego Historical Society
- 1902 El Cajon Presbyterian Church (demolished)
- 1904 George W. Marston House (with Gill, now a museum)
- 1911 Carnegie Library, National City - Classical Revival style; opened 1911, demolished 1955
- 1912 All Saints Episcopal Church, San Diego (with Carleton Monroe Winslow)
- 1913 Sefton Hotel, 630 F Street, for banker Joseph Sefton, Jr. (Maryland Hotel, 1916; Ivy Hotel, 2006; Andaz San Diego; address has been renumbered to 600 F Street.)
- 1915 Baker House, Coronado, also known as 'Seashore' a grand oceanfront estate, 519 Ocean Blvd.
