= Ida M. Reagan =

First ever librarian of the Butte County Free Library

Ida M. Reagan (September 12, 1875 – February 19, 1971) was the first librarian of the Butte County Free Library. She was inducted into the California Library Hall of Fame in 2013.

== Early life ==
Ida M. Reagan was born near Oroville, California, on September 12, 1875, the daughter of George Washington Reagan (1828–1908) and Susan Caroline Martin (184–1936).

== Career ==
Ida M. Reagan was the first librarian of the Butte County Free Library, Butte County, California. The Butte County Free Library was established in November 1913

In 1927 she was awarded a life certificate as librarian in the State of California. The certificate was the first of its kind ever to be issued and only librarians who have had nine years experience, or more, as a county librarian were eligible for it.

In 1935 she donated to the library a small group of rare California historical volumes, some out of print and others from limited reprints of old volumes, and housed them in the Butte County Library. Reagan collected the volumes for five years, but was able to find only a dozen books. Because of their value and the difficulty of replacing them, no one was permitted to take them from the library. Included were the "Shirley Letters", the missive of Dame Shirley, written at Rich Bar, in Plumas County, in 1851, and containing valuable information of the period. Other books were: the "City of Six" by Canfield, "The Diary of a 49er" also by Canfield, a history of the Donner Party, the Diary of Sutter, a book on the life of Joaquim Murieta, two books on the Mill Creek Indians, one by Sheriff Bob Anderson, Sr.

In 1937 she was elected first vice-president of the California Librarians Association.

She was interested in civic and club affairs.

She was a member of the Eureka Woman's Club, Business and Professional Women's Club, Daughters of the American Revolution.

She edited the Index to George D. Mansfield's History of Butte County, California, with biographical sketches of the leading men and women of the county who have been identified with its growth and development from the early days to the present, published by the Historic Record Company, Los Angeles, California, 1918, and of Butte County Historical Society Diggin's, Index to volumes 1 through 8, 1957-1964

== Personal life ==
She lived at Eureka, California.

She died on February 19, 1971, in Vallejo, California, and was buried with her family at Old Oroville Cemetery, Oroville.
