= Frances Burns Linn =

American librarian (1873–1962)

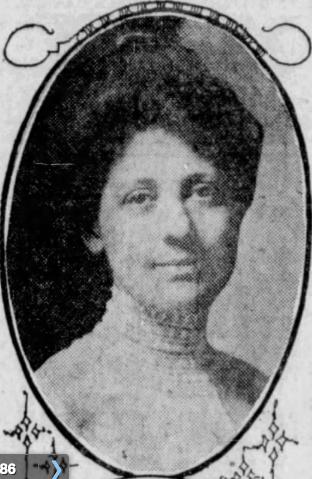
- Frances Burns Linn, from a 1911 newspaper.
- Born: September 17, 1873; Ohio, US
- Died: May 4, 1962 (aged 88)
- Occupation: librarian
- Honours: California Library Hall of Fame (2018)

Frances Burns Linn (September 17, 1873 – May 4, 1962) was an American librarian, the head librarian of the Santa Barbara Library from 1906 to 1943. She was inducted into the California Library Hall of Fame in 2018.

== Early life ==
Frances Burns was born in Ohio, the daughter of Helen Scott Burns and George W. Burns. Her father was a Methodist minister in Zanesville, Ohio. She attended the New York State Library School, and worked as a librarian in Norwalk, Ohio in 1902. She was a young widow when she moved to California in 1906.

== Career ==
Linn became head librarian of the Santa Barbara Public Library in 1906, during a state-wide expansion of free library services in California. In 1914, she toured eastern and midwestern cities to study public library facilities, and used a Carnegie Foundation grant to fund the city's new public library building, which opened in 1917. The King of Belgium visited the library in 1921. The Santa Barbara Library building was badly damaged in an earthquake in 1925, but reopened in 1926, and added the Faulkner Gallery in 1930.

Linn held various leadership positions with the California Library Association during her career, from district officer to president (in 1928). As county librarian, she was involved in the establishment of 59 public libraries in Santa Barbara County.

Linn explained her motivations and goals for librarianship when she said, "The library can be the means of building up the neighborhood life and community spirit. It can be the common interest in the small towns where differences of creed and politics and social position separate the people, dissipating the forces for good."

== Personal life and legacy ==
Linn traveled to Europe in 1922, and again in 1938, both times with her friend, educator Mary H. Tracy. Frances Burns Linn died in 1962, aged 88 years, in Santa Barbara. In 2018 Linn was inducted into the California Library Hall of Fame. In 2019, a presentation by librarian Jody Thomas about the history of local libraries was given at libraries in Santa Barbara County, under the title "History Alive: Jody Thomas IS Frances Linn!".
