= Dorothea Nelson =

American librarian (1903–1994)

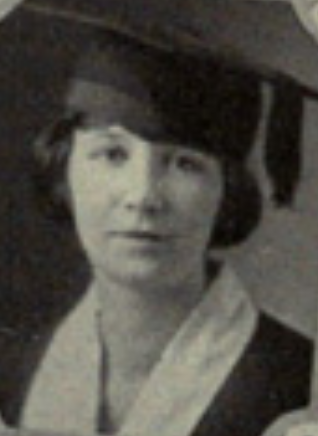
- Dorothea Dudley (later Nelson), from the 1925 yearbook of the University of California
- Born: Dorothea Dudley; August 23, 1903; Colorado Springs, Colorado
- Died: November 17, 1994 (aged 91); Fort Worth, Texas
- Occupation: Librarian

Dorothea Dudley Nelson (August 23, 1903 – November 17, 1994) was an American librarian. She was director of the Carnegie Library in Santa Maria, California for 34 years, and was inducted into the California Library Hall of Fame in 2019.

== Early life and education ==
Dorothea Dudley was born in Colorado Springs, Colorado, the daughter of Charles Henry Dudley and Fannie May Holroyd Dudley. Her father was a lawyer. She earned a degree in French and history, and trained as a librarian, at the University of California, Berkeley.

== Career ==
As a young woman, Dudley worked in her father's law office, and taught music at the Colorado State Institute for the Blind and Deaf. From 1934 to 1968, she was director of the Carnegie Library in Santa Maria, California. During her tenure the Santa Maria library built a new location in 1941, and expanded its buildings twice. "Every time we put on an addition, it seemed more crowded than before," she recalled. She was also active in improving library services in nearby communities, including Cuyama, Guadalupe, Orcutt, and Los Alamos. She was a member of the California Library Association and president of the association's Black Gold district.

Nelson was president of the Minerva Club of Santa Maria from 1944 to 1945, and president of the Soroptimist Club in 1956. She was chair of the board of directors for the local American Red Cross chapter from 1954 to 1956, and she was elected president of the Santa Maria Valley Historical Society in 1968. She also taught dance classes and supported the local Camp Fire Girls program. In 1970, she was named Citizen of the Year by the Santa Maria Chamber of Commerce.

== Personal life ==
Dorothea Dudley married Paul Lancourt Nelson, a city official and swim coach in Santa Maria. They had a daughter, Diana. Her husband died in 1952, and she died in 1994, at her daughter's home in Fort Worth, Texas. A library conference room was named in her honor. She was inducted into the California Library Hall of Fame in 2019.
