= All Saints Episcopal Church (San Diego, California) =

Coordinates: 32.74498°N 117.15934°W

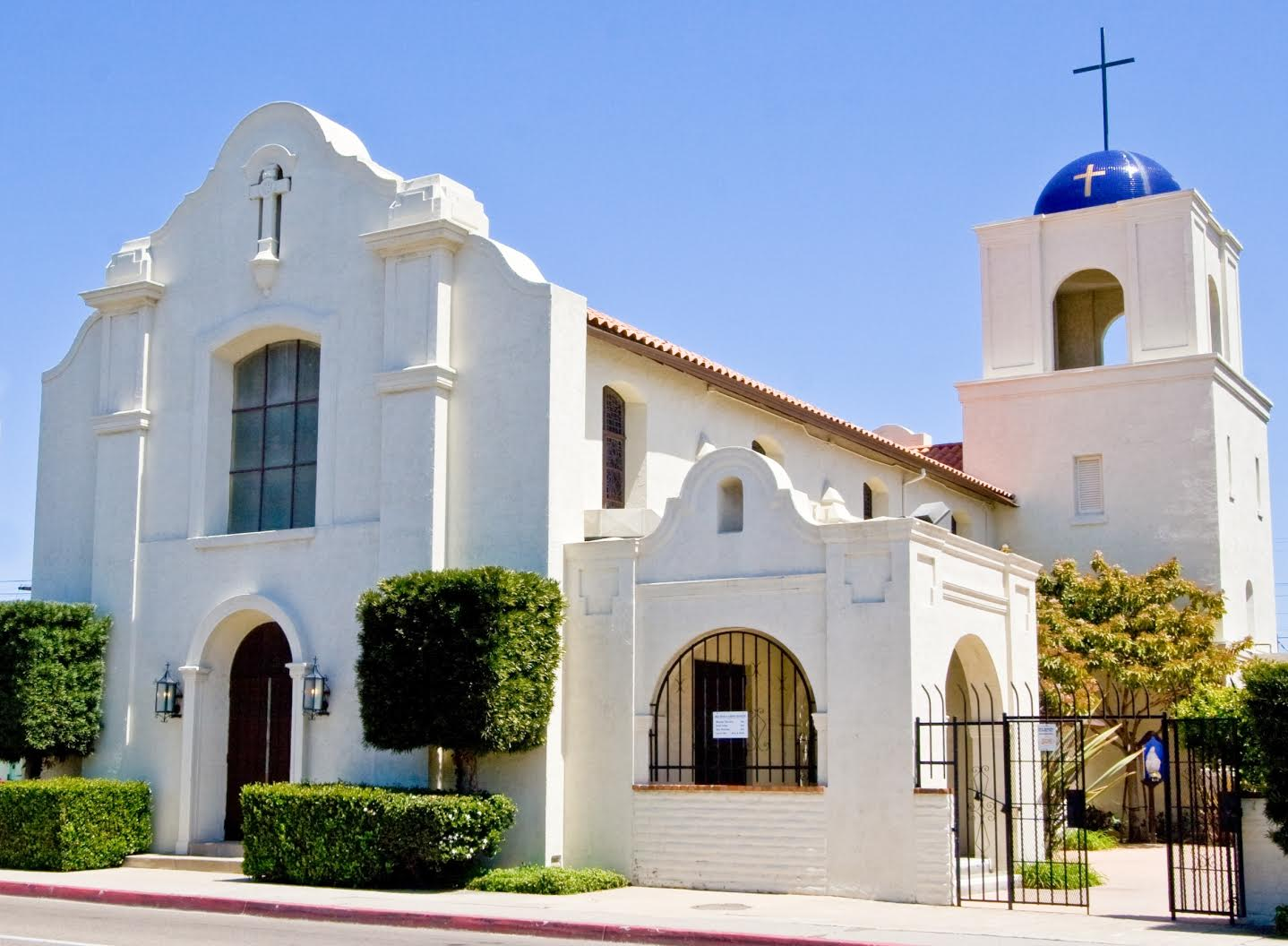
All Saints Episcopal Church (San Diego, California)

All Saints’ Episcopal Church is an historic house of worship in San Diego, California. It is noted for its traditional Anglican services, its music program, and its art and architecture.

All Saints’ has existed continuously and at the same location for a longer time than any other church in San Diego. Founded in 1896 as a mission of St. Paul’s Episcopal Church, it moved to its current position on the corner of Sixth and Pennsylvania Avenues in 1899 and became a parish in 1906. The new neighborhood of Hillcrest grew up around it.

The present church building was constructed in 1912. It was designed by two people of prominence in San Diego architectural history, William Sterling Hebbard (1863-1930) and Carleton Monroe Winslow, Sr. The church is a classic representative of the Mission style, on which Hebbard had done extensive research. The building’s structure has not been altered since 1912, and most of the original furnishings are still in place.

Harmonious additions were made in 1924 (a parish hall) and 1948-1950 (a chapel, meeting room, and offices). These expansions were also designed by important architects: William Henry Wheeler (1872-1956) for the parish hall and Louis Gill (1885-1969) for the additions of the late 1940s. Between 1957 and 1967 the church was beautified by 32 works of stained glass, produced by the renowned Judson Studios of Los Angeles. These windows follow a unified program that includes sequences illustrating the history of the Christian church, the life of the Virgin, and the host of angels. The great west window is a representation of Christ the King surrounded by emblems of the sacraments and the four Gospel writers.

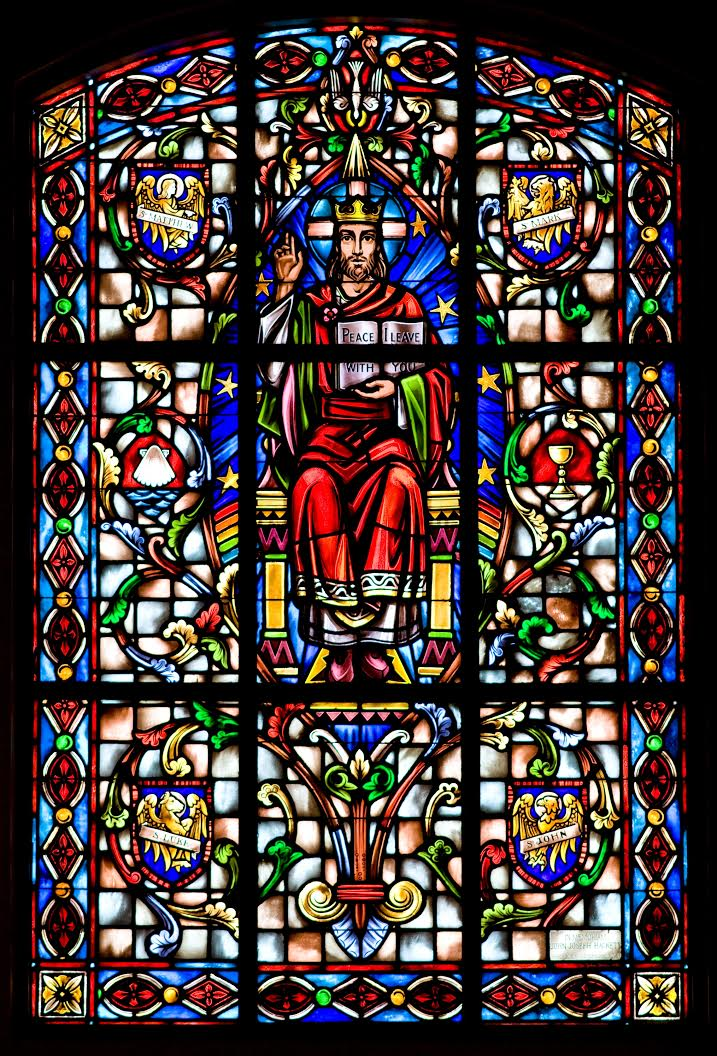
The West Window, All Saints Episcopal Church (San Diego, California)

The remarkable acoustics of the church have made it a preferred location for many musical events. Its choir and organ (M. P. Moller, 1973) provide classical and traditional Christian music for weekly services and special occasions.

Since its beginning, All Saints’ has been a metropolitan church, attracting members from throughout the San Diego area. Its congregation is diverse in age, sex, ethnicity, and occupation. The church sponsors a popular preschool and provides facilities for a variety of social service organizations. It continues the traditional Anglican worship service known to Episcopalians as Rite I.
