= National Foundation on the Arts and the Humanities =

United States federal agency

The National Foundation on the Arts and the Humanities is an agency of the United States federal government that was established in 1965. Its purpose is to "develop and promote a broadly conceived national policy of support for the humanities and the arts in the United States, and for institutions which preserve the cultural heritage of the United States."

It is composed of four sub-agencies:

- National Endowment for the Arts
- National Endowment for the Humanities
- Institute of Museum and Library Services
- Federal Council on the Arts and the Humanities

== Federal Council on the Arts and the Humanities ==
The Federal Council on the Arts and the Humanities has 19 members:

- Chairman of the National Endowment for the Arts
- Chairman of the National Endowment for the Humanities
- Secretary of Education
- Director of the National Science Foundation
- Librarian of Congress
- Chairman of the Commission of Fine Arts
- Archivist of the United States
- Commissioner of the Public Buildings Service of the General Services Administration
- Administrator of the General Services Administration
- Director of the United States Information Agency
- Secretary of the Interior
- Secretary of Commerce
- Secretary of Transportation
- Chairman of the National Museum Services Board
- Director of the Institute of Museum and Library Services
- Secretary of Housing and Urban Development
- Secretary of Labor
- Secretary of Veterans Affairs
- Commissioner of the Administration on Aging
