= Ella Morgan =

American librarian (1876–1958)

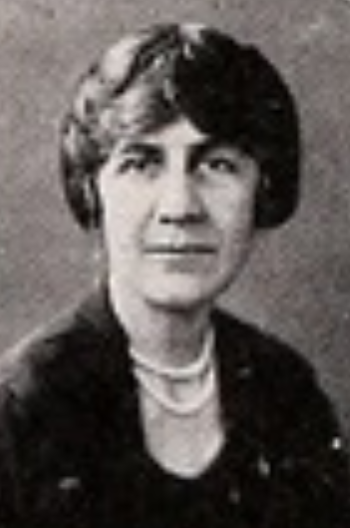
- Ella S. Morgan, from the 1926 yearbook of Abraham Lincoln High School
- Born: April 28, 1876; Los Angeles, California
- Died: February 26, 1958 (aged 81); Santa Barbara, California
- Occupation: Librarian

Ella Sarah Morgan (April 28, 1876 – February 26, 1958) was an American librarian, and the first professional school librarian in California. She was inducted into the California Library Hall of Fame in 2015.

== Early life and education ==
Morgan was born in Los Angeles, the daughter of George Washburn Morgan and Alice Sabrina Brown Morgan. Both parents were born in New York. Her father was a real estate developer, and mother was a schoolteacher in Santa Barbara as a young woman. Painter and educator Vesta Olmstead was Morgan's cousin.

== Career ==
Morgan was a librarian at the Los Angeles Public Library when she was appointed school librarian at Los Angeles High School in 1903, making her the first professional school librarian in California. From 1913 to 1940, she was librarian at Lincoln High School. She bought and planted a "small, though beautiful" deodar cedar tree on campus, to be decorated for Christmas each year. "If every family adhered to this new plan of outdoor Christmas trees which many may enjoy, foresters of today would not have such a problem to work out in view of preserving our forests," she explained to the local newspaper in 1928.

Morgan was a founder of the Los Angeles School Library Association (LASLA) in 1914, and the first president of the California School Library Association (CSLA) when it was founded in 1915. The organization worked for professional standards and status for school librarians in California. She was featured as a speaker at the 1914 meeting of the National Education Association, held in Oakland. Morgan was also involved with professionalization of the field on the national level, when she helped to draft Standard Library Organization and Equipment for Secondary Schools of Different Sizes (1920). She addressed the 1930 meeting of the American Library Association, when it was held in Los Angeles. She was honored with a "book breakfast" event in 1943, by the CSLA.

== Personal life ==
Morgan lived in Los Angeles and Pasadena with her sister Mabel V. Morgan, a retired school teacher. Mabel died in 1955, and Ella Morgan died in 1958, both in Santa Barbara, California. She was inducted into the California Library Hall of Fame in 2015.
