= Sacramento State University Library =

Library at California State University, Sacramento

Coordinates: 38°33′34″N 121°25′25″W

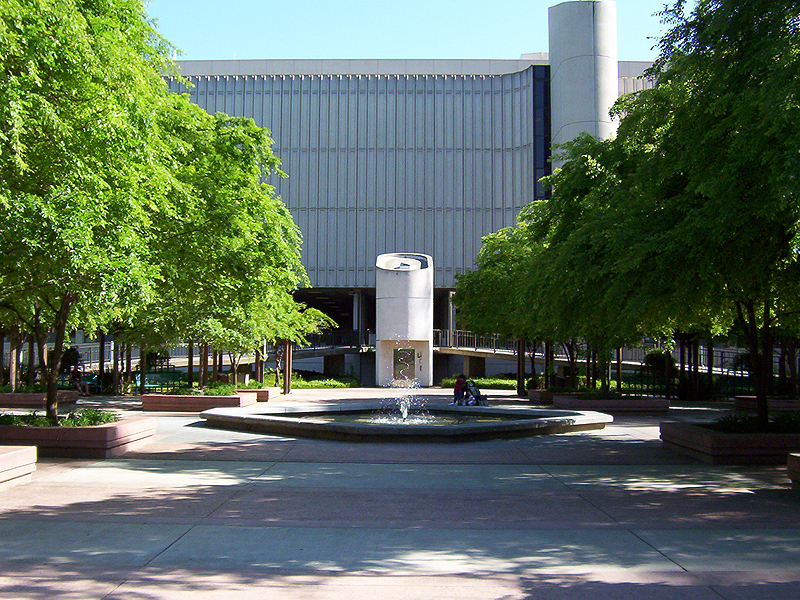
- Established: 1947

Collection
- Size: 1.4 million (books); 28,000 thesis projects; 6 floors; 275,000-square-feet

Access and use
- Circulation: 306,594
- Population served: 40,000 CSUS faculty, staff, students, and alumni in addition to the East Sacramento community

Other information
- Budget: $8 million annually
- Director: Amy Kautzman
- Employees: 171 (27 librarians; 34 library assistants; 12 academic related; 83 staff; 27 student employees)
- Website: http://library.csus.edu/

Sacramento State University Library is the central library for the campus of California State University, Sacramento. With over 1.4 million volumes, it is the third largest library in the California State University. It is part of the California State Depository Library Program. The library features 79 private study rooms, 4 meeting rooms, and 14 instructional classrooms. The library houses 200 public access research computer stations, 120 faculty/staff personal computers, and 5 computer classrooms ranging in capacities of 40 to 100. There are currently 27 full-time librarians and 34 library assistants. The library also features a number of group study rooms, individualized private rooms for graduate students, and individual study lounges.

== Historic timeline ==
=== 1947–1958 ===
In September 1947, the Library was established, sharing quarters with Sacramento City College. In 1953, a two-story Sacramento State Library was built near Sacramento Hall, featuring 30,000 volumes and a staff of 15, with its first Director Alan D. Covey.

=== 1959–1999 ===
In 1959 a third story increased the building's capacity by 125,000 volumes. Perry D. Morrison became the second Librarian in 1963. Gordon Martin overtook his role in 1966 and oversaw construction of a new library building. This six-story building, called Library I, opened in 1975. It provided 150,000 assignable square-feet of space and a capacity of 500,000 volumes. Joyce Ball assumed Library Director in 1980, followed by Charles Martell as Dean and University Librarian in 1987.

Library II, a four-story addition, opened in 1990, adding 88,000 assignable square-feet and included the installation of a large compact storage unit in the Library I lower level for enhanced collection space. In 1997, Patricia Larsen was appointed Dean and Director. During her tenure, three reference desks were consolidated into a single general area. Around this time a trend was for academic libraries to pursue increased access to remote collections in addition to continuing to build their locally held collections, leading to a dramatic increase in full-text journals and other collections via the acquisition of a variety of electronic resources. By the late 90s, the library soon subscribed to several hundred databases. In 1997, its first hands-on teaching lab with 15 computers was added.

Major acquisitions during this time include the John E. Moss Congressional Papers Collection, the Phil Isenberg Papers, the Japanese American Archival Collection and the Tsakopoulos Collection.

=== 2000s ===
Terry D. Webb became Dean and Director in 2002. At the beginning of the new millennium, the library officially had over 1.2 million volumes, non-print media, and millions of microforms. In 2002, another 30-computer lab teaching room was added. Today, the library has multiple teaching labs ranging from 30 to 100 computers in each. In 2008, Webb left his post, and Tabzeera Dosu (formerly at the University of Virginia library) became the new Dean and Director. Amy Kautzman was appointed Dean of the Library in December 2014.

=== Facts ===
The library is open an average of 97 hours per week with an annual circulation of over 306,594 items. Approximately 1,400 reference transactions occurred in a typical week. About 43,000 people entered the Library per week. Eighty-three FTE Library faculty, staff, and administrators served the academic community in addition to over forty FTE student assistants. The total budget is nearly $8 million, with more than 2 million for collections and database licenses. In 1947, the budget was $2,200. Over 14,000 students are reached in formal library instruction opportunities during the school year.

== Present day features ==
The library features a premier Greek research collection, the Tsakopoulos Hellenic Collection. With over 75,000 volumes, ephemera and artwork it is the largest of its kind in the Nation. The collection bears the name of developer and alumnus Angelo Tsakopoulos. In 1994, Mary Tsukamoto, a schoolteacher from Elk Grove, California donated her work pertaining to the World War II internment of Japanese-born individuals and Americans of Japanese descent, later donations came from the Florin Japanese American Citizens League and Sacramento VFW Nisei Post 8985, collectively forming what is today the Japanese American Archival Collection. The library is one of only three in the nation to have a copy of a rare multi-lingual encyclopedia of botanical and natural specimens (published in 1852). The library also houses the Magnus Hirschfeld Collection of Gay, Lesbian, Bisexual and Transsexual History.

== Serna Center ==
The Center opened in 2003 and was named after the late Sacramento Mayor and Sac State professor Joe Serna, Jr. and the late university administrator and Ethnic Studies professor Isabella Hernandez Serna. The Center's mission is to encourage policy and political knowledge, activism and engagement, student access and excellence, and community service. Its primary focus, but not solely, is the Chicano/a and Latino/a community in the Sacramento Region.

== Sōkiku Nakatani tea room and garden ==
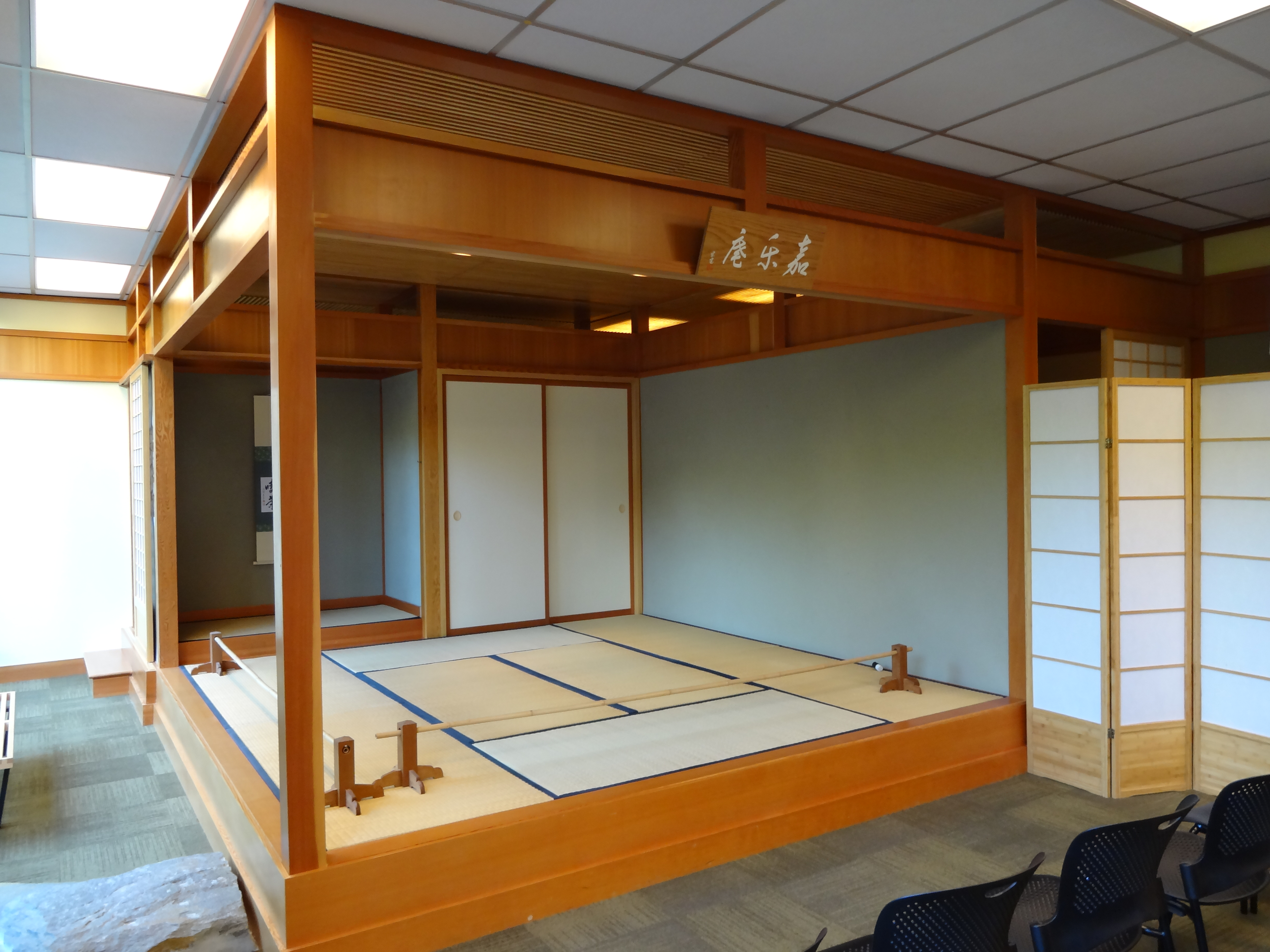
Interior of Sōkiku Nakatani Tea Room and Garden

The Tea Room on the ground floor of the library was an anonymous donor gift to the university, by someone wishing to honor their late mother who practiced and taught the art of chadō. Included in the donation was the mother's collection of teaware utensils and ceramics. Members of San Francisco's Uransenke Foundation perform the traditional tea ceremony on campus several times a year.

== University Library gallery ==
Founded in 2002, the gallery displays work by nationally and internationally acclaimed artists, including alumni and faculty. It also serves as a venue for recitals, readings, and other academic activities for the School of the Arts. The 2,000-square-foot art gallery features two major exhibits each year.

== Deans and directors ==
- Alan D. Covey (1953-1963)
- Perry D. Morrison (1963-1966)
- Gordon Martin (1966-1980)
- Joyce Ball (1980-1987)
- Charles Martell (1987-1997)
- Patricia Larsen (1997-2002)
- Terry D. Webb (2002-2008)
- Tabzeera Dosu (2008–2014)
- Amy Kautzman (2015–Present)
