= Mabel R. Gillis =

American librarian (1882–1961)

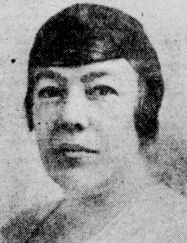
- Mabel R. Gillis, from a 1919 newspaper.
- Born: September 24, 1882; Sacramento, California, US
- Died: September 6, 1961 (aged 78); Sacramento, California, US
- Occupation: Librarian
- Known for: State Librarian of California (1930–1952)
- Parent: James Louis Gillis

Mabel Ray Gillis (September 24, 1882 – September 6, 1961) was an American librarian. From 1930 to 1952, she served as the seventeenth State Librarian of California, the first woman to hold that office.

== Early life ==
Mabel Ray Gillis was born in Sacramento, California, the daughter of James Louis Gillis and Kate Petree Gillis. She attended Mrs. Spillman's school in Sacramento, and earned a teaching certificate from the University of California, Berkeley in 1902.

== Career ==
Gillis began working at the California State Library in 1904, while her father was the State Librarian. In 1917, she was appointed assistant to his successor, Milton J. Ferguson. She became State Librarian when Ferguson resigned in 1930; she was the first woman to be State Librarian of California. She served under five governors, presided over the library's centennial celebration in 1950, and retired from the office in 1952. "Under her leadership, the state library has grown from a humble beginning to one of the great libraries of the West," commented governor Earl Warren. "I regret to see Miss Gillis retire, but she has earned it."

Gillis's professional interests included library services for blind readers. She was head of the state library's Books for the Blind section from its beginning in 1904, and began statewide programs for teaching reading skills to blind readers. As State Librarian, she worked on improving the status and skills of county librarians, with an annual conference and a certification program. She also expanded California's union catalog, allowing local libraries to offer patrons a wider range of titles through interlibrary loans. During World War II, she headed the library's drive to collect books for American servicemen.

Gillis was president of the Sacramento Business and Professional Women's Club (1920–1922), and of the California Library Association (1929–1930), and of the National Association of State Libraries (1935). She served on the executive board of the American Library Association.

== Personal life ==
Gillis died in 1961, aged 78 years, in Sacramento. In 2018, she was inducted into the California Library Hall of Fame. A branch of the Sacramento City Library system was named for Gillis. Her papers are archived in the California State Library.
