= Fresno State Library =

Academic library

Coordinates: 36°48′43″N 119°44′58″W

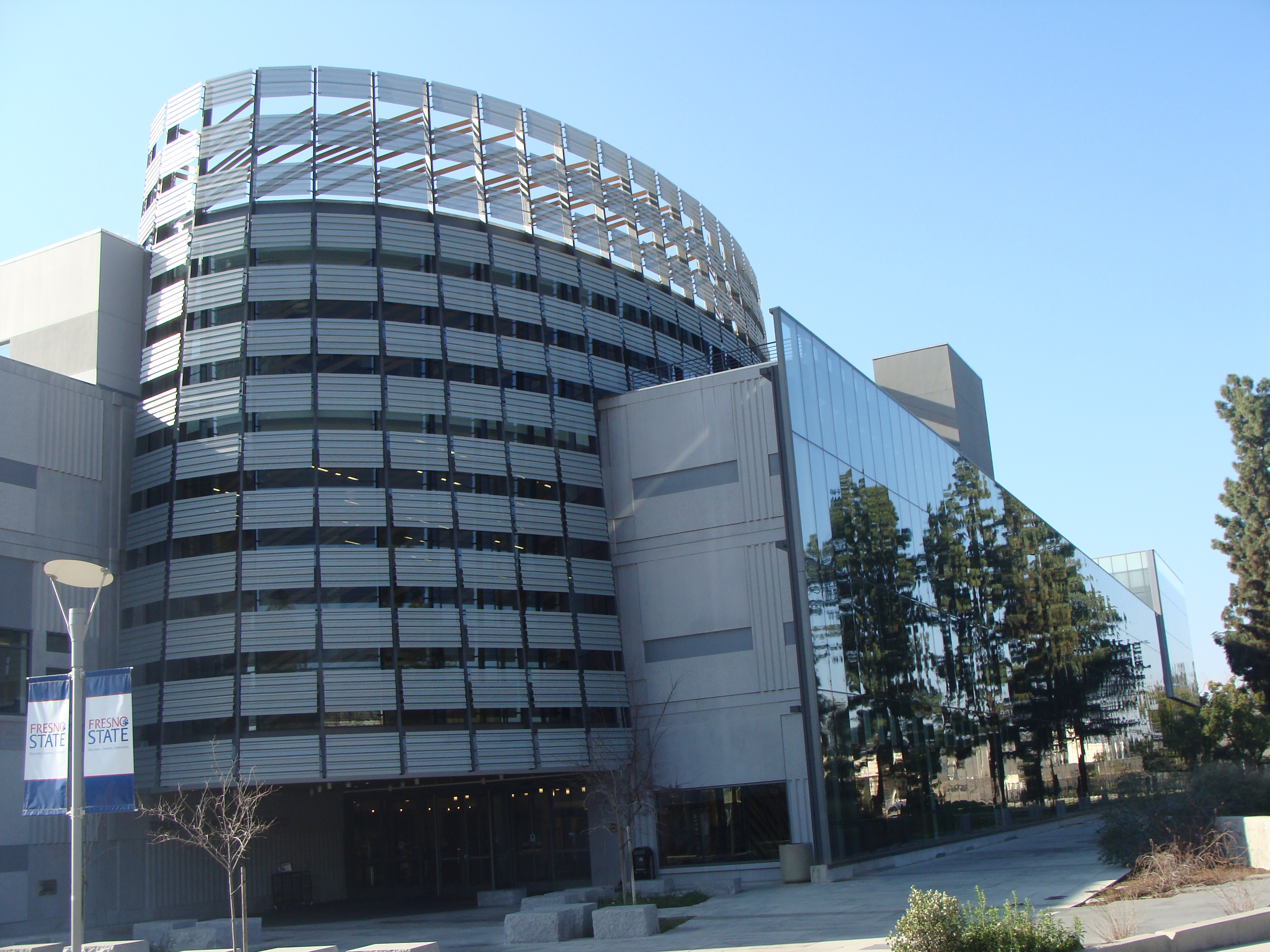
- Main entrance to the Fresno State Library
- Established: 1911
- Branches: 1 library; 2 buildings

Collection
- Size: 1.1 million (books); 5 floors; 365,000-square-feet

Access and use
- Circulation: 382,148

Other information
- Budget: $7.5 million annually
- Employees: 84.5 FTE (19 librarians; 31 library staff; 26.5 student assistants; 8 other professional)
- Website: https://library.fresnostate.edu/

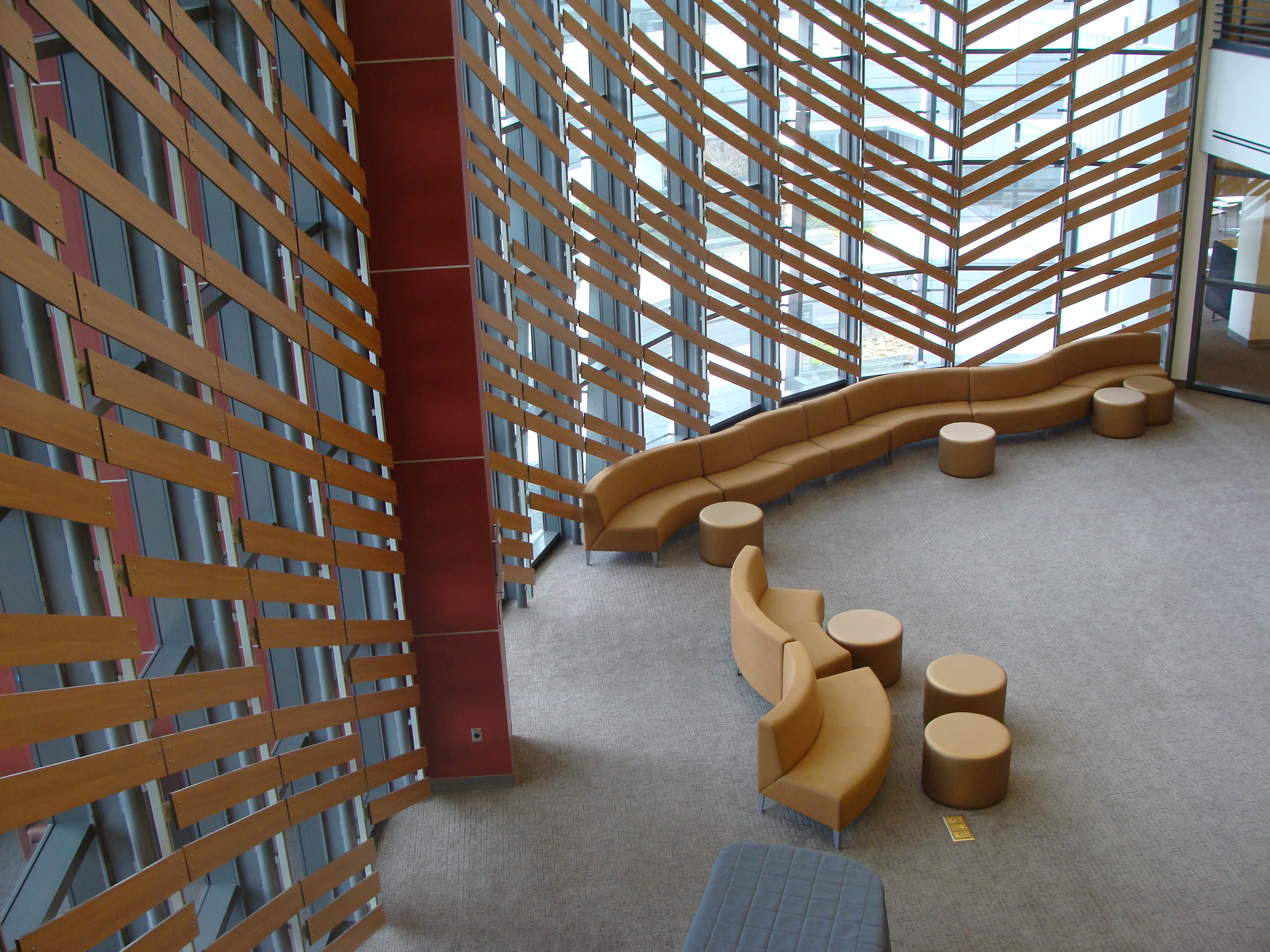
Leon S. Peters Ellipse Gallery

The Fresno State Library is the name of an academic library in Fresno, California. It serves as the main resource for recorded knowledge and information supporting the teaching, research, and service functions of the California State University, Fresno.

== History ==
The library was established in 1911 and it was named after former library dean Henry Madden in 1981. The university's Board of Trustees voted to rename the library in 2022 due to controversy regarding Madden's political views (see below).

In 2009, the library underwent a major $105 million renovation that was largely financed by a multi-million-dollar endowment from the Table Mountain casino, operated by the Chukchansi tribes of California.

Michael Gorman, another former dean of the library, was the president of the American Library Association in 2005–2006.

== Controversy ==
In November 2021, Fresno State's president, Saúl Jiménez-Sandoval, announced that a task force had been created to investigate renaming the library due to information that had come to light recently concerning Henry Madden's "deeply held anti-Semitic views and Nazi sympathies." The task force reviewed over 100,000 letters and documents donated to the library after Madden's death which had been curated by the former librarian and contained antisemitic and pro-Nazi views. "While Dr. Madden had the opportunity later in life to reflect on those views, there is no evidence that he renounced those views."

On July 14, 2022, the Fresno State Board of Trustees voted to rename the Henry Madden Library.

== Design ==
The newest, main building was designed by AC Martin and Partners and is based on elements derived from Native American basket weaving, as is evidenced in the façade and interior of the building.

== Collections ==
The library contains 1.13 million volumes in 370,000 sq feet, placing it among the largest libraries in the California State University system. The library is home to the largest installation of compact shelving on any single floor in the United States. The shelves amount to over 20 miles in length. It is currently the third largest library in the CSU system (in terms of square footage), and among the top ten largest in the CSU system based on the number of volumes. It also is the largest academic building on the Fresno State campus.

The library features a number of special collections such as:

- The Arne Nixon Center for the Study of Children's Literature, a research center with over 55,000 books and manuscripts, the oldest dating back to 1865, one of the largest collections west of the Mississippi.
- Woodward Special Collections Research Center, containing the Central Valley Political Archive.
- 15 photographs by Ansel Adams
- Federal and California Government depository collection

The oldest book in the collection is a 1474 copy of Vita Christi (The life of Christ) by Ludolph of Saxony in two volumes, acquired in 1963.
