= Santa Barbara Library =

Coordinates: 34.4240°N 119.7034°W

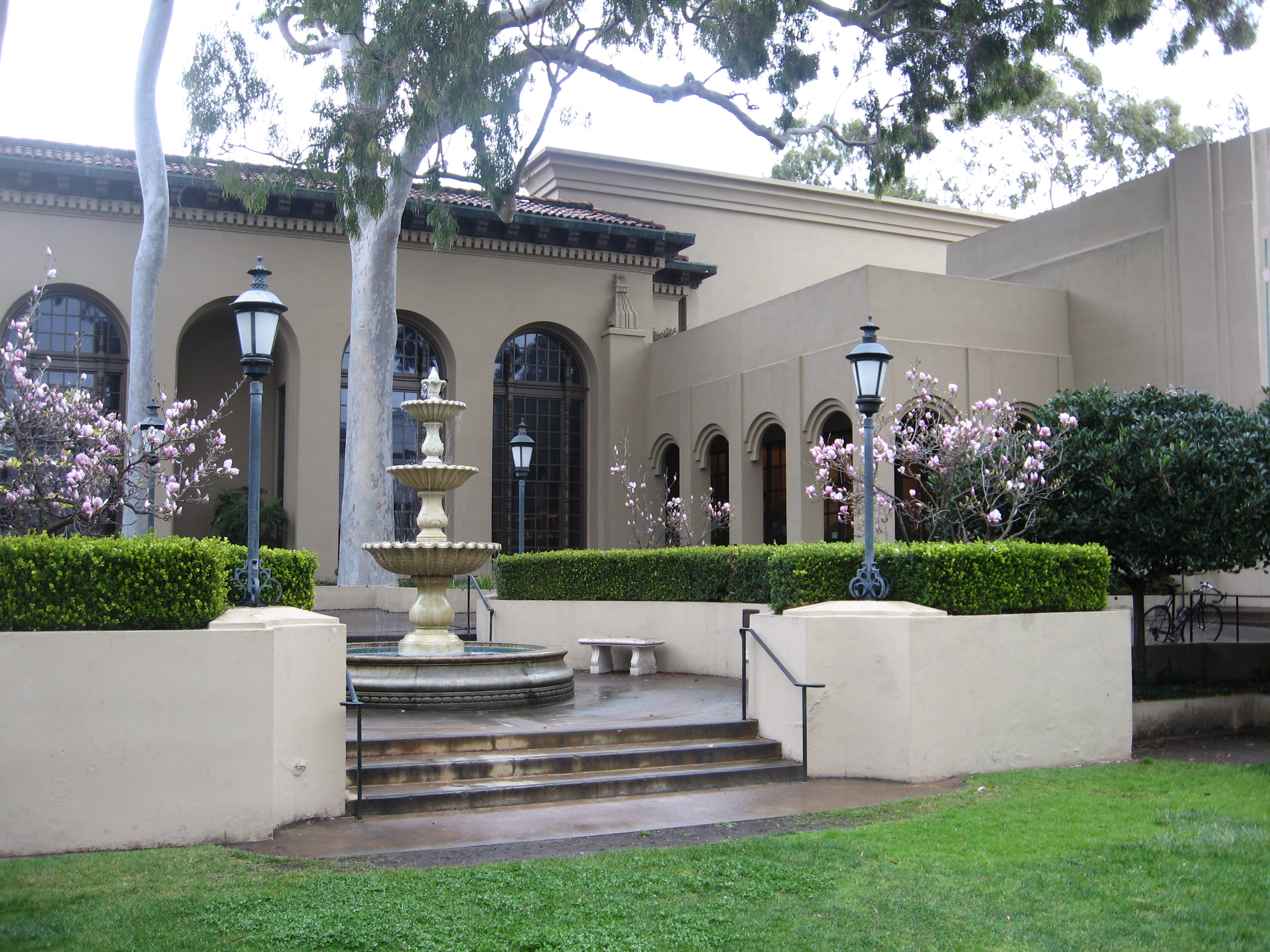
The Library.

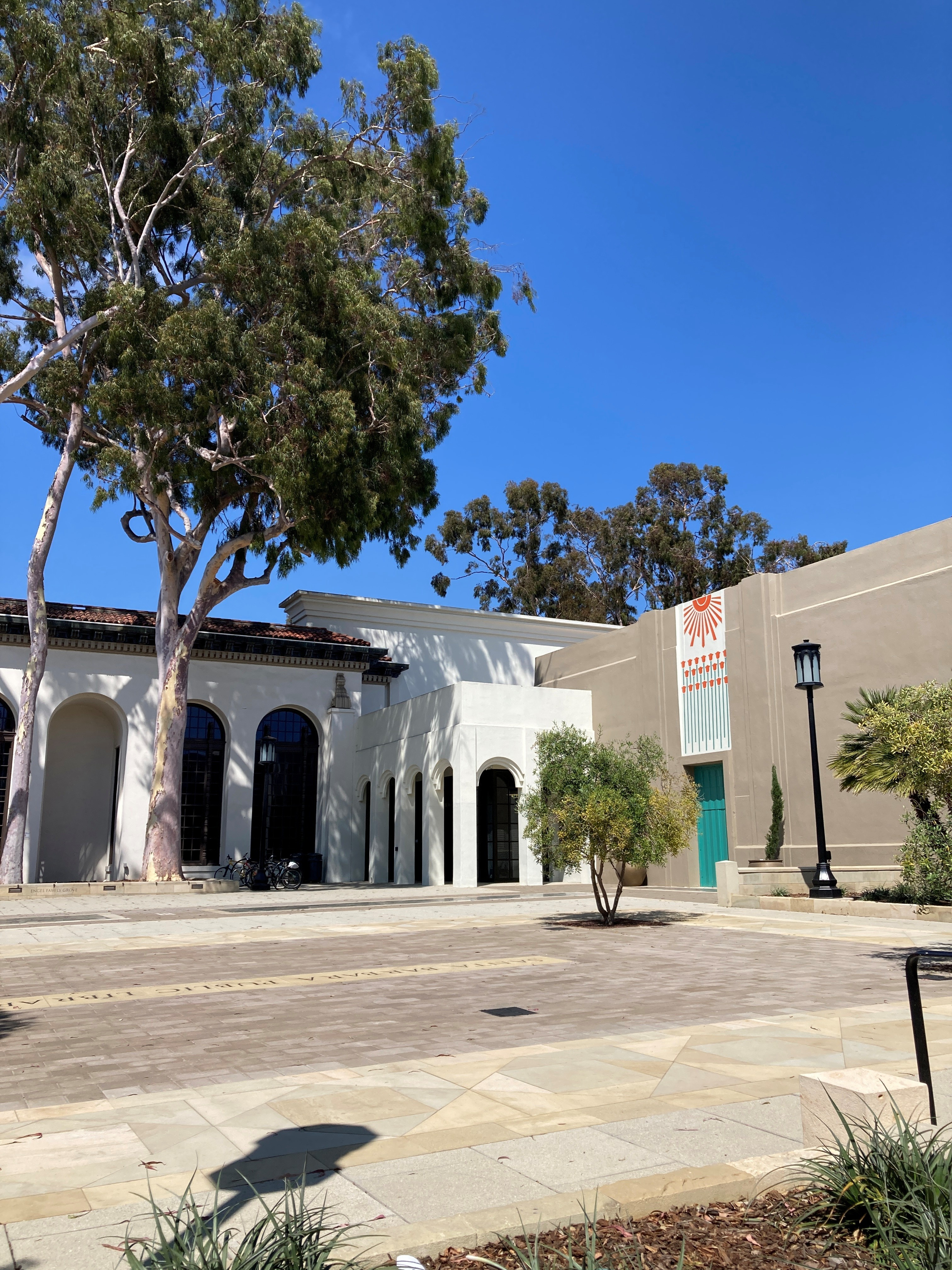
Michael Towbes Library Plaza at Santa Barbara Public Library, 2025.

The Santa Barbara Public Library is the public library system of Santa Barbara, California.

The Santa Barbara Public Library is the main library in Santa Barbara. It contains 290,086 volumes. In fiscal year 2017 the library system circulated 1,888,710 items to approximately 235,577 residents. The library's current interim director is Brandon Beaudette, who has held his position since 2025. There are branch libraries in Montecito and on the Eastside of Santa Barbara.

The Faulkner Memorial Art Gallery, and Faulkner East and West Galleries, are also located within the library building.

The original building was designed by local architect Francis W. Wilson, based on sketches by Henry Hornbostel of Pittsburgh, and opened on August 27, 1917, with Frances Burns Linn as head librarian. Carleton Winslow directed the 1925 reconstruction (following the 1925 Santa Barbara earthquake) and designed the tympanum over the main entry. The Faulkner Memorial Art Gallery was designed by Myron Hunt and opened on October 15, 1930. In 1979-1980 the library was remodeled and expanded under the direction of Jerry Zimmer.

The Santa Barbara Public Library is located in the center of the city of Santa Barbara, between Anacapa and State Streets, opposite to the Santa Barbara County Courthouse building and adjacent to the Santa Barbara Museum of Art.
