= Leon S. Peters =

Businessman from Fresno, California

Leon Peters
- Born: October 28, 1905; Fowler, California
- Died: 26 November 1983 (aged 78); Fresno, California
- Occupations: Businessman and philanthropist
- Employer(s): Valley Foundry; Central California War Industries
- Spouse: Alice Peters

Leon S. Peters was a businessman, licensed engineer, and philanthropist in California's San Joaquin Valley.

Peters was born in 1905 in the city of Fowler, California, to Samuel and Lily Peters, who were Armenian immigrants from Bitlis.

Between 1926 and 1929, Peters worked for his uncle's grape-packing business, where he was recruited as a salesman for Valley Foundry and Machine Works. In 1940, he purchased the company from its owners.

During World War II, Peters became the president of the Central California War Industries company which was later awarded the Army-Navy E award. After the war, he continued his role in manufacturing as president of Valley Foundry and Machine Works. He became known for helping raise money for the expansion of California State University, Fresno and the Community Medical Center.

Known for being active in the local community, Peters was a member of the Fresno Chamber of Commerce, Masons, and Rotary. In 1955, he founded the Leon S Peters Foundation.

== Honorary degrees ==
In 1996, Peters was posthumously awarded an honorary doctorate from California State University, Fresno.

San Joaquin College of Law awarded him an honorary Juris Doctor.
