= Carleton Winslow =

American architect (1876–1946)

Carleton Monroe Winslow
- Born: December 27, 1876; Damariscotta, Maine, U.S.
- Died: December 27, 1946 (aged 70)
- Education: Art Institute of Chicago; École des Beaux-Arts
- Occupation: Architect
- Years active: Early 20th century
- Children: Carleton Winslow, Jr. (1919–1983)
- Practice: Office of Bertram Goodhue
- Buildings: Los Angeles Public Library; Carthay Circle Theatre; Santa Barbara Public Library; multiple buildings at Panama–California Exposition
- Projects: Spanish Colonial Revival architecture in Southern California

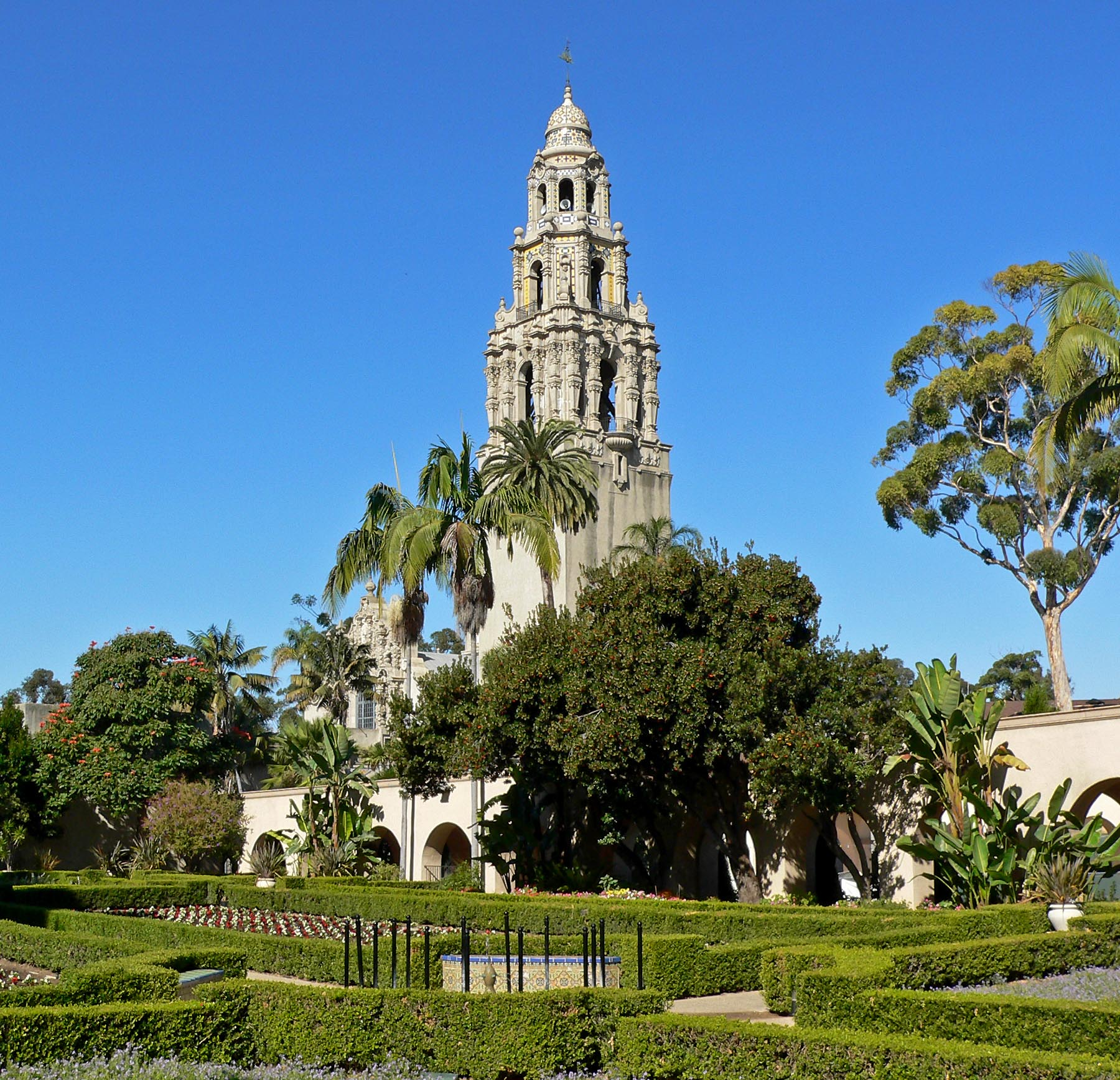
California Building, now the Museum of Us, Panama–California Exposition, 1915

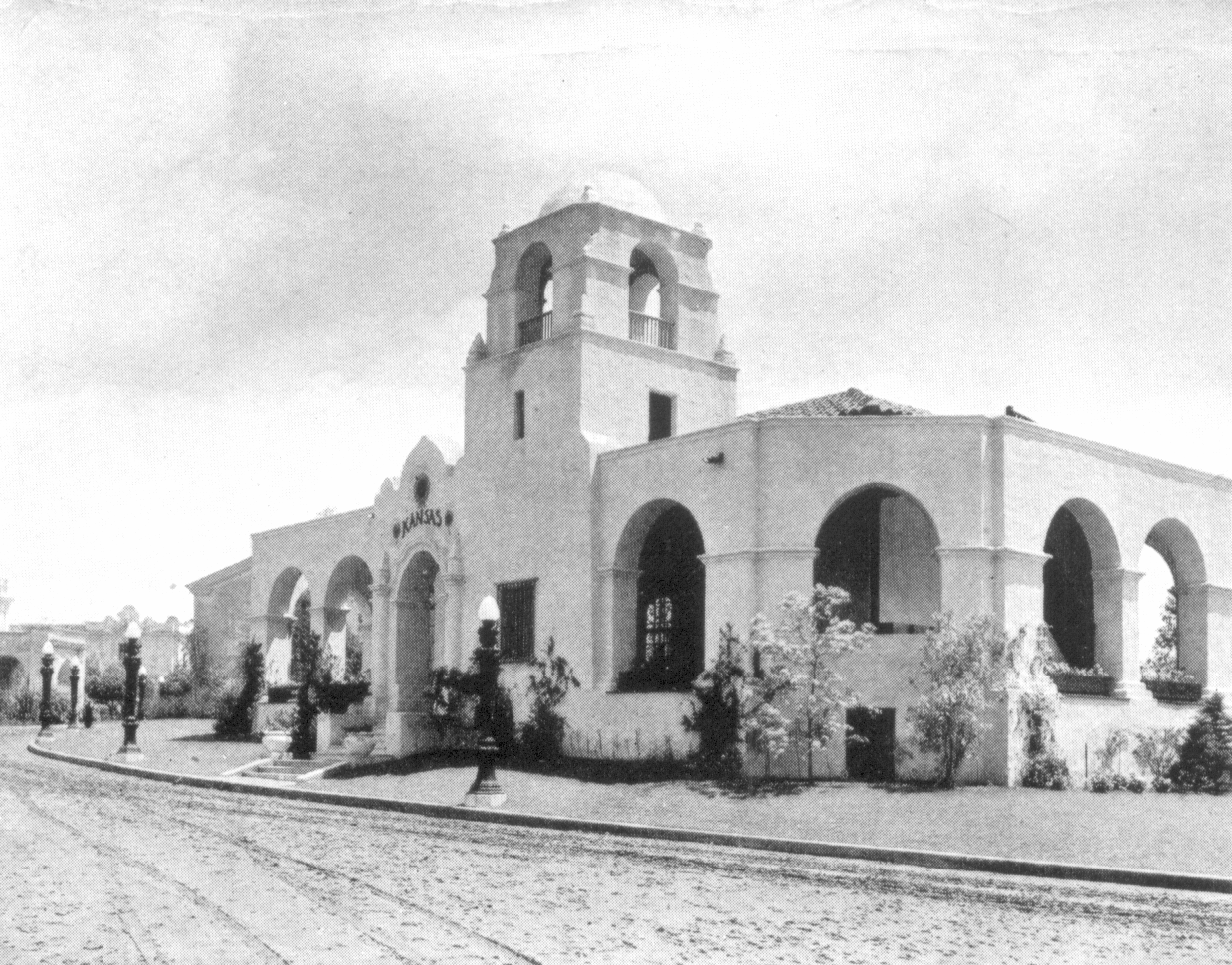
Kansas Building, Panama–California Exposition, 1915

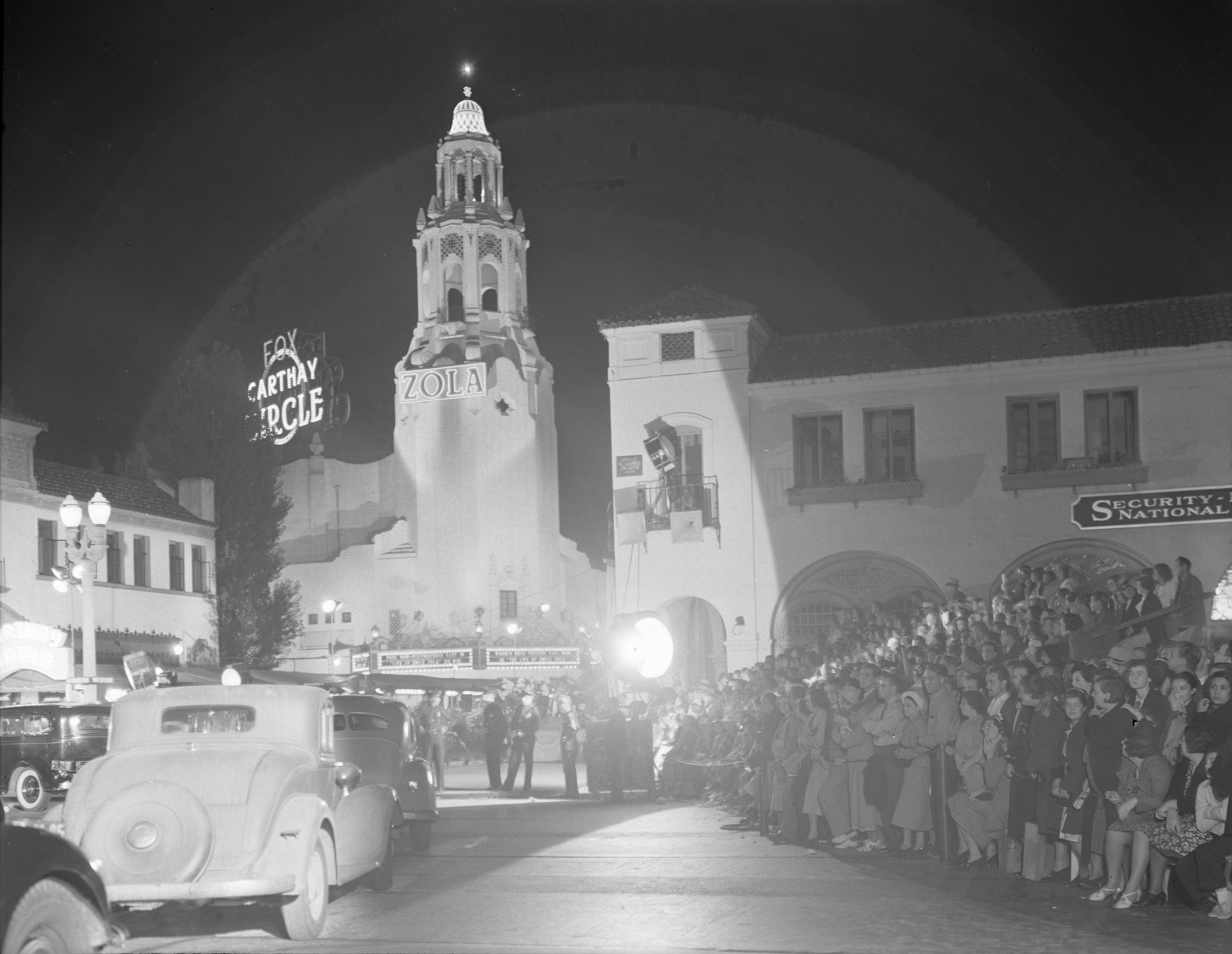
Carthay Circle Theater, Los Angeles, 1926

Carleton Monroe Winslow (December 27, 1876 – 1946), also known as Carleton Winslow Sr., was an American architect, and key proponent of Spanish Colonial Revival architecture in Southern California in the early 20th century.

== Biography ==
Winslow was born December 27, 1876, in Damariscotta, Maine, studied at the Art Institute of Chicago and at the École des Beaux-Arts, and joined the office of Bertram Goodhue in time for the planning of the 1915 San Diego Panama–California Exposition. Winslow is the one credited for choosing the Spanish Colonial style for that project, a choice with a vernacular regional precedent.

He moved to Southern California in 1917, where he completed the Los Angeles Public Library after Goodhue's death in 1924 and also pursued his own commissions, including a number of Episcopal churches. With Clarence Stein, he wrote The architecture and the gardens of the San Diego Exposition.

His son, Carleton Winslow, Jr. (1919–1983), was also an architect, specializing in churches in Southern California, as well as an architectural history professor and author.

== Work ==
The city seal of San Diego, designed by Winslow in 1914

- St. James Episcopal Church, South Pasadena, as associate of Cram, Goodhue & Ferguson, 1907
- All Saints' Episcopal Church, San Diego, 1913, with William S. Hebbard
- Official seal of the city of San Diego, 1914
- multiple buildings at the Panama–California Exposition, 1915, in collaboration with Bertram Goodhue; solely credited for certain structures including the Botanical Building
- multiple buildings at the Bishop's School (1916 Bishops Chapel, 1930 Bishops Chapel Tower, 1930 second story and dome of Bentham Hall, 1934 Wheeler Bailey Library), some with architectural sculpture, La Jolla, California
- Casa Dorinda, private mansion for Henry W.H. Bliss and wife Anna Dorinda Blaksley, Montecito, California, 1916
- Santa Barbara Museum of Natural History, Santa Barbara, California, 1916, with Floyd E. Brewster
- studio for painter Adolfo Müller-Ury, 3400 Monterey Road, San Marino, California, 1923 (finished late 1924)
- Los Angeles Public Library, completing the project after Bertram Goodhue's death in 1924
- Santa Barbara Public Library, 1924
- Carthay Circle Theatre, with Dwight Gibbs, Mid-Wilshire district of Los Angeles, 1926 (razed)
- First Baptist Church, Pasadena, with Frederick Kennedy, 1926
- Bel-Air Country Club, Bel Air, Los Angeles, California, 1926
- design of 18 stained glass windows for the passenger liner City of Honolulu, 1927
- Ojai Library, part of the Ventura County Library System, Ojai, California, 1928
- St. Mary of the Angels Church, Hollywood, 1930
- St. Paul's Episcopal Church, 260 East Alvarado, Pomona, California, 1931
- St. Mark's Episcopal Church, Glendale, California, Winslow's last design and completed by Louis A. Thomas, 1948
