= Institute of Museum and Library Services =

US federal government agency

Agency overview
- Formed: 1996; 30 years ago
- Headquarters: 955 L'Enfant Plaza; Washington, D.C.
- Employees: 70
- Annual budget: $313.58 million for 2023
- Agency executive: Keith Sonderling, Acting Director
- Website: www.imls.gov

The Institute of Museum and Library Services (IMLS) is an independent agency of the United States federal government established in 1996. It is the main source of federal support for libraries and museums within the United States, having the mission to "advance, support, and empower America's museums, libraries, and related organizations through grantmaking, research, and policy development". It has provided much of the funding for interlibrary loan programs in the United States.

In 2025 President Donald Trump issued an executive order that directed that the IMLS be eliminated "to the maximum extent consistent with applicable law", along with several other agencies. An ongoing lawsuit determined that the order was probably unconstitutional and the dismantling was temporarily blocked while the case continued through the courts.

== History and purpose ==
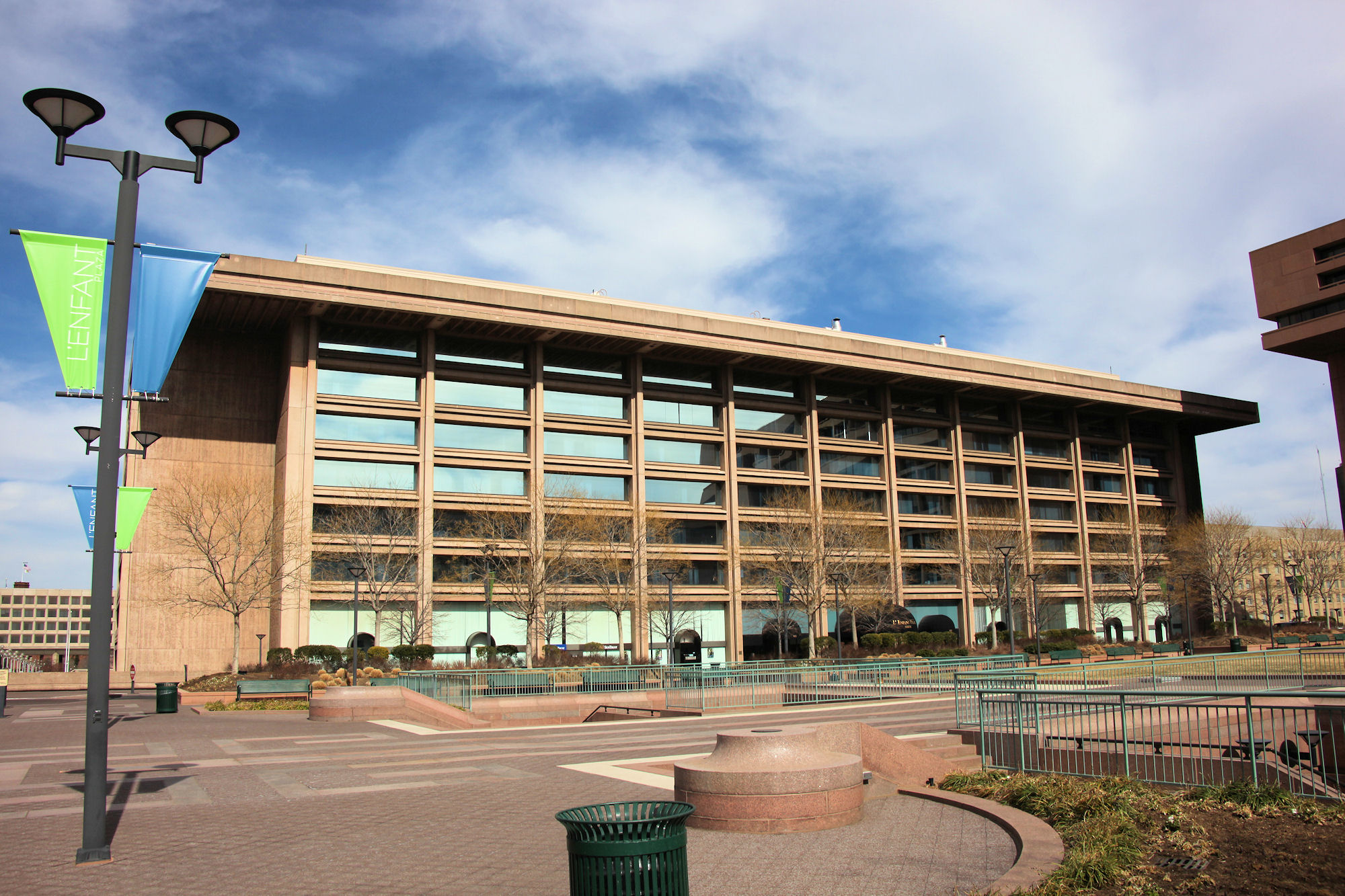
IMLS is headquartered in the North Building of the L'Enfant Plaza complex.

IMLS was established by the Museum and Library Services Act (MLSA) on September 30, 1996, which includes the Library Services and Technology Act and the Museum Services Act. It consolidated the activities of the National Commission on Libraries and Information Science. The MLSA was reauthorized in 2003 and again in 2010. The law combined the Institute of Museum Services, which had been in existence since 1976 as part of the National Foundation on the Arts and the Humanities, and the Library Programs Office of the Office of Educational Research and Improvement which had been part of the Office of Education under various names since 1937.

Lawmakers saw "great potential in an Institute that is focused on the combined roles that libraries and museums play in our community life." As amended, MLSA authorizes IMLS to promote improvements in library services; to facilitate access to resources in libraries; to encourage resource sharing among libraries; to support museums in fulfilling their public service and educational roles; to encourage leadership and innovation to enhance museum services; to assist museums in the conservation of America's heritage; to support museums in achieving the highest standards of management and service to the public; and to support resource sharing among museums, libraries and other organizations. MLSA also authorizes IMLS to carry out and publish analyses of the impact of museum and library services.

Following a proposal by President George W. Bush, the activities of the National Commission on Libraries and Information Science was consolidated under IMLS, along with some of the activities of the National Center for Education Statistics, in order to create a unified body for federal support of library and information policy. The consolidation took effect in early 2008.

The agency is a member of the National Foundation on the Arts and the Humanities, along with the National Endowment for the Arts, the National Endowment for the Humanities, and the Federal Council on the Arts and the Humanities.

In creating IMLS, Congress observed that the federal library and museum programs are far reaching, spanning cultural, educational, scientific, and information policy matters. Congress declared in the institute’s authorizing legislation, “Democracy demands wisdom and vision in its citizens,” and an important role of the federal government is to promote education and access to information for people of all backgrounds, wherever located. By supporting museums and libraries throughout the nation, IMLS enables these organizations to carry out their public service role of connecting the whole of society with the cultural, artistic, historical, natural, and scientific understandings that constitute our heritage.

The Agency helps to ensure that all Americans have access to museum, library, and information services, and invests in new and exploratory approaches, as well as proven and tested methods. IMLS reports that it funds work that advances collective knowledge, lifelong learning, and cultural and civic engagement, as well as projects that support broadband access and advancing digital literacy, learning and education, civic engagement, climate change, and services that address historic and growing inequities. The Agency also builds capacity within the museum and library fields to enable better service to communities through workforce development grants and to enhance community decision making by sharing trends and data.

IMLS supports a vast range of museums, including art, history, natural history, and children’s museums, zoos, science and technology centers, historic houses, nature centers, and botanical gardens. Similarly, IMLS invests in libraries across America, including public, academic, tribal, research, and special libraries, as well as other eligible institutions like archives, nonprofit cultural organizations, and universities.

IMLS is the largest source of federal funding for libraries in the nation, directing population-based funding to all 50 states, the District of Columbia, the US territories, and Freely Associated States through its Grants to States program. In FY2022, IMLS awarded $257.2M to institutions across the country, of which $168.8M was through its Grants to States program.

In addition to its other responsibilities, IMLS annually awards the National Medal for Museum and Library Service, which is the nation’s highest honor for institutions that make significant and exceptional contributions to their communities. Since 1994, IMLS has presented the award to outstanding libraries and museums of all types and sizes that deeply impact their communities.

In fiscal year 2023, IMLS had a budget of $313.58 million. As of 2023, IMLS currently has 70 full-time employees, many of whom still work remotely. In 2022, the employees voted to unionize, joining hundreds of thousands of federal workers who have joined the American Federation of Government Employees (AFGE) to “build power and have a voice at work.”

The act comes up for reauthorization about every seven years. It was most recently reauthorized on December 31, 2018 by President Donald J. Trump (PL 115-410).

=== Executive order issued by President Trump in 2025 ===
On March 14, 2025, President Trump issued an executive order virtually eliminating IMLS that directed that "the non-statutory components and functions ... shall be eliminated to the maximum extent consistent with applicable law, and such entities shall reduce the performance of their statutory functions and associated personnel to the minimum presence and function required by law", along with minimizing several other agencies. The entire 70 person staff was put on leave on March 31, 2025.

The American Library Association (ALA) released the statement that the elimination of the IMLS would harm American libraries and museums, especially impacting rural communities. It urged to continue the support for libraries and called people to join the "Show Up for Our Libraries" campaign. The American Alliance of Museums also released the statement that the Trump action "threatens the critical roles museums and museum workers play in American society, and puts jobs, education, conservation, and vital community programs at risk", and called for action. The ALA also has stated that through this executive order that the administration is effectively "cutting off at the knees the most beloved and trusted of American institutions and the staff and services they offer.”

On May 1, 2025, a lawsuit brought by the American Library Association and the American Federation of State, County and Municipal Employees resulted in the U.S. District Court for the District of Columbia granting a limited temporary restraining order to block any further actions to dissolve IMLS. On September 11, 2025, the U.S. Court of Appeals for the First Circuit upheld the District Court decision, denying the Administration's request for a stay of that order. On November 21, 2025, the U.S. District Court for the District of Rhode Island was receptive to arguments that the Trump administrations's attempt to shutter IMLS was illegal and unconstitutional and temporarily blocked Trump's executive order to dismantle the agency while the case continued to work through the courts. IMLS announced Dec. 3, 2025, that it had reinstated all federal grants cut by Trump earlier in the year. Congress will next decide whether to fund IMLS in FY26.

== Leadership ==
When Congress passed the Library Services and Technology Act in 1996, it moved library responsibilities out of the Department of Education and created the IMLS as a new agency. The act stipulated that the agency maintain a rotating directorship starting with the former director of the Institute of Museum Services for a four-year term. In the fifth year, the directorship would pass to a representative from the field of library and information science. Each new director is appointed by the current president and confirmed by the Senate for a four-year term.

=== Directors ===
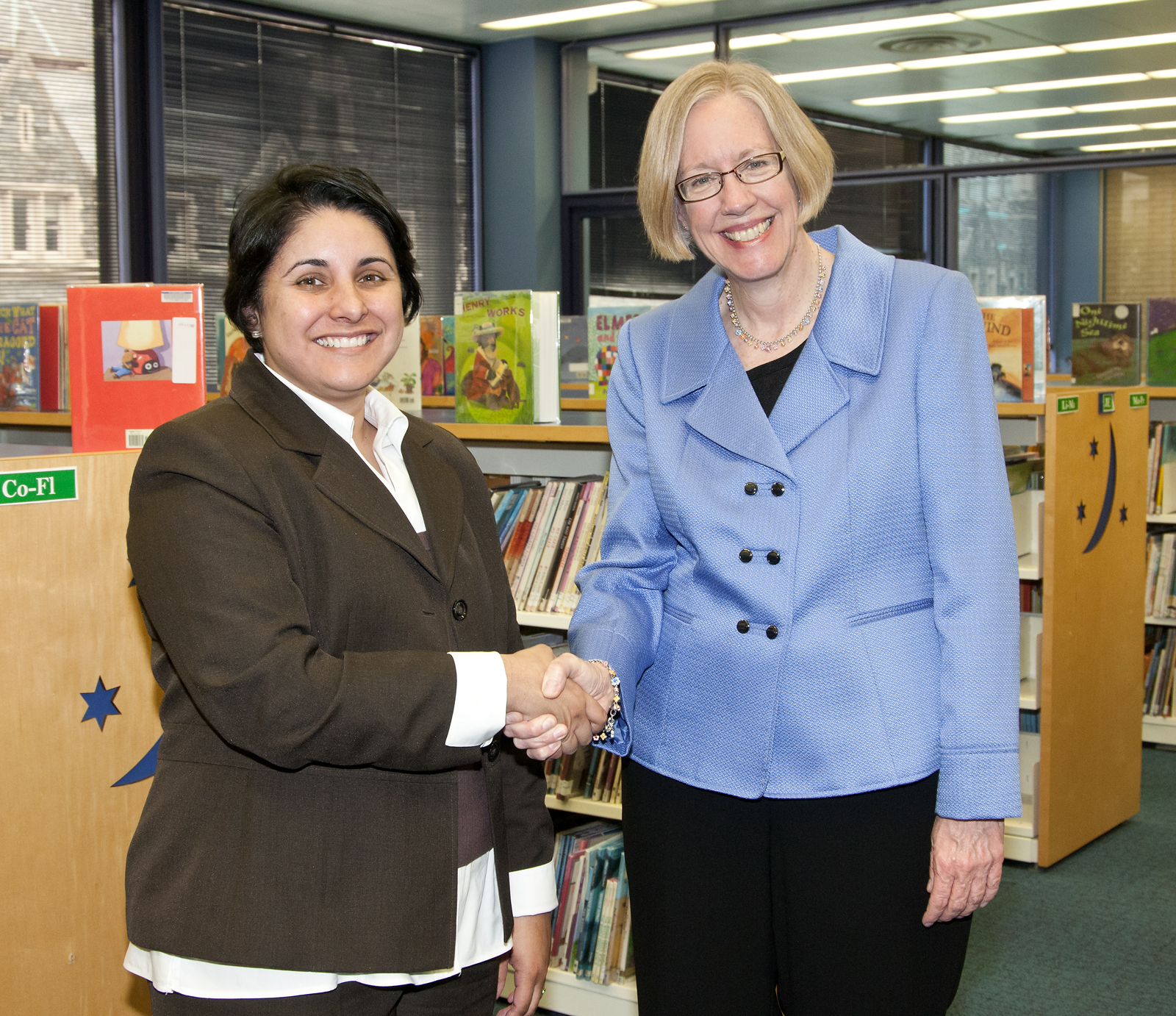
Director of the Office of Headstart Yvette Sanchez Fuentes (left) and IMLS Director Susan H. Hildreth shake on agreement at the Martin Luther King Jr. Memorial Library in 2012.

- Diane Frankel (1996)
- Robert S. Martin (2001)
- Anne-Imelda Radice (2006) Radice returned to IMLS in 2018 and currently serves as a senior advisor in the Office of the Director.
- Susan H. Hildreth (2011)
- Kathryn K. Matthew (2015)
- Crosby Kemper III (2020)
- Cyndee Landrum (Acting Director) (2024)
- Keith E. Sonderling (Acting Director) (2025)

== National Museum and Library Services Board ==
IMLS and the director are advised by the National Museum and Library Services Board, The board, a 24-member advisory body that includes the IMLS director, the deputy director for the Office of Library Services, the deputy director for the Office of Museum Services, the general counsel, and 20 presidentially appointed individuals, advises on general policy and practices and helps with the selections for the National Medals for Museum and Library Service.

=== Current members ===
The council members as of May 24, 2026:

Position	Name	Notes
Chair (non-voting) (ex officio)	Keith Sonderling (acting)	Director, IMLS
Member	Vacant	
Member	Vacant	
Member	Vacant	
Member	Vacant	
Member	Vacant	
Member	Vacant	
Member	Vacant	
Member	Vacant	
Member	Vacant	
Member	Vacant	
Member	Vacant	
Member	Vacant	
Member	Vacant	
Member	Vacant	
Member	Vacant	
Member	Vacant	
Member	Vacant	
Member	Vacant	
Member	Vacant	
Member	Vacant	
Member (non-voting) (ex officio)	Lisa Solomson	Deputy Director for Library Services, IMLS
Member (non-voting) (ex officio)	Katherine Maas	Deputy Director for Museum Services, IMLS
Member (non-voting) (ex officio)	Thomas M. Browder III	General Counsel, IMLS

== Strategic plan ==
The Institute of Museums and Library Services Strategic Plan for 2022-2026 has four major components: 1) Champion Lifelong Learning; 2) Strengthen Community Engagement; 3) Advance Collections Stewardship and Advancement and 4) Demonstrate Excellence in Public Service.

== Grants ==
The Institute of Museum and Library Services offers numerous grants for museums, libraries, and other cultural heritage institutions. The grants support the IMLS's strategic goals of advancing "innovation, lifelong learning, and cultural and civic engagement."

The Agency’s discretionary grants are selected through a highly respected and competitive peer review process, drawing on professionals located across the nation. This work enables museums and libraries located in geographically and economically diverse areas to deliver essential services that make it possible for individuals and communities to flourish.

=== Office of Library Services ===
The Office of Library Services (OLS) supports the recruitment, training, and development of library staff, boards, and volunteers, helping to grow a skilled, professional workforce. OLS enhances library resources that foster early, digital, information, health, financial, media, civic, and other types of literacies, and encourages library and museum professionals and institutions to share and adopt best practices and innovations. IMLS is the largest source of federal funding for libraries in the nation.

==== Grants To States ====
The Grants to States program is the largest source of federal funding support for library services in the United States. IMLS funds enable State Library Administrative Agencies (SLAAs) to advance library services throughout all 50 states, the District of Columbia, the US territories, and Freely Associated States. The program cuts across all geographies and all community types with population-based formula grants administered through the SLAAs. The program also addresses a variety of different types of agency priorities, including broadband access and advancing digital literacy, workforce development, learning and education, civic engagement, climate change, and services that address historic and growing inequities.

Each year, approximately 1,500 Grants to States projects support the purposes and priorities outlined in the Library Services and Technology Act (LSTA). SLAAs may distribute the funds through competitive subawards to, or through cooperative agreements with, public, academic, research, school, or special libraries or consortia (for-profit and federal libraries are not eligible).

==== Discretionary Library Grants ====
The Office of Library Services offers five funding opportunities: National Leadership Grants for Libraries, Native American Library Services: Basic Grants, Native American Library Services: Enhancement Grants, Native Hawaiian Library Services Grants, and Laura Bush 21st Century Librarian Program.

=== Office of Museum Services ===
The Office of Museum Services (OMS) supports the recruitment, training, and development of museum staff, boards, and volunteers, helping to grow a skilled, professional workforce. OMS enhances museum resources that foster early, digital, information, health, financial, media, civic, and other types of literacies.

Museums cover varying disciplines, and come in many sizes, including zoos, aquariums, botanical gardens, and arboretums; nature and science centers; history museums and historic sites; art museums; children’s museums; natural history museums; and specialized museums.

==== Museum Discretionary Grants ====
The Office of Museum Services offers seven competitive funding opportunities: Museums for America; Inspire! Grants for Small Museums and Museums Empowered (two special initiatives of the Museums for America program); 21st Century Museum Professional; National Leadership Grants for Museums; Native American/Native Hawaiian Museum Services; and Museum Grants for African American History and Culture, as well as the new Museum Grants for American Latino History and Culture.

==== American Latino Museum Internship and Fellowship Initiative ====
This initiative is designed to provide opportunities for internships and fellowships at American Latino museums for students enrolled in Institutions of Higher Education, including Hispanic-Serving Institutions. The initiative will nurture students carrying out studies relating to American Latino life, art, history, and culture.

==== Collections Assessment For Preservation Program (CAP) ====
CAP is administered by the Foundation for Advancement in Conservation (FAIC). Program provides small and mid-sized museums with partial funding toward an assessment of their policies and procedures relating to collections care and a study of their collections, buildings, and building systems.

==== Museum Assessment Program (MAP) ====
MAP is supported through a cooperative agreement between IMLS and the American Alliance of Museums. MAP offers museums an opportunity to strengthen operations and plan for the future through a low-cost, year-long process of self-assessment and consultative peer review.

== Public programs and special initiatives ==
=== IMLS250: All Stories, All People, All Places. ===
Gearing up for America250, the nationwide commemoration of America’s 250th anniversary in 2026, IMLS has launched IMLS250: All Stories, All People, All Places.

=== Information Literacy Taskforce ===
IMLS is convening an interagency taskforce and facilitating the development of a portal of resources bridging information literacy research and practice to advance information literacy within communities. This Information Literacy Taskforce is charged with helping libraries and community organizations support the challenges, faced by people of all ages, of a lack of literacy in many areas, from health, climate, and finance to civic engagement and public safety.

=== National Medal for Museum and Library Service ===
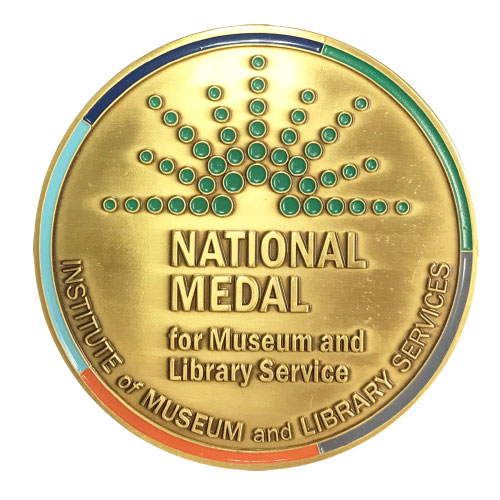
U.S. highest honor for institutions that make significant and exceptional contributions to their communities.

National Medal for Museum and Library Service is the “nation’s highest honor for institutions that make significant and exceptional contributions to their communities.” Since 1994, IMLS has presented the award to 182 outstanding libraries and museums of all types and sizes that deeply impact their communities. On May 23, 2023, IMLS announced eight winners for the 2023 National Medal for Museum and Library Service.

==== Libraries ====
- Kuskokwim Consortium Library (Bethel, AK)
- LA County Library (Los Angeles, CA)
- Long Branch Free Public Library (Long Branch, NJ)
- Toledo-Lucas County Public Library (Toledo, OH)

Museums:

- COSI: Center of Science and Industry (Columbus, OH)
- Jim Gatchell Memorial Museum (Buffalo, WY)
- Museum of Discovery and Science (Fort Lauderdale, FL)
- Riverside Art Museum (Riverside, CA)

The award is typically presented by the First Lady of the United States. On July 17, 2023, First Lady Jill Biden hosted the 2023 National Medal for Museum and Library Service ceremony.

=== National Student Poets Program ===
This is the nation’s highest honor for youth poets presenting original work. This partnership between IMLS and the Alliance for Young Artists & Writers recognizes student poets’ achievements at the national level and highlights the importance of literacy. Each year, a national panel of literary luminaries selects five National Student Poets from gold and silver national medalists in the poetry category of the Scholastic Art & Writing Awards. The young poets, nominated while in grades 10 and 11, are appointed at a special ceremony. During their year of service, the poets lead readings and workshops at libraries, museums, and schools, and participate in a range of regional literary and arts events. Representing five geographical regions of the nation, the 2023 National Student Poets are:

- Jacqueline Flores (Southeast), Fort Meade Middle Senior High School, Zolfo Springs, FL
- Miles Hardingwood (Northeast), Hunter College High School, Brooklyn, NY
- Shangri-La Hou (Midwest), John Burroughs School, Saint Louis, MO
- Kallan McKinney (Southwest), Norman High School, Norman, OK
- Gabriella Miranda (West), Rowland Hall, Salt Lake City, UT

On November 13, 2023, First Lady Jill Biden honored the Class of 2023 National Student Poets at the White House in Washington, DC.

=== Save America's Treasures ===
Save America's Treasures is a National Park Service grant program in collaboration with IMLS, the National Endowment for the Arts, and the National Endowment for the Humanities. Designed to support the preservation of nationally significant historic properties and collections, the grant program is competitive and requires a dollar-for-dollar match. Individual properties or collections that received an SAT grant in the past are not eligible for additional funding.

=== Museums for All ===
Museums for All is a partnership between IMLS and the Association of Children’s Museums that encourages low-income families to visit museums and build lifelong museum habits. Participating museums offer free or greatly reduced admission fees year-round to Supplemental Nutrition Assistance Program (SNAP) Electronic Benefit Transfer (EBT) cardholders. To date, the program comprises over 1,400 museums making free or discounted museum visits possible for over 5,000,000 children and families across the United States.

=== National Tribal Broadband Summit ===
The National Tribal Broadband Summit is part of the Biden-Harris administration’s ongoing efforts to close the digital divide and builds on an all-of-government approach to uplift Tribal sovereignty in the digital arena to ensure Tribal lands are fully connected. The Summit aims to collaborate with federal partners, Tribal nations, and organizations to make broadband development on Tribal lands less burdensome and share information to provide an overview of the other critical components to achieving full broadband access and adoption on Tribal Lands: new technologies and innovative partnership solutions to fully support tribal self-governance.

=== Communities for Immunity ===
IMLS partnered with the Centers for Disease Control and Prevention (CDC) to boost COVID-19 vaccine confidence in communities across the United States. With support from CDC and IMLS, the Association of Science and Technology Centers (ASTC), in collaboration with the American Alliance of Museums (AAM), launched Communities for Immunity to provide funding to museums and libraries to enhance vaccine confidence at the local level.

=== REopening Archives, Libraries and Museums (REALM) ===
OCLC, IMLS, and Battelle are working together to create and distribute science-based information and recommended practices to reduce the risk of transmission of COVID-19 for museums, libraries, and archives.

== Research ==
The Office of Research and Evaluation (ORE) supports IMLS's efforts to create strong libraries and museums that connect people to information and ideas. ORE executes three key functions: policy research, evaluations, and surveys & data.

Key initiatives include the evaluation of the Grants to States program and the data collections for the Public Libraries Survey and State Library Agency Survey.

ORE's functions are detailed in Section 9108 of IMLS’ authorizing legislation, which states that IMLS “collaborate and consult with state library agencies, library and museum organizations, and other relevant agencies and organizations to conduct our research, evaluations, and data collections.”

The legislation further states that IMLS “use the research to identify national needs for and trends in museum and library services, measure and report on the services' impact and effectiveness, identify best practices, and develop plans to improve them.”

=== Survey and data collection ===
- Data Catalog – Data relating to grants administration and data about libraries, museums, and related organizations.
- Public Library Survey (PLS) – collects data from 9,000 public library systems and 17,000 public library outlets.
- State Library Agency Survey (SLAA) – provides descriptive data about state libraries.
- Public Needs for Library and Museum Services Survey (PNLMS) – measures "expectations and satisfaction" with cultural heritage institutions through a household survey.
- Museum Data File (MDF) – contains information about cultural heritage institutions in the United States.
- Administration Discretionary Grant Data – Records of grants funded by IMLS since FY 1996.

== Legislative history ==
=== Museum and Library Services Act of 1996 ===
The Museum and Library Services Act (MLSA) of 1996 established the Institute of Museum and Library Services within the National Foundation on the Arts and Humanities. The new Agency combined the former Institute of Museum Services and federal museum programs, which had been in existence since 1976, with the Library Programs Office and federal library program that had been part of the Department of Education since 1956.

=== Museum and Library Services Act of 2003 ===
On September 25, 2003, the Museum and Library Services Act of 2003 (PL 108-81) was signed into law. Recognizing the effectiveness of the new Agency, this legislation reauthorized federal appropriations for IMLS. But the framers of the 2003 law also sought to capitalize on lessons learned since 1996 by amending the initial MLSA in several ways, including the establishment of the National Museum and Library Services Board and incorporating new authority for research and evaluation.

=== National Museum of African American History and Culture Act of 2003 ===
On December 16, 2003, the National Museum of African American History and Culture Act was signed into law. In addition to providing authority to create a new Smithsonian museum for African American History and Culture, the Act authorizes $15M per year for IMLS to carry out its statutory purpose of enhancing the vitality and sustainability of museums of African American History and Culture and encouraging scholarship and careers in African American history and culture.

=== 2008 Consolidated Appropriations Act of 2008 ===
Congress passed the Consolidated Appropriations Act of 2008 providing IMLS with the authority to carry out the functions of the former National Commission on Libraries and Information Science, to streamline the Agency, and strengthen library services and policy in the Federal government. In addition, the Act provided funding to enable the Institute to assume responsibility for two library statistics programs formerly housed at the National Center for Educational Statistics at the United States Department of Education.

=== 2010 Museum and Library Services Act of 2010 ===
On December 22, 2010, the Museum and Library Services Act of 2010 (PL 111-340) was signed into law. The legislation reauthorized the existing programs of the Institute of Museum and Library Services with some important changes. The updated language calls on IMLS to take an active role in research and data collection and to advise the President and Congress on museum, library, and information services. This Act also expressly recognizes how libraries and museums contribute to a competitive workforce and engaged citizenry. New language focuses on the development of essential 21st century skills.

=== 2018 Museum and Library Services Act of 2018 ===
On December 31, 2018, the Museum and Library Services Act of 2018 (PL 115-410) was signed into law. It reauthorized the existing programs and functions of the Institute of Museum and Library Services, and provided new authority, including to develop and support new museum, library, and information professionals.

=== 2020 National Museum of The American Latino Act ===
On December 27, 2020, the National Museum of the American Latino Act (“American Latino Act”) (PL116-260) was enacted into law. The legislation establishes grants and fellowship programs at IMLS to support American Latino Museums and related scholarship. It authorizes $15 million per year for IMLS to carry out its statutory purpose of recognizing, celebrating, and enhancing understanding of the important history and contributions of American Latinos.

== See also ==
- List of libraries in the United States
