= James Louis Gillis =

American librarian

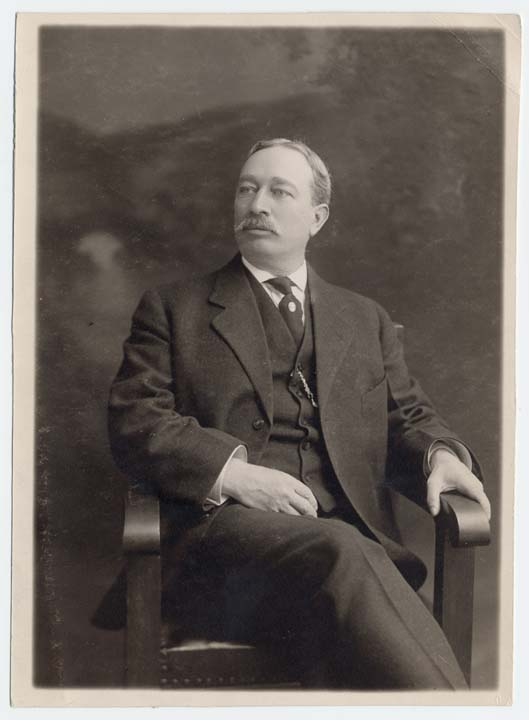
- Born: October 3, 1857; Washington County
- Died: July 27, 1917 (aged 59); Sacramento
- Occupation: Librarian
- Employer: California State Legislature; California State Library; Sacramento Valley Railroad
- Children: Mabel R. Gillis
- Awards: California Library Hall of Fame

James Louis Gillis (October 3, 1857 – July 27, 1917) was an American librarian.

== Biography ==
Gillis was born in Richmond, Iowa in 1857. By the time he was 14, his family had settled in Sacramento, California. Gillis then dropped out of school to become a messenger boy for a subsidiary of the Southern Pacific Railroad, the Sacramento Valley Railroad Company. After the Pullman railroad strike, Gillis retired from his position of assistant superintendent, having spent 22 years with Southern Pacific.

Gillis was extremely active with the Republican party when he retired, and because of connections he made politically, he became the archivist for the office of the Secretary of State of California in 1895. After a series of state positions, Gillis was appointed California State Librarian in 1899. Though most of his previous work experience did not include library topics, Gillis was nonetheless attracted to the job. Librarian Anne Margrave stated,

His sense of humor made him joke a little at himself as State Librarian, considering his limited education and his previous experience, which had had little indeed to do with libraries. He had laughed heartily, he said, when someone first suggested that he seek the appointment [as State Librarian]. But as he thought it over, he began to think it would be rather a good job to bring order out of chaos, which was the condition then of the California State Library.

Gillis was interested in organizing the chaotic library system and wanted it to benefit the whole community, not just capital officials. He served as California State Librarian from 1899 until his death in 1917. In that role, Gillis expanded the State Library's services, established the California History Room, the California Research Bureau, a traveling library program, and library services for the blind in the state of California. He also established California's county library system in 1909.

Gillis served as the President of the California Library Association from 1906 to 1916. He was inducted into the California Library Hall of Fame in 2012.

== Publications ==
- California county free library law (1911)
- Descriptive list of the libraries of California (1904)
- Library laws of the state of California (1903)
