= Joseph Steffens House =

Historic house in Illinois, United States

- U.S. National Register of Historic Places
- Location within Illinois Location within the United States
- Nearest city: Milledgeville, Illinois
- Coordinates: 41°57′59″N 89°43′3″W
- Area: less than one acre
- Built: 1843
- Built by: Joseph Steffens
- Architectural style: Rammed Earth
- NRHP reference No.: 85000771
- Added to NRHP: April 10, 1985

The Joseph Steffens House is a historic house located in eastern Carroll County, Illinois, east of Milledgeville. Settler Joseph Steffens built the rammed earth house in 1843; it is the only surviving rammed earth house in the state. Rammed earth construction uses soil to build walls by pressurizing it in molds; the method was common in continental Europe and saw some use in 18th-century eastern America and in the Great Plains and Southwest during the Great Depression, though it was rare in Illinois. While Steffens claimed that he borrowed the construction method from his former house in Canada, he was also likely influenced by American authors who promoted the method and a local timber shortage.

The house was added to the National Register of Historic Places on April 10, 1985.

This house no longer stands; there is no existing structure. It collapsed in the late 2000s. This site is now a cornfield.
