= California State Library =

State library of California, United States

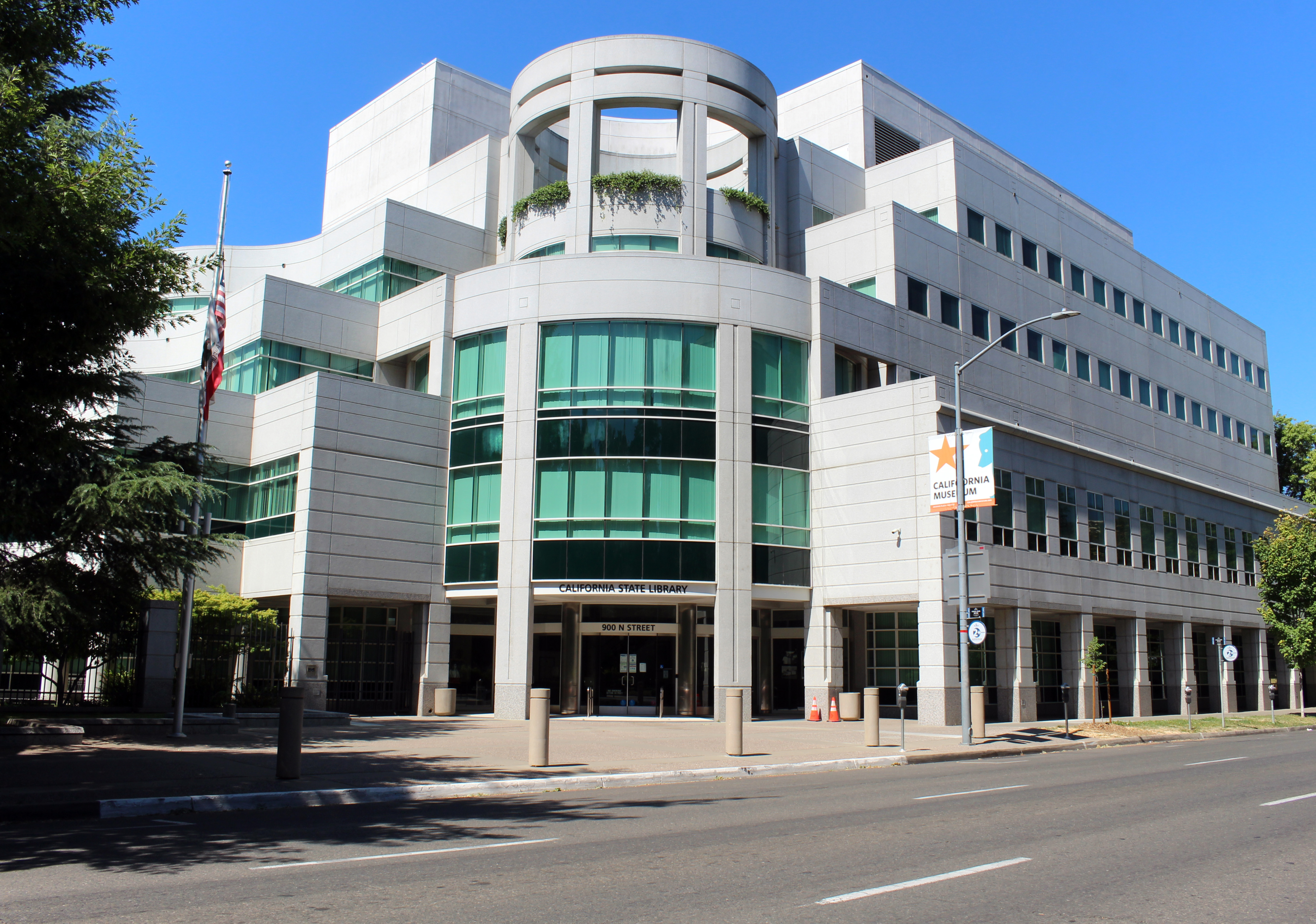
- California State Library
- 38°34′35″N 121°29′46″W
- Location: Sacramento, California
- Type: Government
- Established: 1850; 176 years ago

Collection
- Size: Over 5 million items

Other information
- Director: Greg Lucas, State Librarian
- Website: library.ca.gov

The California State Library is the state library of the U.S. state of California. It was founded in 1850 by the California State Legislature. The library collects, preserves, generates and disseminates a wide array of information. It is the central reference and research library for the state government and legislature.

The California State Library advises, consults with and provides technical assistance to California's public libraries. It directs state and federal funds to support local public libraries and statewide library programs, including Institute of Museum and Library Services (IMLS) grants.

Two of its branches are located in Sacramento, California, at 914 Capitol Mall and 900 N Street. A third branch, located in the California State Capitol, closed in 2020 in preparation for the demolition of the Annex and is expected to return when the new building is completed. The Sutro Library is in the San Francisco State University library building.

== Services to the public ==
The California State Library makes a wide range of services available to Californians. The library provides reference services to visitors of the library, as well as those contacting the California State Library via phone, fax, letter, email or TDD. Visitors are welcome to use the library collections on site. The library's circulating materials are loaned to the public through local libraries. Other services include Braille and recorded books, use of computers with internet access, online access to the library catalogs, and California state information.

The California State Library uses the OCLC symbols CAX and SUTRO.

=== California Revealed ===
The California State Library also funds California Revealed, a digitization initiative that helps public libraries, archives, museums, historical societies, and other community heritage groups in California preserve and provide online access to materials documenting the state’s history, art, and cultures. Since its launch in 2010, the initiative has been expanded to provide financial assistance for community outreach and education, cataloging and processing projects, as well as free access and preservation services for existing digital collections. It has helped digitize and upload materials to Calisphere.

== Library sections ==
There are eight sections of the California State Library: The Bernard E. Witkin State Law Library, Braille and Talking Book Library, the California History Room, the California Research Bureau, Government Publications, Information Services, Library Development Services Bureau, and the Sutro Library.

=== Bernard E. Witkin State Law Library ===
The law library collection contains standard primary and secondary legal resources in American law. Materials in the collection include federal and state appellate court decisions, session laws, codes/statutes, federal agency decisions, and Attorney General opinions of the U.S. and the fifty jurisdictions. These primary sources are supplemented by federal digests, the Pacific Digest, federal and regional citators, legal encyclopedias, law journals and periodicals, and current practice materials.

=== Braille and Talking Book Library ===
This service is affiliated with the National Library Service for the Blind and Physically Handicapped of the Library of Congress. It loans recorded and Braille books and magazines to Northern Californians who cannot read standard print due to visual or physical limitations. Special players to listen to the books are also loaned. The reading room houses assistive devices such as print magnifiers and scanners with voice output. The borrowing of materials in this collection is limited to eligible customers specially registered for the service. The California State Library has been providing braille and "talking books" since the 1930s, promoting their services through local libraries throughout the state of California.

=== California History Room ===
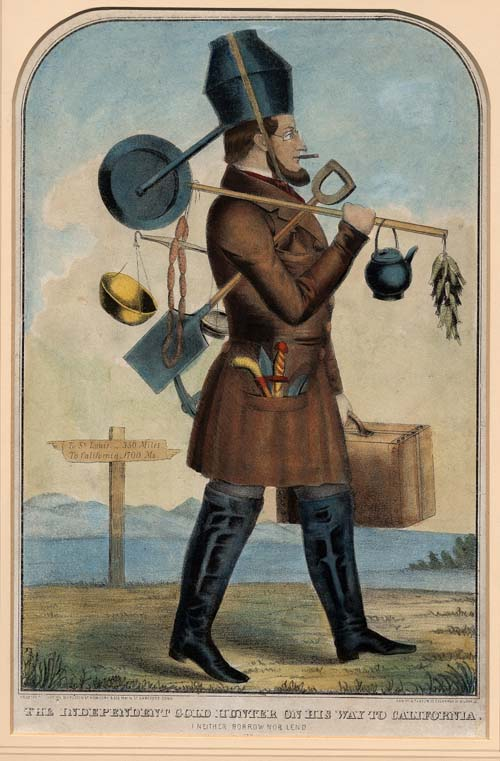
Independent gold miner on his way to California. New York: Kelloggs and Comstock; Buffalo: Ensign & Thayer, c. 1850. Hand-tinted lithograph, 12 x 8 in.

The California History Room has current and historical information on California people, places and events. Materials in the collection include California phone books and city directories, California periodicals, newspapers and newspaper indexes, information files, pioneer letters, and information on California genealogy. One special collection available here that is not limited to California is the American Haiku Archives, which includes books, papers, letters, and other material relating to haiku poetry by poets from around North America. This archive is the world's largest public collection of haiku and related materials outside Japan.

=== California Research Bureau ===
The California Research Bureau prepares in-depth research reports on policy questions of interest to state officials. These non-partisan reports examine a broad spectrum of research and policy options and do not advocate a particular viewpoint. Each report includes essential background information, key data developed by CRB and other researchers, and a summary of the policy debate.

=== Government Publications Section ===
The Government Publications Section includes a full federal depository library and the state's largest collection of California state government publications. The section serves as the sole regional depository for, and largest collection of, federal documents in California. It receives all publications distributed by the U.S. Superintendent of Documents to federal depository libraries, along with purchasing supplementary microfiche collections relating to federal reports, studies and documents. The Government Publications section administers the California State Depository Library Program and receives all state publications subject to the California Library Distribution Act. It is also an official Patent and Trademark Resource Center.

=== Information Services ===
The Information Services staff manages the State Library's general, circulating and reference collections. Materials in the collection are primarily in subject areas of interest to State government such as business, education, environment, industry standards, personnel training and development, management, public policy, social sciences and technology.

=== Library Development Services Bureau ===
The Library Development Services Bureau provides state and federal financial assistance to California libraries and provides technical consulting assistance to help local libraries extend and improve services to all Californians. The foundational work for this program was done by Harriet G. Eddy.

The primary assistance programs of the Library Development Services Bureau include: Library Services and Technology Act (LSTA), a federal program which provides grants to libraries for innovative library services, technological development, services for underserved populations, library networking and resource sharing; Public Library Fund, a funding program under which the state contributes funding for basic local library services under specified conditions; California Library Literacy Services, which works to enable Californians of all ages to reach their literacy goals and use library services effectively; and California Library Services Act (CLSA), a program that helps public libraries and cooperative public library systems provide coordinated information services, supports communication and delivery among libraries, and provides reimbursement for interlibrary loans of materials and direct loans to non-resident borrowers.

=== Sutro Library ===
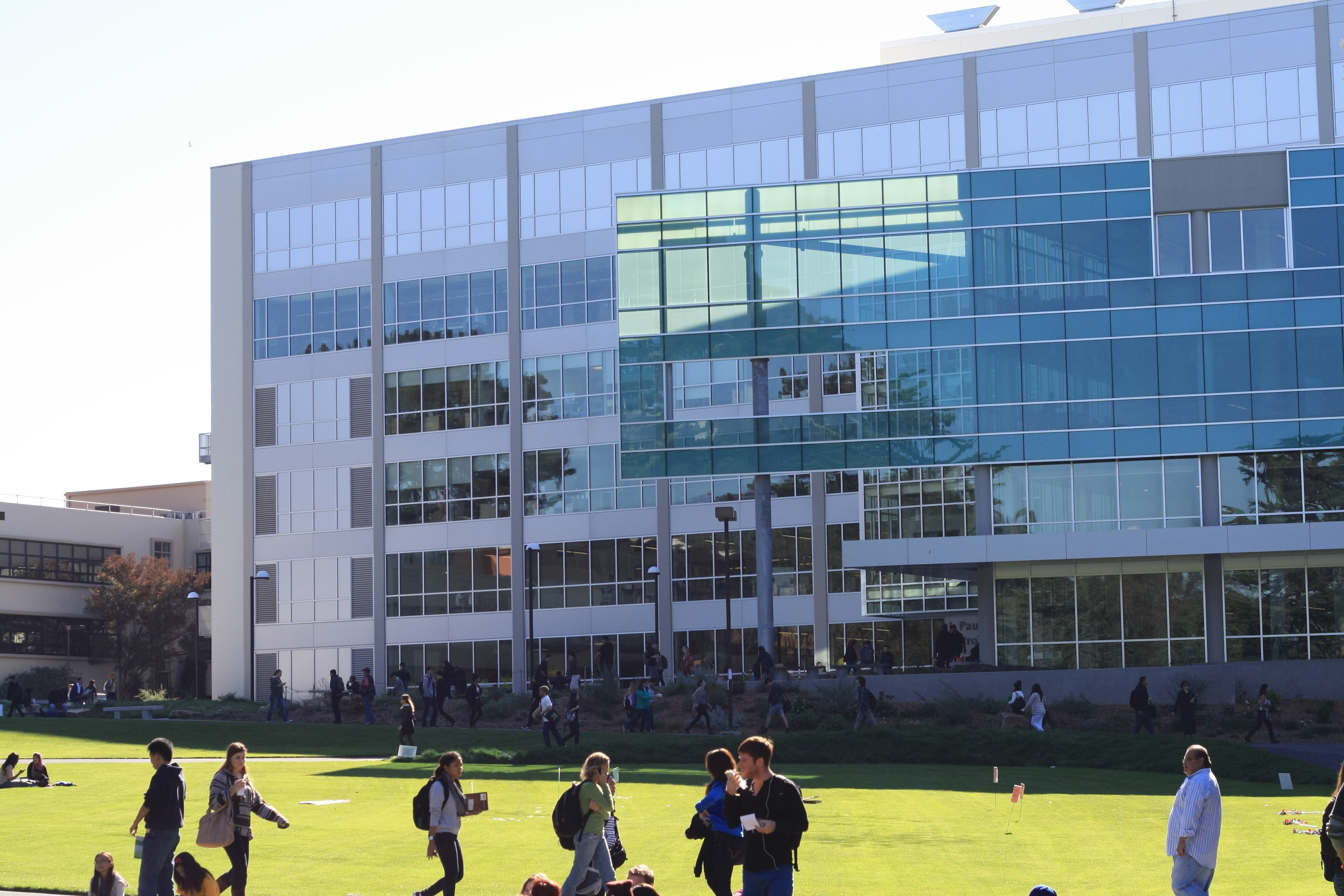
San Francisco State University library building

Sutro Library, located in San Francisco, has a collection of genealogical resources, such as state and local histories, and family histories. Apart from genealogical records for California, Sutro has records for all other states, including the U.S. Census from 1790 to 1920 (on microfilm) and materials helpful in tracing genealogy in foreign countries. The collection was built upon the donation of Adolph Sutro, and contains many rare books. Sutro further emphasizes British studies of science, voyages and travels prior to 1900, Mexican history, and Hebraica. The Sutro Library is located on the 5th Floor of the San Francisco State University library building.

== State librarians ==
From 1850 to 1861, the Secretary of State of California served as the state librarian in an ex-officio capacity. In 1861, a state librarian was hired to assist with the daily operations of the library. The state librarian was appointed by the State Library Board of Trustees from 1861 to 1927. Since 1927, the state librarian has been appointed by the Governor of California.

- W. C. Stratton (1861–1870)
- William Neely Johnson (1870)
- Robert O. Cravens (1870–1882)
- Talbot H. Wallis (1882–1890)
- W. Dana Perkins (1890–1896)
- William P. Mathews (1896–1897)
- Edward D. McCabe (1897–1898)
- Frank Coombs (1898–1899)
- James Louis Gillis (1899–1917)
- Milton J. Ferguson (1917–1930)
- Mabel R. Gillis (1930–1951)
- Carma Leigh (1951–1972)
- Ethel S. Crockett (1972–1980)
- Gary E. Strong (1980–1994)
- Kevin Starr (1994–2004)
- Susan H. Hildreth (2004–2009)
- Stacey A. Aldrich (2009–2012)
- Gerald Maginnity (2012–2014)
- Greg Lucas (2014–present)

== See also ==
- List of libraries in the United States
