= Joyce Sumbi =

American librarian (1935–2010)

- Born: Joyce Annette Madkins; October 23, 1935; Oklahoma, US
- Died: July 17, 2010 (aged 74); Los Angeles, California, US
- Occupation: Librarian
- Employer: LA County Library
- Known for: President, California Librarians Black Caucus

Joyce Annette Madkins Sumbi (October 23, 1935 – July 17, 2010) was an American librarian. She was the first African-American administrator in the LA County Library system.

== Early life ==
Joyce Annette Madkins was born in Oklahoma and raised in Merced, California, the daughter of Raymond Madkins Sr. and Pearl Lofton Madkins. Both of her parents were from Oklahoma; her mother was a nurse. Joyce Madkins trained as a teacher at Fresno State University. In 1960 she earned a master's degree in library science from the University of Southern California.

== Career ==
Sumbi began her career as an elementary school teacher in San Diego. Unhappy with the instability of the parent and student body, she resigned after one year, moved to Los Angeles, and obtained a master's degree in library science in order to join the LA County Library system. She remained in the system for 32 years until her retirement. She became the first African American administrator in the county library system. "Probably, I was the first African American librarian serving the public in a Los Angeles County community library," she said. "There were a few other African American librarians on the payroll, but they worked at headquarters behind the scene."

In 1971 she joined five black colleagues in charging the county library system with discrimination against minorities in job assignments and promotions. At the time, the system had 242 librarians, of which 13 were black and 4 were Hispanic. Sumbi was a founding member of the California Librarians Black Caucus in 1972.

In 1973 Sumbi was the Audio-Visual Librarian at the Los Cerritos branch. She was involved in leading the Our Authors Study Club, a group dedicated to promoting black history and culture in Los Angeles. In 1991, she was involved in a controversy about a Langston Hughes quote, used on a poster about gay history. Librarian Elizabeth Martinez recalled Sumbi as "the compass who calmly brought reality to our work" in the Way Out Project, a federal grant to bring cultural programming to Chicano and African-American libraries in Los Angeles.

== Honors and awards ==
In 1994 Sumbi was named a Living History Maker by Turning Point magazine, and won the Phyllis Wheatley Award from International Black Writers and Artists. In 2003 she received a President Award from the USC Alumni Association, for serving on the board of directors of the university's Black Alumni Association from its founding in 1976. She also received recognition from the American Library Association, the YWCA Greater Los Angeles, the Mayor's office, and others. In 2008, she gave an oral history interview for the UCLA Center for Oral History Research.

== Personal life ==
Sumbi had three sons, David, Paul, and James. She died in 2010, aged 75 years, at her home in Los Angeles. The California Librarians Black Caucus presents a Joyce Madkins Sumbi Emerging Leaders Award at the Leimert Park Book Fair, an event she helped to create. She was inducted into the California Library Hall of Fame in 2024.
