= Lippincott =

Lippincott may refer to:

== Arts and media ==
- Lippincott's Monthly Magazine a 19th-century literary magazine published in Philadelphia, U.S.
- Andy Lippincott, a fictional character in the comic strip Doonesbury
- "Lippincott", a song by Animals as Leaders from the album The Joy of Motion, 2014

== Businesses ==
- J. B. Lippincott & Co., an American publishing company founded in 1836
  - Lippincott Williams & Wilkins, successor company, formed in 1998
- Lippincott (brand consultancy), an American brand strategy and design company

== People ==
- Charles E. Lippincott (1825–1887), American physician and politician
- David McCord Lippincott (1924–1984), American composer and lyricist
- Donald Lippincott (1893–1963), American athlete
- Esther J. Trimble Lippincott (1838–1888), American educator, reformer, author
- Janet Lippincott (1918–2007), American artist
- Joan Lippincott (1935–2025), American concert organist and organ professor
- Job H. Lippincott (1842–1900), American lawyer
- Joshua Lippincott (1835–1906), Chancellor of the University of Kansas 1883–1889
- Joshua Ballinger Lippincott, founder of J. B. Lippincott & Co.
  - His grandson Joseph Wharton Lippincott (1887–1976), American publisher, author, naturalist, and sportsman
    - His son Joseph Wharton Lippincott Jr. (1914–2003), American publisher
- Kristen Lippincott, London-based art historian and curator
- Richard Lippincott (Quaker) (1615–1683), English Quaker and an early settler of Shrewsbury, New Jersey
- Richard Lippincott (Loyalist) (1745–1826), an American who fought for the Crown during the American War of Independence
- Sara Jane Lippincott (1823–1904), pseudonym Grace Greenwood, American author
- Sarah Lee Lippincott (1920–2019), American astronomer
- Lippincott baronets, a title in the Baronetage of Great Britain
  - Sir Henry Lippincott, 1st Baronet (1737–1780)

== Places ==
- Lippincott, Ohio, an unincorporated community
- Lippincott Library, housed in Van Pelt Library of Wharton School of the University of Pennsylvania, U.S.
- Lippincott Mansion, a historic site in Ormond Beach, Florida, U.S.
- John Lippincott House, a historic building in Davenport, Iowa, U.S.
- Lippincott Street, Harbord Village, Toronto, Ontario, Canada

== Other uses ==
- Ellis R. Lippincott Award, an annual award in vibrational spectroscopy
- Gertrude Lippincott Award, an annual award of the Society of Dance History Scholars
- Lippincott cap, or Ascot cap, a hat

== See also ==
- Lippincott Covered Bridge, a historic bridge in Morgan Township, Pennsylvania, U.S.
