= Public libraries in North America =

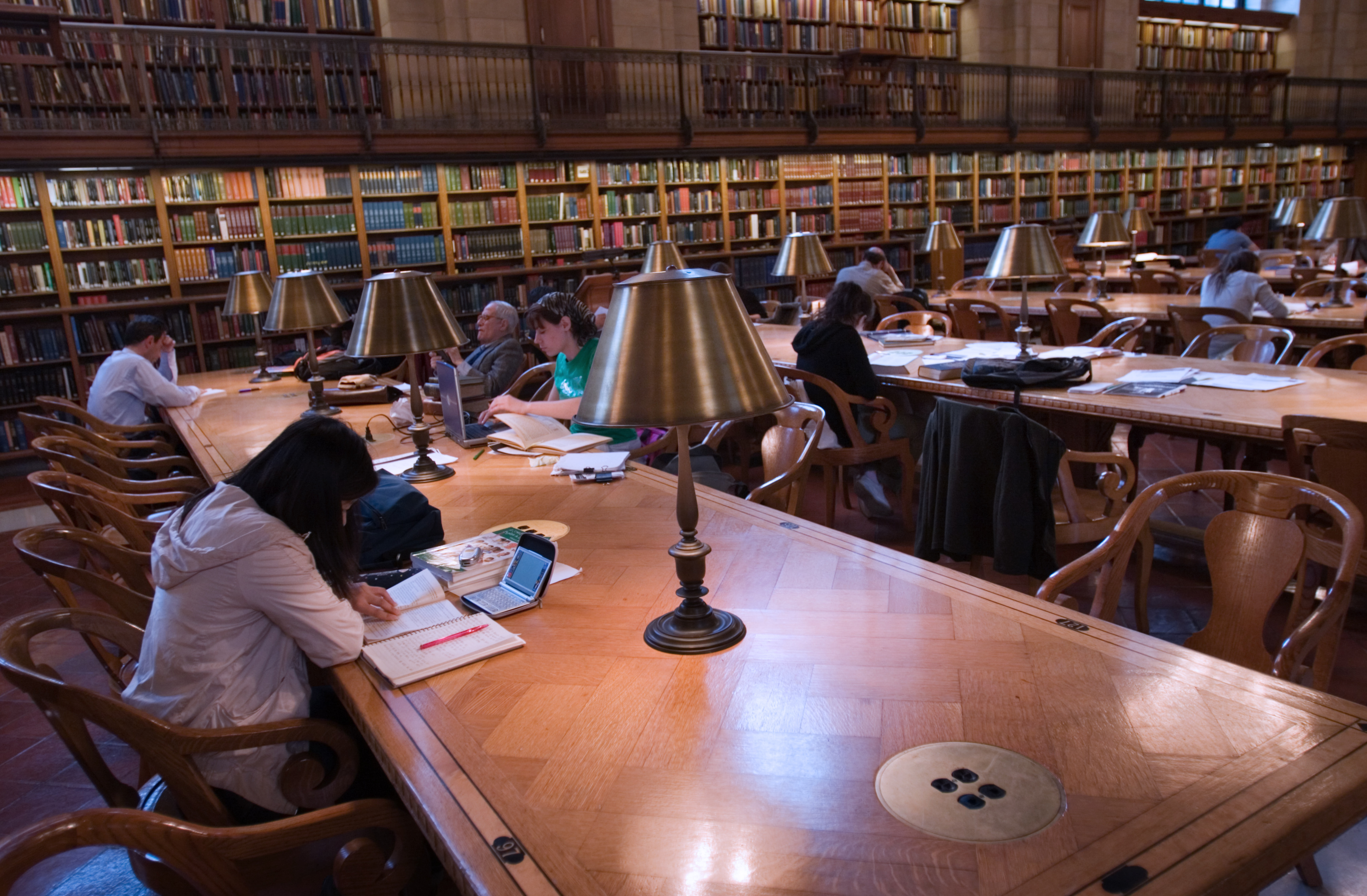
Patrons studying and reading at the New York City Public Library

A public library is a library that is accessible by the general public and is generally funded from public sources, such as taxes. It is operated by librarians and library paraprofessionals, who are also civil servants.

== United States ==
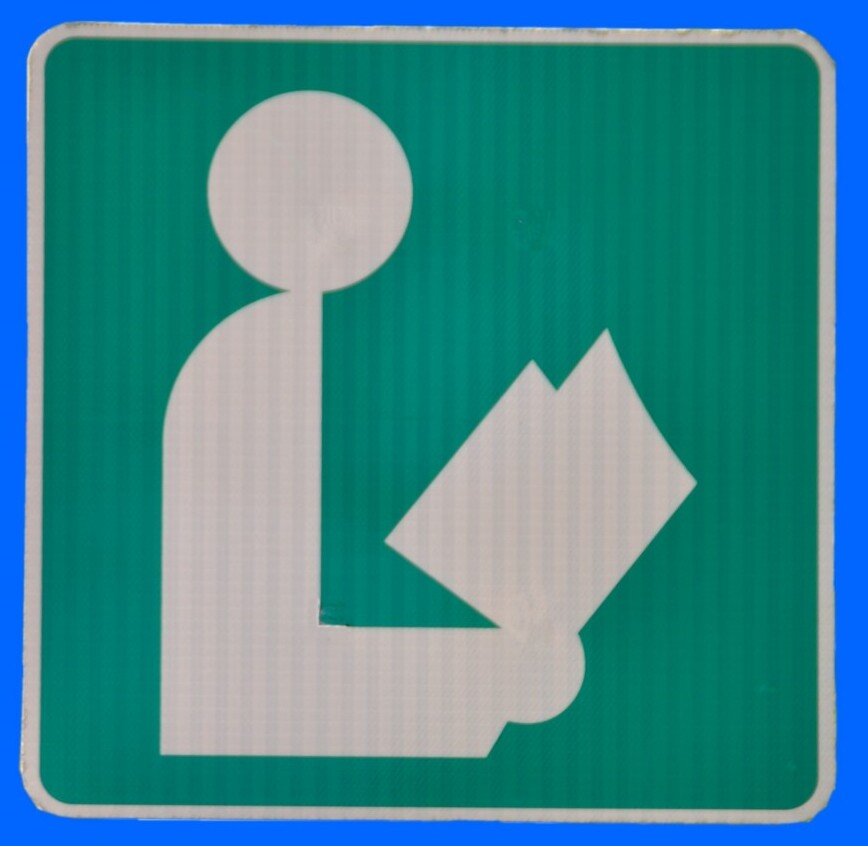
Street sign commonly used to point the way to a public library

As the United States developed from the 18th century, growing more populous and wealthier, factors such as a push for education and desire to share knowledge led to broad public support for free libraries. In addition, money donations by private philanthropists provided the seed capital to get many libraries started. In some instances, collectors donated large book collections.

=== First libraries ===
William James Sidis in The Tribes and the States claims the public library, as such, was an American invention.

There were parish (parochial) libraries open in Anglican churches all over the American colonies. The Society for the Propagation of the Gospel in Foreign Parts, founded in 1701, subsidized libraries as a regular part of their missionary activity whenever they sent a priest to an Anglican mission or church that did not have a library already. There would thus have been parish libraries at the 289 Anglican churches, and at various missions.

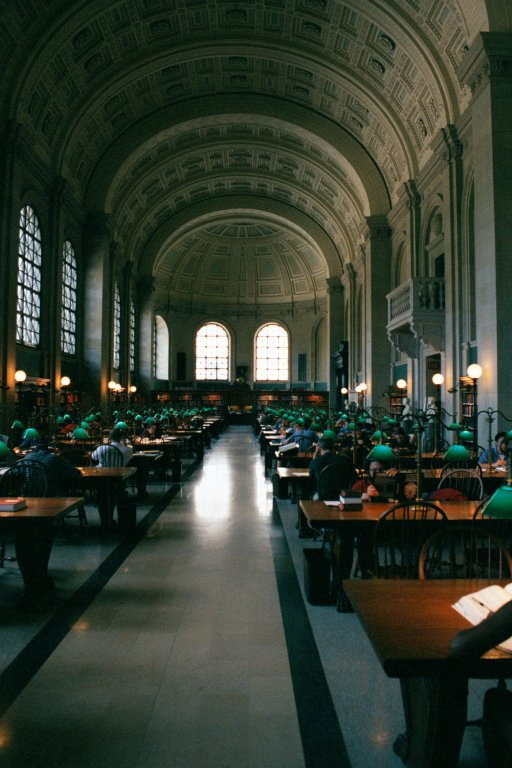
Bates Hall reading room in the Boston Public Library

According to Edmund Farwell Slafter, the first public library was founded in Boston by the Rev. John Checkley at the Old State House sometime between 1711 when Boston's Old State House was built, and 1725. In a letter to the Rev. Dr. Thomas Bennet, dated June 15, 1725, Checkley wrote:

In a short Time I propose to send you an account of the charitable Society of the Church of England, and of the public Library erected here: the laying the Foundation of both which, I have been (thanks to my good God) the happy tho' unworthy Instrument.

The library was destroyed when the Old State House interior was consumed by fire on December 9, 1747, when many books, papers, and records were destroyed.

There is evidence of other and possibly earlier public libraries. The Rev. John Sharpe, who had traveled as a missionary priest over the colonies from Maryland to Connecticut, thought the parish library in New York inadequate. He devised an advanced plan for a public library in New York City open to all. In a letter on March 11, 1713, he notes there were already at least four public libraries in the colonies including the one in Boston:

Another thing which is very much wanted here is a public Library, which would very much advance both learning and piety. Such there are at Charles Town in Carolina, Annapolis in Mary Land, at Philadelphia and Boston. Some books have been formerly sent to New York but as parochial they remain in the hands of the Incumbent.

He proposed the institution should be "publick and provincial" and "open every day in the week at convenient hours," when "all men may have liberty to read in the Library."

Just before returning to England in 1713 after a decade spent as a missionary priest in America, he left behind 238 of his volumes to be "given for the laying of a foundation of a Public Library." However, it wasn't until thirty years after Sharp left America that a dozen men in 1754 founded the New York Society Library with Sharp's books as its core. His advanced dream of a library open every day was not to be accomplished in New York until 1791.

In 1729, New York City formed its first public library. It was started with a donation of books from the Society for the Propagation of the Gospel. The Collection of Dr. Millington was presented for the library. Most but not all works were in relation to religion.

In 1731, Benjamin Franklin and the other members of the discussion club the Junto founded the Library Company of Philadelphia partly as a means to settle arguments and partly as a means to advance themselves through sharing information. Franklin's subscription library allowed members to buy "shares" and combined funds were used to buy more books; in return, members could borrow books and use the library. The Library Company continues to exist as a nonprofit, independent research library.

A town in Massachusetts named itself Franklin after the famous Bostonian. For this honor, Franklin donated 116 books to the town in lieu of a requested church bell. Franklin's town meeting voted to lend the books to all Franklin inhabitants free of charge in 1790, and this small collection can therefore be considered the first public library in the United States and is now known as the Franklin Public Library.

Dr. Jesse Torrey, Jr., of New Lebanon, New York, was one of the earliest advocates for free public libraries. In 1804 at the age of seventeen, he established the New Lebanon Juvenile Society for the Acquisition of Knowledge. The social library operated under a suggested user fee and was open to any youth between the ages of twelve and twenty-one. In 1817, Torrey published The Intellectual Torch, a treatise advocating for a national system of free public libraries. Torrey's plan included a tax on the import and export of alcohol to support local free schools and libraries.

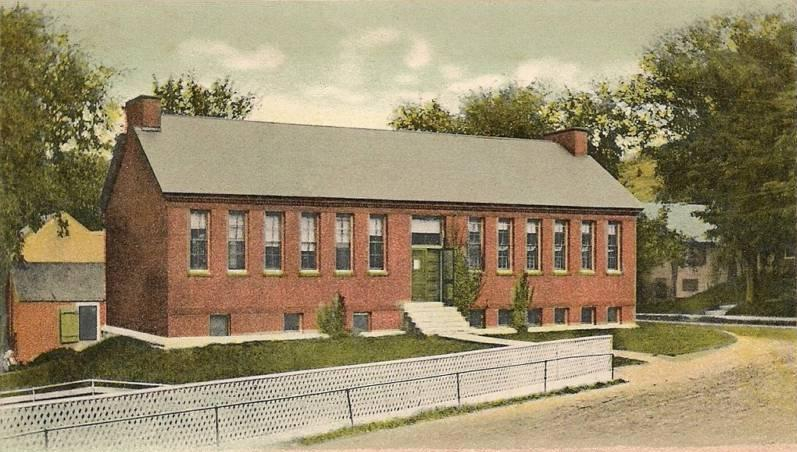
Peterborough Town Library, the first completely tax-supported public library in the United States, Peterborough, New Hampshire

The first free public library supported by taxation in the world was the Peterborough, New Hampshire Town Library which was founded at town meeting on April 9, 1833. Many sources claim to have been the first, such as Boston's Public Library, which was the second, established in 1852. The Boston Public Library opened on March 20, 1854. The first free continuous children's library in the United States was funded privately, founded in 1835 in Arlington, Massachusetts.

New York lawyer, governor and bibliophile Samuel J. Tilden bequeathed millions to build the New York Public Library. He believed Americans should have access to books and a free education if desired. In 1902, one account suggested "the village library is growing more and more an indispensable adjunct to American village life."

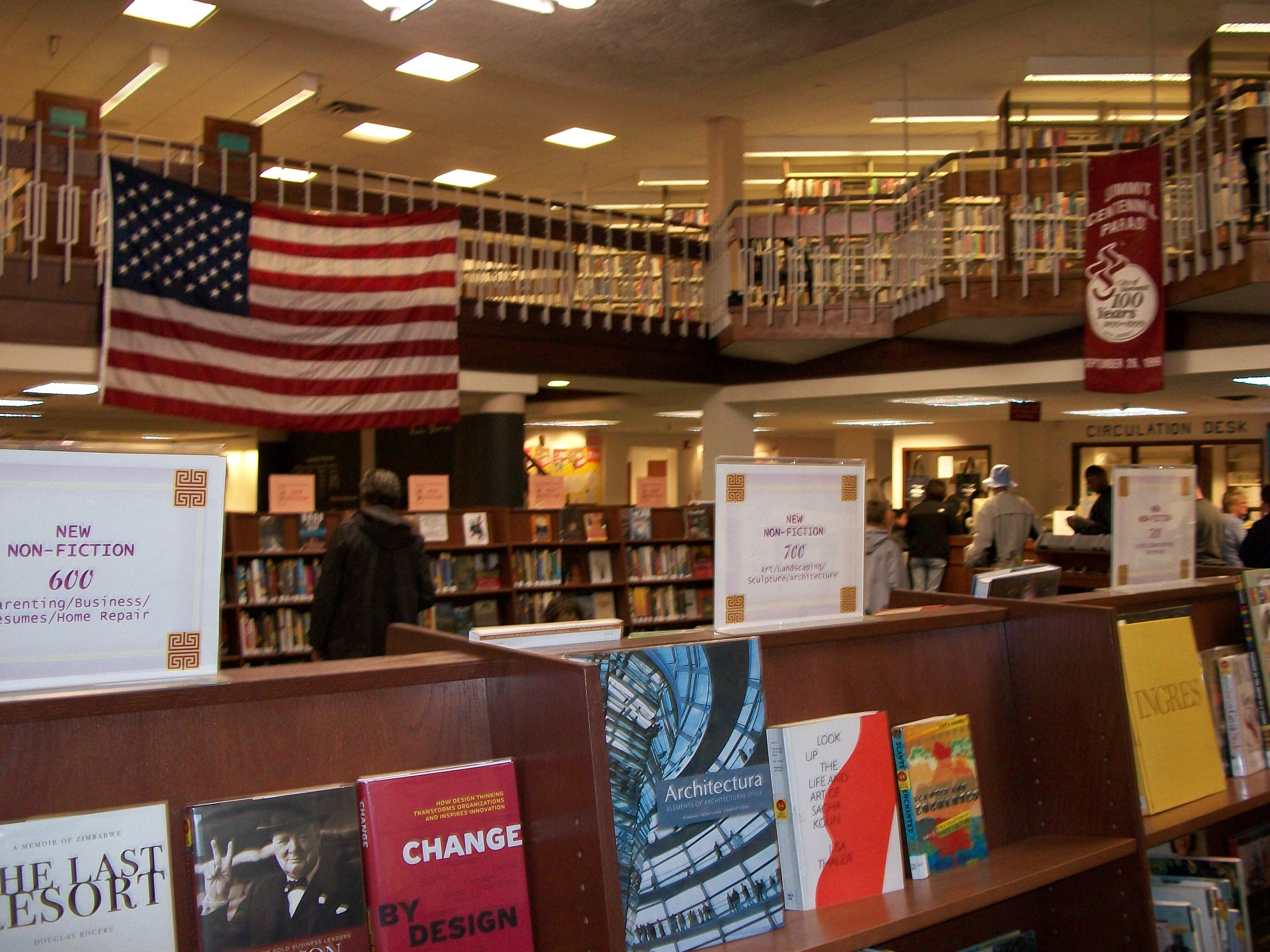
The public library in Summit, New Jersey

Libraries have been started with wills from other benefactors. For example, the Bacon Free Library in South Natick, Massachusetts, was founded in 1881 after a benefactor left $15,000 in a will; it has operated as a public library since then. Women's clubs in the late 1880s and early 1900s supported the creation of libraries in their communities.

Louisiana public libraries were developed with a grant from the American Library Association in 1925.

A "school district public library" is a type of public library with a service district overlapping a school district. Votes related to library governance and funding, as well as the collection of levied taxes, are administered by the school district.

=== Carnegie libraries ===
Andrew Carnegie, born to poverty, taught himself and became a leading industrialist and philanthropist. Among his many philanthropies was the public library—he built and furnished a library if the city agreed to maintain and staff it. He gave over $60 million, which was a vast fortune in 20th-century dollars. Carnegie envisioned that libraries would "bring books and information to all people."

A total of 2,509 Carnegie libraries were built between 1883 and 1929, including some belonging to universities; 1,689 were built in the United States, 660 in Britain and Ireland, 125 in Canada, and others in Australia, New Zealand, and elsewhere. By 1930, half the American public libraries had been built by Carnegie.

Carnegie was attached to free libraries since his days as a young messenger-boy in Pittsburgh, when each Saturday he borrowed a new book from one. Carnegie systematically funded 2,507 libraries throughout the English-speaking world. James Bertram, Carnegie's chief aide from 1894 to 1914, administered the library program, issued guidelines and instituted an architectural review process.

Between 1886 and 1917, Carnegie reformed both library philanthropy and library design, encouraging a closer correspondence between the two. The Carnegie buildings typically followed a standardized style called "Carnegie Classic": a rectangular, T-shaped or L-shaped structure of stone or brick, with rusticated stone foundations and low-pitched, hipped roofs, and space allocated by function and efficiency.

His libraries served not only as free circulating collections of books, magazines and newspapers, but also provided classrooms for growing school districts, Red Cross stations, and public meeting spaces, not to mention permanent jobs for the graduates of newly formed library schools. Academic libraries were built for 108 colleges. Usually there was no charge to read or borrow; in New Zealand, however, local taxes were too low to support libraries and most charged subscription fees to their users. The arrangements were always the same: Carnegie would provide the funds for the building but only after the municipal government had provided a site for the building and had passed an ordinance for the purchase of books and future maintenance of the library through taxation. This policy was in accord with Carnegie's philosophy that the dispensation of wealth for the benefit of society must never be in the form of free charity but rather must be as a buttress to the community's responsibility for its own welfare.

In 1901, Carnegie offered to donate $100,000 to the city of Richmond, Virginia, for a public library. The city council had to furnish a site for the building and guarantee that $10,000 in municipal funds would be budgeted for the library each year. Despite the support from the majority of Richmond's civic leaders, the city council rejected Carnegie's offer. A combination of aversion to new taxes, fear of modernization, and fear that Carnegie might require the city to admit black patrons to his library account for the local government's refusal. A Richmond Public Library did open in 1924 with alternative sources of funding. In a municipal election in 1904 union leaders in Wheeling, West Virginia, blocked the acceptance of a Carnegie library. The Detroit Library subsisted on library fines and inadequate city funds; Carnegie offered $750,000 in 1901 but was turned down because it was "tainted money"; after nine more years of underfunding Detroit took the money.

=== Changing roles of libraries ===
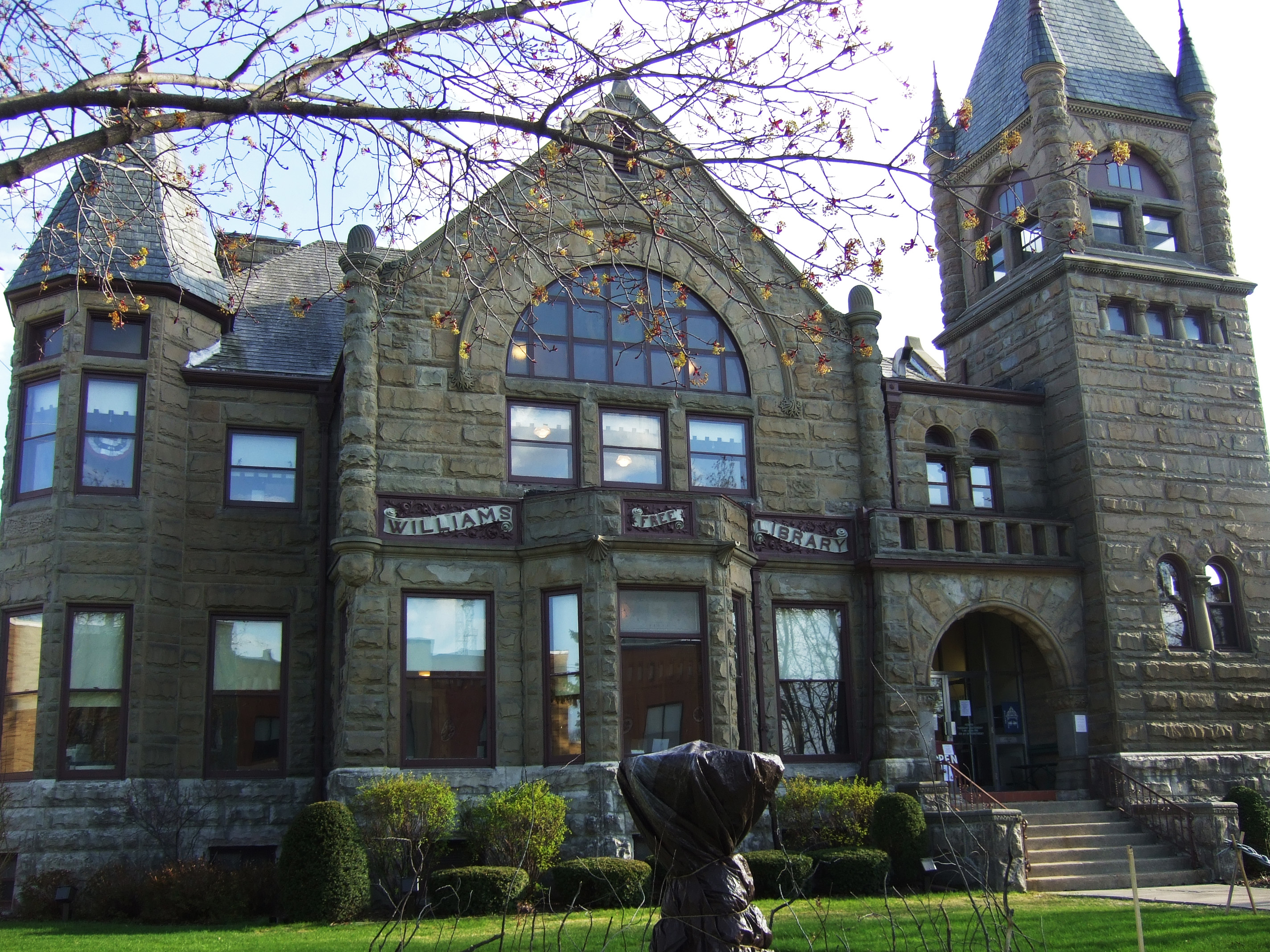
The former Williams Free Library in Beaver Dam, Wisconsin, features an architectural style called Richardsonian Romanesque.

In many towns and small cities before 1900, local boosters operated social libraries, which were open by subscription. The middle classes patronized them, borrowed bestsellers and old classics, and came to know the other book lovers in town. These libraries became the forerunners of the public library.

Butte, Montana, was perhaps the largest, richest and rowdiest mining camp in the American West. City boosters opened a public library in 1893. Ring argues that the library was originally a mechanism of social control, "an antidote to the miners' proclivity for drinking, whoring, and gambling." It was also designed to promote middle-class values and to convince Easterners that Butte was a cultivated city. Quite apart from the Wild West, civic boosters hailed the opening of a public library as a landmark in their upward march of civilization and civility.

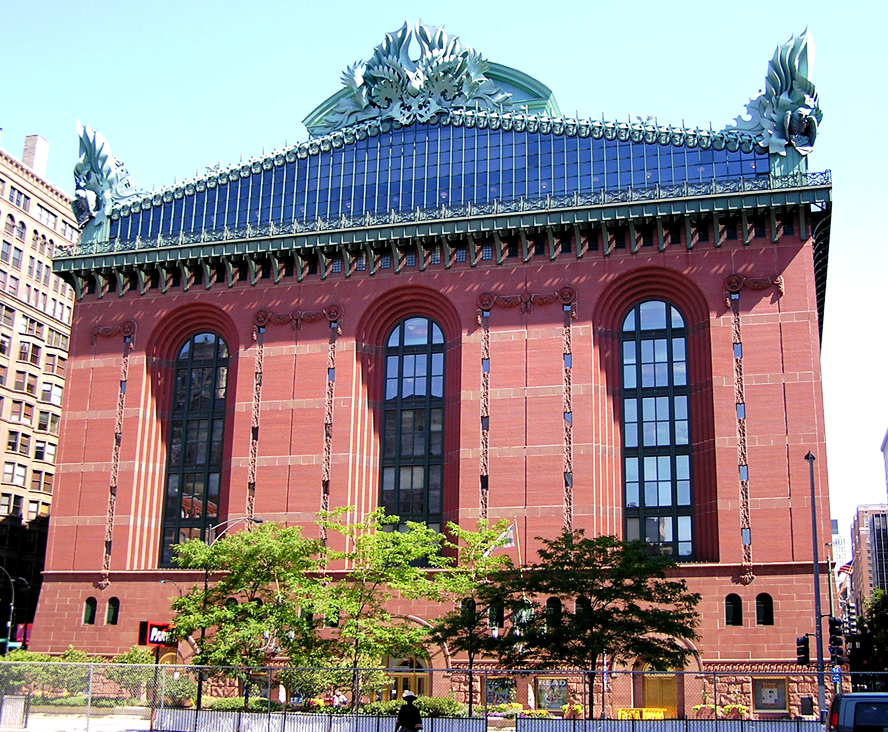
Chicago Public Library, 1991

As VanSlyck (1989) shows, the last years of the 19th century saw acceptance of the idea that libraries should be available to the American public free of charge. However the design of the idealized free library was at the center of a prolonged and heated debate. On one hand, wealthy philanthropists favored grandiose monuments that reinforced the paternalistic metaphor and enhanced civic pride. They wanted a grandiose showcase that created a grand vista through a double-height, alcoved bookhall with domestically-scaled reading rooms, perhaps dominated by the donor's portrait over the fireplace. Typical examples were the New York Public Library and the Chicago Public Library. Librarians considered that grand design inefficient, and too expensive to maintain. The Brumback Library in Van Wert, Ohio, claims to be the first county library in US.

Melvil Dewey instituted a traveling library system for upstate New York in 1892. The idea spread rapidly in the North. By 1898 there were over a hundred traveling libraries in Wisconsin alone, 534 in New York.

In the 2020s, amenities at some locations such as the Natrona County Public Library in Casper, Wyoming include a trade paperback section, a computer lab with printers and Internet access, DVDs, video games for video game consoles, and a 3D printing station complete with a 3D scanner.

=== National Planning for Public Libraries after World War II ===
In 1943 Librarian of Congress, Archibald MacLeish appointed Carleton B. Joeckel to chair a committee on Post-War Standards for Public Libraries. In 1944 Joeckel organized a Library Institute at the University of Chicago Graduate Library School. Papers prepared at this Institute addressed: (1) library service organization at the local level; (2) role of the state, and (3) state and federal aid to libraries. Joeckel with Amy Winslow developed the National Plan for Public Library Service which provided a framework for library development after World War II.

Once the idea of the public library as an agency worthy of taxation was broadly established during the 19th and early 20th centuries, librarians through actions of the American Library Association and its division devoted to public libraries, the Public Library Association, sought ways to identify standards and guidelines to ensure quality service.

In 1945 the American Library Association established an Office in Washington, DC to advocate for library legislation. Legislation including the Library Services Act (1956) and the Library Services and Construction Act (1964) ensured that unserved areas and unserved groups would have access to library services. The 1991 White House Conference on Library and Information Services (WHCLIS) was analyzed from a public policy view for the National Commission on Libraries and Information Science to identify the public's uses and needs for library and information services.

In 1996 the Library Services and Technology Act (LSTA) was enacted with an emphasis on technology infrastructure. The public library's role in supporting social equity has been reviewed by Lily Rose Kosmicki.

==== Public Library Service Responses ====
In 2007, the Public Library Association defined eighteen public library service responses. These service responses are not comprehensive, but rather demonstrated the kinds of services public libraries most commonly provide:

1. Be an Informed Citizen: Local, National, and World Affairs
2. Build Successful Enterprises: Business and Nonprofit Support
3. Celebrate Diversity: Cultural Awareness
4. Connect to the Online World: Public Internet Access
5. Create Young Readers: Early Literacy
6. Discover Your Roots: Genealogy and Local History
7. Express Creativity: Create and Share Content
8. Get Facts Fast: Ready Reference
9. Know Your Community: Community Resources and Services
10. Learn to Read and Write: Adults, Teens, and Family Literature
11. Make Career Choices: Job and Career Development
12. Make Informed Decisions: Health, Wealth, and Other Life Choices
13. Satisfy Curiosity: Lifelong Learning
14. Stimulate Imagination: Reading, Viewing, and Listening for Pleasure
15. Succeed in School: Homework Help
16. Understand How to Find, Evaluate, and Use Information: Information Fluency
17. Visit a Comfortable Place: Physical and Virtual Spaces
18. Welcome to the United States: Services for New Immigrants

==== Public Library Association Project Outcome ====
Project Outcome was launched in 2015 by the Public Library Association." It provides tools for public libraries to implement outcome measurement as a result of using library services and programs. The Project Outcome toolkit provides public libraries access to training, data analytics and surveys to measure outcomes in library service areas:

- Civic/Community Engagement
- Digital Learning
- Early Childhood Literacy
- Economic Development
- Education/Lifelong Learning
- Health
- Job Skills
- Summer Reading

=== Public library publications ===
- Public Libraries Magazine. The official journal of the Public Library Association.
- Public Libraries Online The online counterpart to Public Libraries magazine
- Public Library Quarterly. The Public Library Quarterly is "addressed to leaders-directors, managers, staff, trustees, and friends-who believe that change is imperative if public libraries are to fulfill their service missions in the twenty-first century."

== Canada ==
In 1779 Governor Frederick Haldimand founded the first subscription library in Québec City, Canada. Canada's small libraries were mostly held by rich families or religious institutions, and the general public was not admitted. "Haldimand's library, like other subscription libraries, appealed primarily to an urban elite", Haldimand's library later merged with the Literary and Historical Society of Quebec (established in 1824), which displays the original Québec Library collection within its library. This and similar association/social libraries were examples of early prototypes of public libraries. They were public in that membership was allowed regardless of class or religion, and many in Canada eventually evolved into free public libraries.

"Subsequently legislative collections were established in 1791 in Upper and in 1792 in Lower Canada; and in 1796 the first public library was founded in Montreal. In 1800, libraries were established in King's College, Nova Scotia, and at Niagara-on-the-Lake, where the first public library in Upper Canada operated for twenty years, in spite of losses during the War of 1812.".

In Saint John, New Brunswick, in 1883, following the efforts of Colonel James Domville in procuring a collection of materials to replace the many private collections lost in the Great Fire of Saint John, New Brunswick, the first free, tax-supported public library was established. Guelph, Ontario, and Toronto, Ontario, opened public libraries that same year as well. Due to Canada's size and diversity, the development of the modern Canadian public library was more of a slow evolution than a quick transition as each of the provinces' specific conditions (geographic, economic, cultural, demographic, etc.) had first to be addressed. The public library therefore took on many forms in Canada's earlier years; the three most prevalent of these forms were school-district libraries, Mechanics Institutes, and association/social libraries (see reference to Literary and Historical Society of Quebec above).

In 1850, school-district libraries were initiated in Canada. Public servant Joseph Howe started one in Nova Scotia, and politician Egerton Ryerson started one in Ontario. New Brunswick and Prince Edward Island followed suit in 1858 and 1877, respectively. The hope was that both children and adults could benefit from the local school authorities, where financial assistance was provided from colonial legislatures, but the departments of education proved to be too centralizing for locals and this practiced was phased out. Mechanics Institutes also contained libraries that the working class could access inexpensively. The first Canadian library of its kind was established in 1828 in Montréal, Québec. Other communities took up this idea as well – notably those in Halifax, Nova Scotia, Hamilton, Ontario, Toronto, Ontario and Victoria, British Columbia. Like the school-district libraries, these institutes eventually ceased or were replaced by public libraries.

The public library that opened in Toronto, Ontario, was mostly due to a campaign by city alderman John Hallam. James Bain became the first chief librarian, and built a comprehensive collection of Canadian literature and history. The Toronto Public Library was one of the first libraries to choose free status, and it was the largest of them all. Its development flourished after 1900 when Carnegie grants began to aid in building construction and the expansion of collections and services. During this time, open access and children's departments were introduced, and standard cataloguing and classification systems were adopted. Many of the original branches, funded by a Carnegie grant, still stand and continue to be operated by the Toronto Public Library. Other provinces were affected by Carnegie as well and followed Ontario's lead in legislating tax support for library services. British Columbia acted in 1891, Manitoba in 1899, Saskatchewan in 1906, and in Alberta, the first legislation officially passed by the legislative assembly was the Library Act. The act was passed March 15, 1907. The next provinces to follow were New Brunswick in 1929, Newfoundland in 1935, Prince Edward Island in 1936, Nova Scotia in 1937, Québec in 1959, and then the Northwest Territories in 1966.

Public libraries in Canada are "governed by provincial statutes and are primarily financed by municipal tax revenues and other local income, with provincial grants supplementing local funding. [They are also] the responsibility of a local or regional library board with authority to appoint or dismiss employees, control library property, establish policies, and budget for library operations." Though the services offered vary from local branch to local branch, public libraries in Canada are not only places to read and borrow books; they are also hubs of community services, such as early reading programs, computer access, and tutoring and literacy help for children and adults.

Throughout the years, Canadian libraries have been subject to the political and economic influence of the nation. During World War II, public libraries experienced development setbacks, but expansion resumed in 1945. However, there was a different situation in Quebec due to the influence of the Catholic Church. Then, in the 1960s, Canadian public libraries felt the benefits of the era's emphasis on education – service expanded, buildings were remodeled or constructed from scratch, and Centennial grants were provided in order to improve the system. This period of growth ended in due to the inflationary period in the 1970s and the two recessions during the 1980s. However, in the late 1990s this trend reversed and the National Core Library Statistics Program reported in 1999 that public libraries served 28.5 million municipal residents – a total of 93% of the Canadian population. Nevertheless, in 2011 the tides turned for public libraries in Canada once again, specifically in Toronto. The city is now undergoing a heated debate regarding Mayor Rob Ford's proposed budget cuts for the Toronto Public Library, which is currently one of the most efficient public library systems in all of North America.

A position statement, "Library & Literacy Services for Indigenous (First Nations, Métis & Inuit) Peoples of Canada" was issued by the Canadian Federation of Library Associations in 2016.

In 2023 the report, Overdue: The Case for Canada's Public Libraries, was released by The Canadian Urban Libraries Council / Conseil des Bibliothèques Urbaines du Canada. The report on the work of 652 library systems and 3350 branches makes the case that investment in public libraries will create social cohesion, contribute to economic growth, and support community resilience for the future.

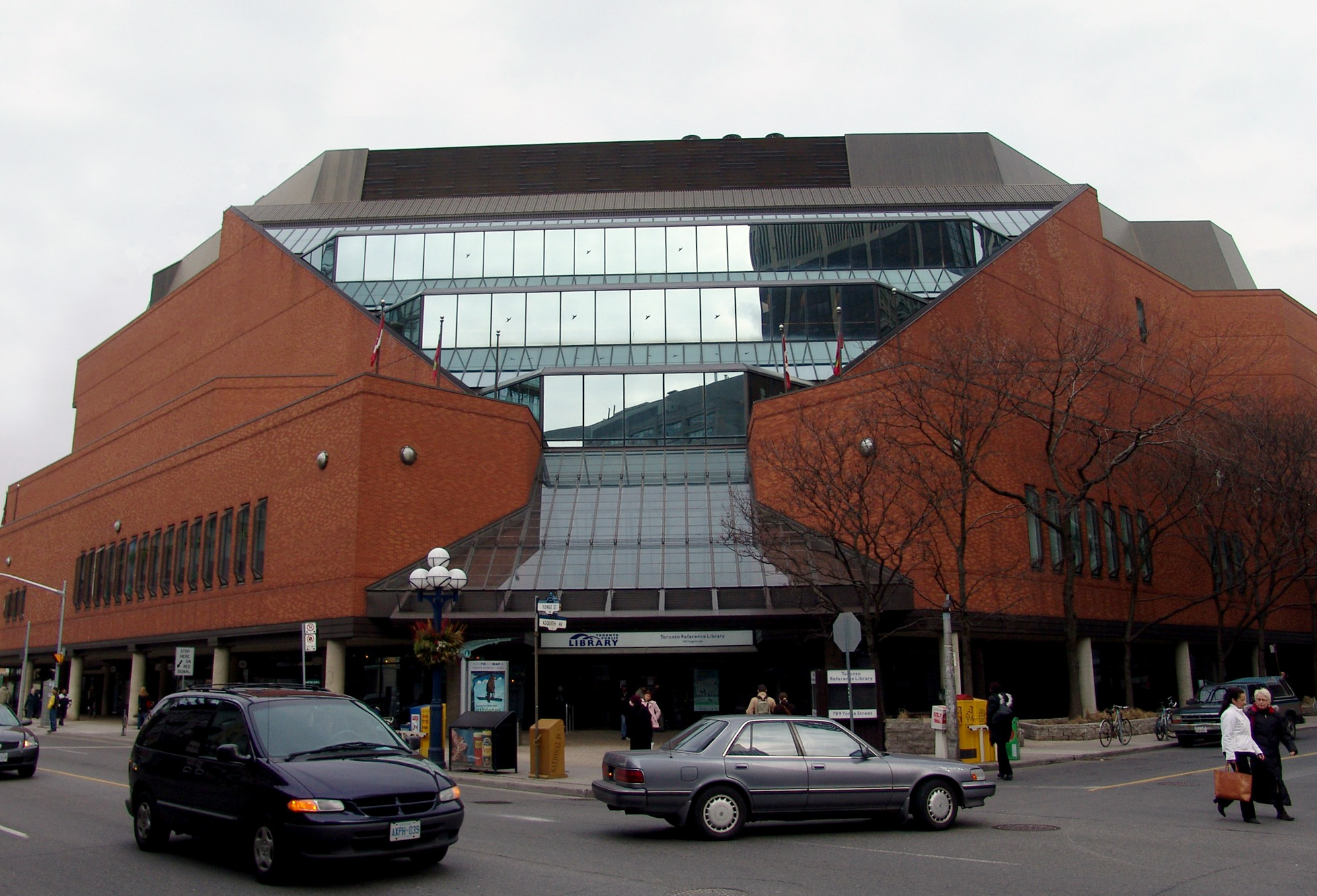
The Toronto Reference Library, centrepiece of the Toronto Public Library system

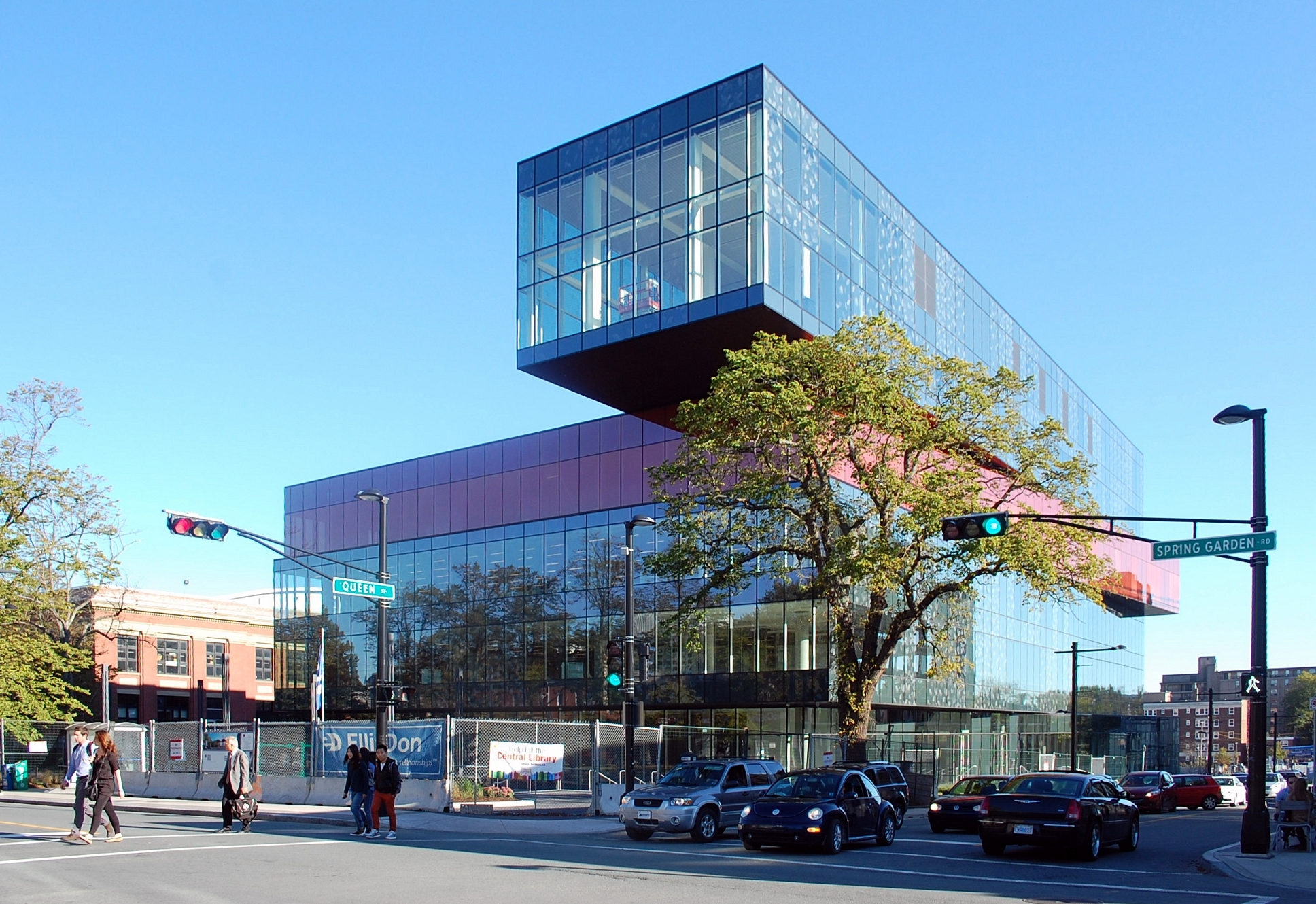
The new Halifax Central Library.

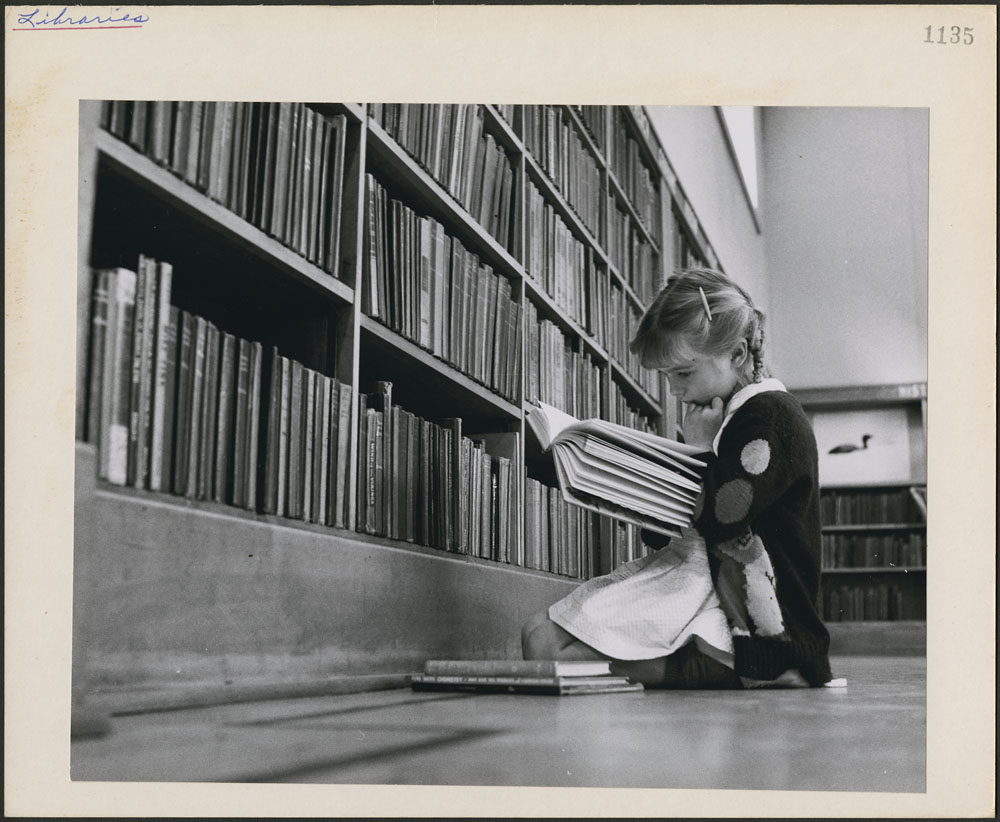
Young girl reading a book, Central Circulating Library at College and St. George Streets, Toronto, Ontario, c. 1930–1960.

== Mexico ==
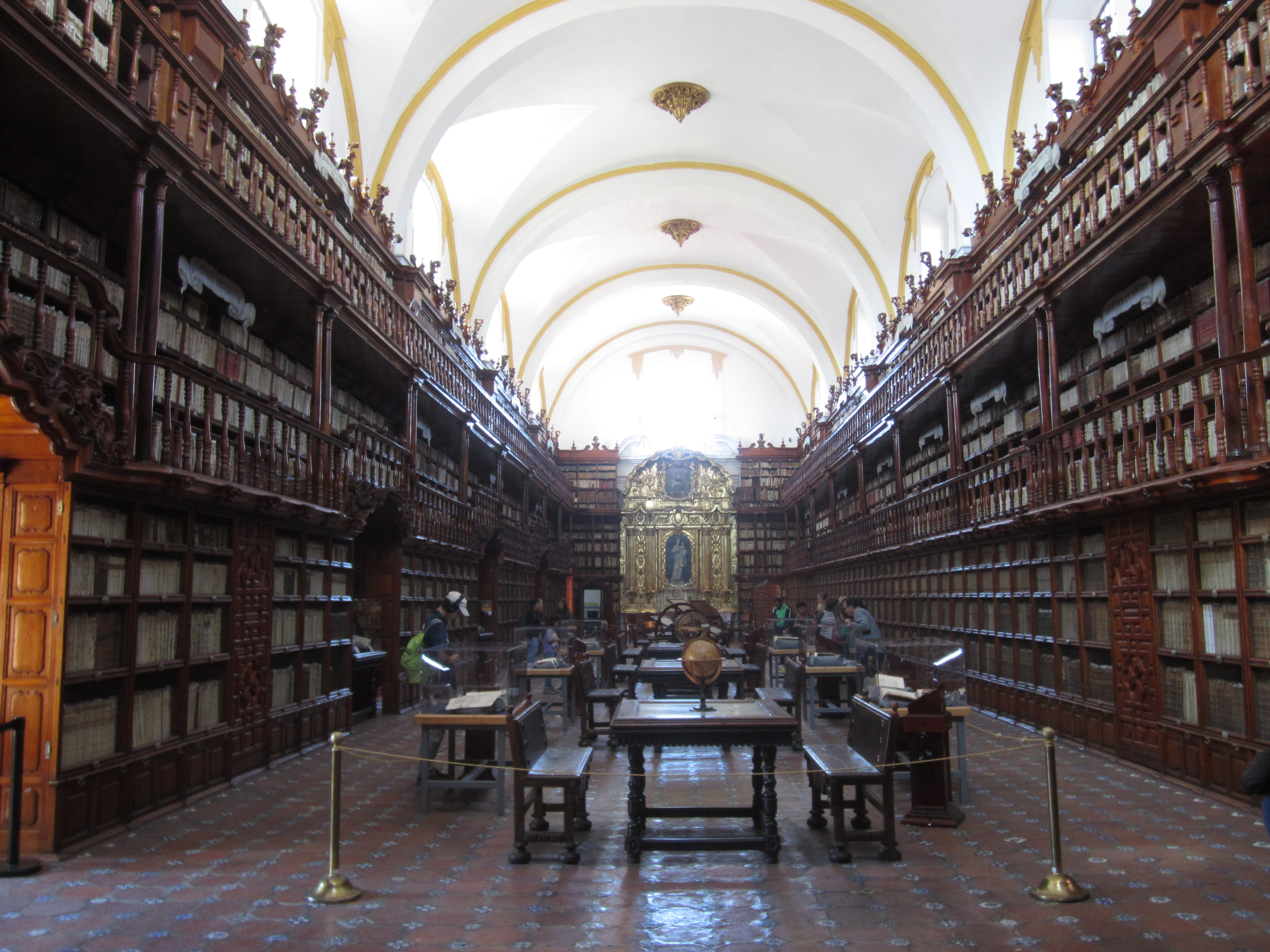
Biblioteca Palafoxiana

The Biblioteca Palafoxiana in Puebla, Mexico, is the oldest public library in the Western Hemisphere. In 1640, the Bishop of Puebla, Juan de Palafox y Mendoza, donated 5,000 books from his private collection to the seminary of the Colegio de San Juan with the condition that the books be available to anyone who could read, and not just academics, thus creating the first public library in North America. In 2005, UNESCO added it to the Memory of the World Programme list.

The Biblioteca Nacional de México on the main campus of the National Autonomous University of Mexico in Mexico City was established in 1833. As a national library it is the preeminent bibliographic repository of Mexico. It also attempts to acquire all foreign books published about Mexico. Its collection of 1,250,000 documents, including books, maps and recordings makes it one of the largest libraries in Mexico and Latin America.

== See also ==
- Public libraries for the rest of the world
