= Joseph Wharton Lippincott =

American publisher, naturalist, and sportsman

Joseph Wharton Lippincott (February 28, 1887 – October 22, 1976) was a noted publisher, author, naturalist, and sportsman. He was the grandson of Joshua Ballinger Lippincott, founder of Philadelphia publisher J.B. Lippincott Company, and of industrialist Joseph Wharton, founder of the Wharton School of Business of the University of Pennsylvania.

== Biography ==
Lippincott was born in Philadelphia, Pennsylvania, the son of Joshua Bertram Lippincott, one of the four children of publisher Joshua Ballinger Lippincott and Joanna Wharton, one of the three daughters of industrialist Joseph Wharton. He was educated at the Episcopal Academy and the Wharton School of the University of Pennsylvania, from which he graduated in 1908. Following college, he joined J. B. Lippincott & Co., the family publishing firm he would serve for fifty years, including as president from 1927 until 1948, and then as chairman of the board until his retirement in 1958. Throughout his life, Lippincott was an enthusiastic sportsman.

=== Books ===
Lippincott wrote seventeen books about animals and nature, including Wilderness Champion; The Wolf King; The Wahoo Bobcat; Long Horn, Leader of the Deer; Chiseltooth, the Beaver; Persimmon Jim, the Possum; Bun, a Wild Rabbit; Little Red, the Fox; Gray Squirrel; Striped Coat, the Skunk; The Red Roan Pony; Animal Neighbors of the Countryside; and Black Wings, the Unbeatable Crow.

=== Award for Outstanding Librarianship ===
In 1938 he founded the Joseph W. Lippincott Award for Outstanding Librarianship, which continues to be awarded by the American Library Association each year. Recipients of the Award have included Mary Utopia Rothrock, Robert B. Downs, Essae Martha Culver, Carleton B. Joeckel, Lester Asheim, E.J. Josey, Patricia G. Schuman, Robert Wedgeworth, Peggy Sullivan, Henry T. Drennan, John N. Berry, John Y. Cole, Betty J. Turock, Carla Hayden, Camila Alire, Maurice J. Freedman, and Julius C. Jefferson Jr.

== Family ==
He married Elizabeth Schuyler Mills in 1913, and the couple had two sons, Joseph Wharton Lippincott, Jr. and R. Schuyler Lippincott, and a daughter, Elizabeth (Betsy) Schuyler (Lippincott) Wilkes. His wife died in 1943 and he remarried Virginia (Jones) Mathieson in 1945.

== Bibliography ==
=== Fiction ===
- Bun: a Wild Rabbit (1918)
- Red Ben the Fox of Oak Ridge (1919)
- Gray Squirrel (1921)
- Striped Coat, the Skunk (1922) illustrated with photographs
- Persimmon Jim the 'Possum (1924)
- Long Horn, Leader of the Deer (1928) illustrated with photographs
- The Wolf King (1933) illustrated by Paul Bransom
- The Red Roan Pony (1934) illustrated by Lynn Bogue Hunt
- Chisel-Tooth the Beaver (1936) illustrated by Roland V. Shutts
- Wilderness Champion (1944) illustrated by Paul Bransom
- Black Wings: The Unbeatable Crow (1947) illustrated by Lynn Bogue Hunt
- The Wahoo Bobcat (1950) illustrated by Paul Bransom
- The Phantom Deer (1954) illustrated by Paul Bransom
- Old Bill, the Whooping Crane (1958) illustrated with photographs
- Coyote, the Wonder Wolf (1964) illustrated by Ed Dodd

==== American Wildlife Series ====
All the books in this series of revised reissues were illustrated by George F. Mason. The original editions, published between 1918 and 1928, had been illustrated with photographs.

- Bun, a Wild Rabbit (revised edition, 1953)
- Little Red the Fox (revised edition of Red Ben, the Fox of Oak Ridge, 1953)
- Gray Squirrel (revised edition, 1954)
- Striped Coat, the Skunk (revised edition, 1954)
- Persimmon Jim, the Possum (revised edition, 1955)
- Long Horn, Leader of the Deer (revised edition, 1955)

=== Non-Fiction ===
- Naturecraft Creatures: The Art of Woodland and Sea Beach Modelling (1933, with G.J. Roberts)
- Animal Neighbors of the Countryside (1938) illustrated by Lynn Bogue Hunt
