= New York: Old & New =

Work by Rufus Rockwell Wilson

- The book's title page
- Author: Rufus Rockwell Wilson
- Language: English
- Genre: History
- Publisher: J. B. Lippincott Company
- Publication date: 1902 (124 years ago)
- Publication place: United States
- Media type: Hardback book
- Pages: 402 (volume I); 390 (volume II)

New York Old & New, subtitled Its Story, Streets, and Landmarks, is a two-volume book by Rufus Rockwell Wilson, published in October 1902 by J. B. Lippincott Company. According to The Delineator, in the book Rockwell "tells the story of New York City by its landmarks and streets in an authoritative and comprehensive manner." The first volume is 402 pages; the second is 390.

While the book has many illustrations taken from prints and photographs, its "decorations" are the work of Edward Stratton Holloway (1859–1939).

Wilson dedicated the book to William Winter and also acknowledged New York and its Historians, a series of articles by Mariana Griswold Van Rensselaer (1851–1934), for their "helpful suggestiveness".

== Contents ==
=== Volume I ===
- Section one: New Amsterdam and its Burghers
- Section two: The Sway of the English
- Section three: New York as a Free City

=== Volume II ===
- Section one: Through the Old City
- Section two: The Common to Love Lane
- Section three: Bloomingdale and Beyond

== Reception ==
According to the New York Tribune, the book was "well written and full of interesting matter."

In 1904, Boston Public Library added it the book to its Annual List of New and Important Books collection.
