= The Wahoo Bobcat =

American children's book

- First edition
- Author: Joseph Wharton Lippincott
- Illustrator: Paul Bransom
- Language: English
- Genre: Children's literature
- Publisher: J. B. Lippincott & Co., Philadelphia, Pennsylvania
- Publication date: 1950
- Publication place: United States
- Media type: Print

The Wahoo Bobcat is a children's book written by publisher and naturalist Joseph Wharton Lippincott and illustrated by Paul Bransom, and first published by J. B. Lippincott & Co. in 1950. Lippincott wrote 17 books about animals and nature. He wrote two books set in Florida, one of which was The Wahoo Bobcat.

== Plot ==
The Wahoo bobcat is the largest bobcat in the Florida water prairie wilderness. A nine-year-old boy and the bobcat establish a friendship that endures through seasons of drought, dangers such as wildfire, floods, panthers and more. However, an overarching threat throughout the book is the hunting of the cat by men and dogs in the Florida swamp.

== Reception ==
In a 1950 book review, Kirkus Reviews called the book "An appealing, authentic and unusual story of life in the Florida water prairie wilderness... Very little has been done with the life and habits of the bobcat, and the author's picture of the sleek, tough creature together with glimpses of the strange, violent life of the wilderness, makes an exciting and vivid book." The Quarterly Review of Biology wrote, "In telling his story of the bobcat's friendship with a backwoods boy, Joseph W. Lippincott gives an excellent portrayal of the swamp lands, their wildlife inhabitants, and the forces of nature which come into play to make the lives of the animals and the existence of man precarious and tenuous indeed."

== Adaptation ==
In October 1963, roughly 3½ years after securing film and TV rights to the book, Walt Disney's Wonderful World of Color broadcast its dramatized version.
