= Juliustown, New Jersey =

School district in Burlington County, New Jersey, US

- Census-designated place
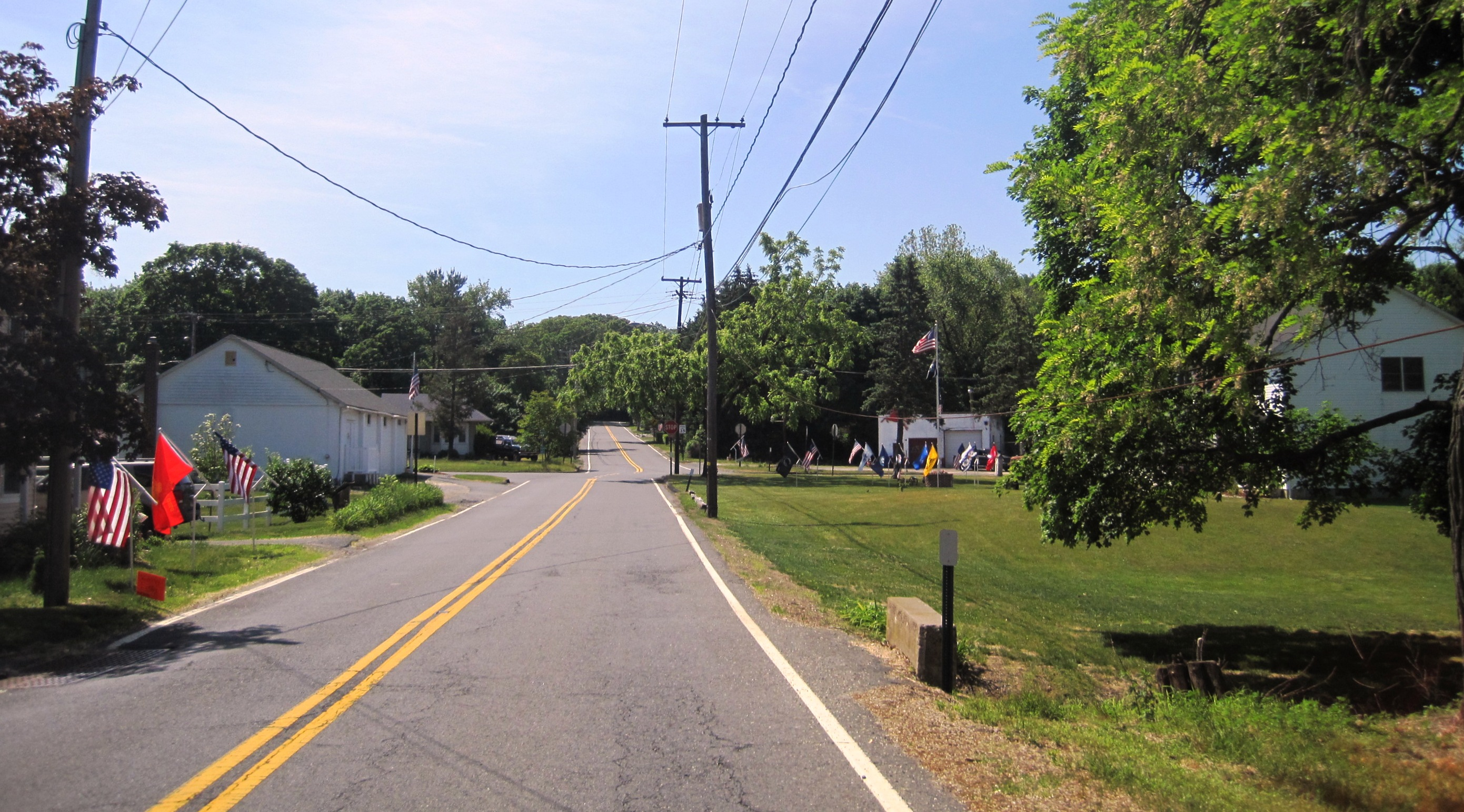
- Georgetown-Juliustown Road approaching Main Street in Juliustown

- Location in Burlington County Location in New Jersey Location in the United States
- Coordinates: 40.01181°N 74.67116°W
- Country: United States
- State: New Jersey
- County: Burlington
- Township: Springfield

Area
  - Total: 1.19 sq mi (3.08 km^{2})
  - Land: 1.19 sq mi (3.08 km^{2})
  - Water: 0 sq mi (0.00 km^{2}) 0.00%
- Elevation: 118 ft (36 m)

Population (2020)
  - Total: 362
  - Density: 304.0/sq mi (117.38/km^{2})
- Time zone: UTC−05:00 (Eastern (EST))
  - Summer (DST): UTC−04:00 (Eastern (EDT))
- ZIP Code: 08042
- Area codes: 609, 640
- FIPS code: 3436300
- GNIS feature ID: 02633184

Juliustown is an unincorporated community and census-designated place (CDP) located within Springfield Township, in Burlington County, in the U.S. state of New Jersey, that was established as part of the 2010 United States census. As of the 2020 census, Juliustown had a population of 362.

== Geography ==
According to the United States Census Bureau, the CDP had a total area of 1.284 square miles (3.327 km^{2}), all of which was land.

== Demographics ==
Historical population
Census	Pop.	Note	%±
2010	429		—
2020	362		−15.6%
Population source: 2010 2020

Juliustown first appeared as a census designated place in the 2010 U.S. census formed from part of the Fort Dix CDP and additional area.

=== 2020 census ===
Juliustown CDP, Alabama – Racial and ethnic composition Note: the US Census treats Hispanic/Latino as an ethnic category. This table excludes Latinos from the racial categories and assigns them to a separate category. Hispanics/Latinos may be of any race.
Race / Ethnicity (NH = Non-Hispanic)	Pop 2010	Pop 2020	% 2010	% 2020
White alone (NH)	400	329	93.24%	90.88%
Black or African American alone (NH)	12	4	2.80%	1.10%
Native American or Alaska Native alone (NH)	0	0	0.00%	0.00%
Asian alone (NH)	6	2	1.40%	0.55%
Native Hawaiian or Pacific Islander alone (NH)	0	0	0.00%	0.00%
Other race alone (NH)	0	0	0.00%	0.00%
Mixed race or Multiracial (NH)	6	14	1.40%	3.87%
Hispanic or Latino (any race)	5	13	1.17%	3.59%
Total	429	362	100.00%	100.00%

=== 2010 census ===
The 2010 United States census counted 429 people, 142 households, and 125 families in the CDP. The population density was 334.0 per square mile (129.0/km^{2}). There were 150 housing units at an average density of 116.8 per square mile (45.1/km^{2}). The racial makeup was 93.71% (402) White, 2.80% (12) Black or African American, 0.00% (0) Native American, 1.40% (6) Asian, 0.00% (0) Pacific Islander, 0.00% (0) from other races, and 2.10% (9) from two or more races. Hispanic or Latino of any race were 1.17% (5) of the population.

Of the 142 households, 34.5% had children under the age of 18; 71.8% were married couples living together; 11.3% had a female householder with no husband present and 12.0% were non-families. Of all households, 7.7% were made up of individuals and 2.8% had someone living alone who was 65 years of age or older. The average household size was 3.02 and the average family size was 3.14.

23.8% of the population were under the age of 18, 10.0% from 18 to 24, 24.0% from 25 to 44, 31.2% from 45 to 64, and 11.0% who were 65 years of age or older. The median age was 40.1 years. For every 100 females, the population had 101.4 males. For every 100 females ages 18 and older there were 112.3 males.

== Education ==
Its school districts are Springfield Township School District (elementary) and Northern Burlington Regional School District (secondary school).

== Notable people ==
People who were born in, residents of, or otherwise closely associated with Juliustown include:

- Phil Haines (born 1950), Superior Court judge and former member of the New Jersey General Assembly.
- Joshua Ballinger Lippincott (1813-1886), publisher and founder of J.B. Lippincott & Co. publishing house
- Walter Livingston Wright (1872–1946), professor of mathematics and president of Lincoln University.
