= Rambles in Colonial By-Ways =

Work by Rufus Rockwell Wilson

- Author: Rufus Rockwell Wilson
- Language: English
- Genre: History
- Publisher: J. B. Lippincott Company
- Publication date: 1901 (125 years ago)
- Publication place: United States

Rambles in Colonial By-Ways is a book by Rufus Rockwell Wilson, published in fifteen chapters over two volumes in 1901 by J. B. Lippincott Company. It includes photogravures and half-tones from drawings and photographs by William Lincoln Hudson. It was described as being "rich in memories of the past" and "treat[ing] colonial matters upon an entirely novel plan." William Hilton, in the Boston Home Journal, described the book as being "one of the most pleasant travel-books of the period."

Some of the chapters are based on passages which appeared in Lippincott's, Harper's Weekly, The New England Magazine and Churchman but were substantially rewritten.

== Chapters ==
=== Volume I ===
- Two Atlantic Islands
- Some Colonial Nooks
- Rambles in Old New York
- In the Wake of the Patroons
- The Albany Post Road
- The Land of the Six Nations
- The West Bank of the Hudson

=== Volume II ===
- Along the Eastern Shore
- The City of the Friends
- Penn's Manor and Beyond
- God's Peculiar People
- Bethlehem and Around There
- Three Groups of German Mystics
- Through Washington's Country
- Yorktown and Her Neighbors
