= Library Services and Construction Act =

U.S. legislation passed in 1964

- Long title: An Act to amend the Library Services Act in order to increase the amount of assistance under such Act and to extend such assistance to nonrural areas.
- Acronyms (colloquial): LSCA
- Nicknames: Library Services Act Amendment of 1964
- Enacted by: the 88th United States Congress
- Effective: February 11, 1964

Citations
- Public law: 88-269
- Statutes at Large: 78 Stat. 11

Codification
- Titles amended: 20 U.S.C.: Education
- U.S.C. sections amended: 20 U.S.C. ch. 16 § 351 et seq.

Legislative history
- Introduced in the Senate as S. 2265 by John Herman Dent (D–PA) on October 29, 1963; Committee consideration by Senate Labor and Public Welfare, House Education and Labor; Passed the Senate on November 26, 1963 (89-7); Passed the House on January 21, 1964 (260-113) with amendment; Senate agreed to House amendment on January 29, 1964 (Agreed); Signed into law by President Lyndon B. Johnson on February 11, 1964

The Library Services and Construction Act, enacted in 1964 by the U.S. Congress, provides federal assistance to libraries in the United States for the purpose of improving or implementing library services or undertaking construction projects.

The 88th U.S. Congress passed the S. 2265 bill which the 36th President of the United States Lyndon B. Johnson enacted into law on February 11, 1964.

== History ==
Since public libraries depended on local taxes, sometimes there would be a struggle for funding, especially in rural areas. After the Great Depression in 1929 and the creation of the Works Progress Administration in 1935, part of Franklin D. Roosevelt's New Deal, the American Library Association (ALA) realized federal funding was the best solution. Carleton Joeckel headed the committee on Post-War Standards for Public Libraries in 1943. In 1948 Joeckel and Amy Winslow wrote A National Plan for Public Library Service published by the American Library Association.

In 1956, the ALA was finally able to persuade Congress to pass the Library Services Act, which provided funds for public library initiatives but did not extend to buildings or land.

== Aim ==
Influenced by the civil rights movement of the 1960s, a primary aim of the Library Services and Construction Act was to provide funding for underserved and/or disadvantaged communities in need of library service. Some of these groups include but are not limited to the institutionalized, the physically handicapped, low-income families, senior citizens, and ethnic minorities.

== Reauthorizations ==
In its thirty-year history, the Library Services and Construction Act has undergone numerous reauthorizations. Each amendment has been dictated by changing needs in the library community, and these needs have been identified and voiced by state librarians and public library directors alike. Some of these amendments include appropriations for literacy programs and the acquisition of foreign-language materials. While changes to the Library Services and Construction Act have sought to keep this piece of legislation current, through the years many have voiced opposition to certain aspects of this act.

== Modifications ==
Federally funded, many programs for the purpose of educational and social development have more traditionally been a fiscal responsibility of each individual state. Though with shrinking state budgets, a shift to a state-funded program for library services and construction seemed somewhat unfeasible. Additionally, a re-examination of which library services should be preserved and which should be abandoned has been suggested. Perhaps as a result of this opposition, in 1995 the LSCA was replaced by the Library Services and Technology Act (LSTA), dropping construction from the federal funding available.

== Funded programs ==
Its change of title in 1995 notwithstanding, numerous library programs and services have been initiated by funds through the Library Services and Construction Act, and continue to depend on those funds for their existence. An example of one program funded through the LSCA is Project PLUS (Promoting Larger Units of Service). This program uses federal funding so that library systems can demonstrate the services of a library to a group of unserved residents, so that they may experience what services and resources would be available to them if a referendum was passed in their community and a library was established. While programs such as Project PLUS have provided success stories from the funds provided by the LSCA, discussion will undoubtedly continue as to the legitimacy and necessity of federal funds for libraries throughout the country.

== See also ==
- List of libraries in the United States
- Public libraries in the United States
- Henry T. Drennan
