= Henry T. Drennan =

Henry T. Drennan (1913–2003) was an American librarian, state library administrator, and federal official. He supported goals of the War on Poverty.

== Early life and education ==
Drennan was born in Portland, Oregon. He graduated from Jefferson High School and held early jobs such as elevator operator, waiter, and safety assistant during Bonneville Dam construction.

He served as a staff sergeant in the U.S. Army Air Corps during World War II.

After the war he earned two bachelor's degrees—one in political science from Seattle University and one in library science from the University of Washington.

== Career ==
Drennan served as head librarian for Hood River County and Pendleton County public libraries in Oregon, then as assistant director of a Ford Foundation project surveying Pacific Northwest library resources.

He was State Librarian of Idaho from 1959 to 1961 where the 1956 federal Library Services Act (LSA). Idaho qualified for grants after the state legislature increased its budget in 1957, funding bookmobiles and other outreach. During this period Drennan wrote Public Library Development in Idaho: a Working Paper contributing to planning amid federal funding growth.

In 1962, Drennan moved to Washington, D.C., joining the U.S. Office of Education (then part of the United States Department of Health, Education, and Welfare—HEW). He spent 20 years in the library division (later Office of Libraries and Learning Resources / Bureau of Libraries and Technology), initially helping administer the Library Services and Construction Act (LSCA) and later working in research and development.

He edited the 1964 Library Journal special issue on the “War on Poverty,” highlighting federal programs, local library outreach to the disadvantaged, and providing case studies.

Drennan coordinated the long-running OE public library statistics program (biennial/annual since the 1940s, with population-stratified breakdowns) and produced targeted manpower studies. These reports provided institutional, operational, staffing, financial, and demographic data on thousands of libraries, enabling trend analysis, funding justification, and service planning for underserved groups.

Drennan retired from federal service in 1982, moved to Craftsbury, Vermont, worked briefly as a newspaper stringer, then served as head librarian of the Morristown Centennial Library from 1984 to 1994, retiring at age 79.

== Death ==
Drennan died in Craftsbury on August 26, 2003.

== Awards and honors ==
The American Library Association (ALA) recognized Drennan's contributions in 1978 with the Joseph W. Lippincott Award as the outstanding U.S. librarian of the year, citing his Idaho service and federal work. The award citation noted: "His vision and clear sense of priorities were vital as the government moved to fund library programs in the '60s, and his wise and steadfast insistence that federal funds serve the poor as well as the literate elite resulted in a subtle but crucial change in both the nature and the extent of federal support for library services."

== Selected publications ==
- Drennan, H. T.; Wenberg, L.B. (1959). "Public library and the schools". ALA Bulletin. 53: 132–133.
- Drennan, Henry T. (1961). Public Library Development in Idaho, a Working Paper: Summarized Recommendations with Time Lines. Idaho State Library. Boise, Idaho: Idaho State Library.
- Drennan, Henry T., ed. (1964-09-15). "War on Poverty" (PDF). Library Journal. 89: 3241–3275.
- Public Library Association (1967). Hiatt, Peter; Drennan, Henry T. (eds.). Public Library Services for the Functionally Illiterate: a Survey of Practice. Chicago.
- Drennan, Henry T. (1967). "Federal Funds for Facilities". ALA Bulletin. 61 (9): 1054–57. JSTOR 25697724.
- Frantz, John C. (1970s). "Federal Legislation and Public Library Development". In Drennan, Henry T. (ed.). Federal Library Legislation. et al. Washington, DC: U.S. Office of Education. pp. 153–160.
- Drennan, H. T. (1981). "Libraries and literacy education". Catholic Library World. 52: 376–385.
