= Library Services and Technology Act =

U.S. legislation passed in 1996

- Other short titles: Museum and Library Services Act; Museum and Library Services Act of 1996
- Long title: An Act to provide for library services and technology under Museum and Library Services Act, with an emphasis on library services and technology, access, and literacy programs for underserved communities.
- Acronyms (colloquial): LSTA
- Nicknames: Omnibus Consolidated Appropriations Act, 1997
- Enacted by: the 104th United States Congress
- Effective: September 30, 1996

Citations
- Public law: 104-208
- Statutes at Large: 110 Stat. 3009 aka 110 Stat. 3009-295

Codification
- Titles amended: 20 U.S.C.: Education
- U.S.C. sections created: 20 U.S.C. ch. 72, subch. II § 9121 et seq.

Legislative history
- Introduced in the House as H.R. 3610 by Bill Young (R–FL) on June 11, 1996; Committee consideration by House Appropriations, Senate Appropriations; Passed the House on September 28, 1996 (Passed without objection, in lieu H.R. 4278); Passed the Senate on September 30, 1996 (84-15 Roll call vote 302, via Senate.gov, in lieu of H.R. 4278); Reported by the joint conference committee on September 28, 1996; agreed to by the House on September 28, 1996 (370-37 Roll call vote 455, via Clerk.House.gov) and by the Senate on September 30, 1996 (Passed voice vote); Signed into law by President Bill Clinton on September 30, 1996

United States president Bill Clinton signed the Library Services and Technology Act (LSTA) on October 1, 1996. LSTA is a United States federal library grant program. Its roots come from the Library Services Act, first enacted in 1956. LSTA replaced the Library Services and Construction Act (LSCA), first enacted in 1962. The National Commission on Libraries and Information Science held two White House Conferences that generated discussion and support.

The American Library Association and other library groups developed the new act.

Many changes occurred with the passage of LSTA. The original act, LSCA, allocated funds for building construction, but LSTA emphasizes technology. The new priority is the creation of technological infrastructure. Another change that occurred with the passage of LSCA was the responsibility of library services. This responsibility was originally a part of the Department of Education. It was moved to the newly created, independent federal agency: the Institute of Museum and Library Services (IMLS). The range of libraries served also changed with the enactment of LSTA. Initially, public libraries were primarily served by LSCA. With the passage of LSTA, all types of libraries are served, including public, school, academic, and special.

Not all initiatives under LSCA have changed with the enactment of LSTA. Priorities, like services to the underserved and rural areas, are still supported.

LSCA is a federally funded state-based program, generally administered by the state library of each state. Each state sets specific funding categories based on a long-range plan filed with the IMLS

== State Libraries LSTA Resources and Five-Year Plans ==
- Alaska State Library - LSTA Landing Page
  - AK 2013-2017 Plan
- Alabama State Library - LSTA Landing Page
  - AL 2013-2017 Plan
- Arkansas State Library - LSTA Landing Page
  - AR 2013-2017 Plan
- Arizona State Library - LSTA Landing Page
  - AZ 2013-2017 Plan
- California LSTA Landing Page
  - CA 2013-2017 Plan
- Colorado LSTA Landing Page
  - CO 2013-2017 Plan
- Connecticut State Library - LSTA Landing Page
  - CT 2013-2017 Plan
- Delaware State Library - LSTA Landing Page
  - DE 2013-2017 Plan
- District of Columbia - LSTA Landing Page
  - DC 2013-2017 Plan
- State Library of Florida - LSTA Landing Page
  - FL 2018-22 Plan
- Georgia State Library - LSTA Landing Page
  - GA 2013-2017 Plan
- Hawaii State Library - LSTA Landing Page
  - HI 2013-2017 Plan
- Iowa State Library - LSTA Landing Page
  - IA 2013-2017 Plan
- Idaho State Library - LSTA Landing Page
  - ID 2013-2017 Plan
- Illinois State Library - LSTA Landing Page
  - IL 2013-2017 Plan
- Indiana State Library - LSTA Landing Page
  - IN 2013-2017 Plan
- Kansas State Library - LSTA Landing Page
  - KS 2013-2017 Plan
- Kentucky State Library - LSTA Landing Page
  - KY 2013-2017 Plan
- Louisiana State Library - LSTA Landing Page
  - LA 2013-2017 Plan
- Massachusetts State Library - LSTA Landing Page
  - MA 2013-2017 Plan
- Maryland State Library - LSTA Landing Page
  - MD 2015 Handout
- Maine State Library - LSTA Landing Page
  - ME 2013-2017 Plan
- Michigan State Library - LSTA Landing Page
  - MI 2018 Report
  - MI 2013-2017 Plan
- Minnesota State Library - LSTA Landing Page
  - MN 2013-2017 Plan
- Missouri State Library - LSTA Landing Page (cached version)
  - MO 2013-2017 Plan (cached version)
- Mississippi State Library - LSTA Landing Page
  - MS 2013-2017 Plan
- Montana State Library - LSTA Landing Page
  - MT 2013-2017 Plan
- Nebraska State Library - LSTA Landing Page
  - NE 2013-2017 Plan
- Nevada State Library - LSTA Landing Page
  - NV 2013-2017 Plan
- New Hampshire State Library - LSTA Landing Page
  - NH 2023-2027 Plan
- New Jersey State Library - LSTA Landing Page
  - NJ 2013-2017 Plan
- New Mexico State Library - LSTA Landing Page
  - NM 2013-2017 Plan
- New York State Library - LSTA Landing Page
  - NY 2012-2017 Plan
- North Carolina State Library - LSTA Landing Page
  - NC 2013-2017 Plan
- North Dakota State Library - LSTA Landing Page
  - ND 2012-2018 Plan
- Ohio (State Library of Ohio) - LSTA Landing Page
  - OH 2013-2017 Plan
- Oklahoma State Library - LSTA Landing Page
  - OK 2013-2017 Plan
- Oregon State Library - LSTA Landing Page
  - OR 2013-2017 Plan
  - OR 2018-2022 Plan
  - OR 2023-2027 Plan
- Pennsylvania State Library - LSTA Landing Page
  - PA 2013-2017 Plan
- Rhode Island State Library - LSTA Landing Page
  - RI 2013-2017 Plan
- South Carolina State Library - LSTA Landing Page
  - SC 2013-2017 Plan
- South Dakota State Library - LSTA Landing Page
  - SD 2013-2017 Plan
- Tennessee State Library - LSTA Landing Page
  - TN 2013-2017 Plan
- Texas State Library - LSTA Landing Page
  - TX 2013-2017 Plan
- Utah State Library - LSTA Landing Page
  - UT 2013-2017 Plan
- Virginia State Library - LSTA Landing Page
  - VA 2013-2017 Plan
- Vermont State Library - LSTA Landing Page
  - VT 2013-2017 Plan
- Washington State Library - LSTA Landing Page
  - WA 2012-2017 Plan
- Wisconsin State Library - LSTA Landing Page
  - WI 2013-2017 Plan
- West Virginia State Library
  - WV 2013-2017 Plan
- Wyoming State Library - LSTA Landing Page
  - WY 2013-2017 Plan

== See also ==
- List of libraries in the United States

== Sources ==
- American Library Association, Fight to Defend Federal Funding for Libraries
