= Edward Stratton Holloway =

American artist

- Born: August 21, 1859; Ashland, New York, U.S.
- Died: November 3, 1939 (aged 80); Philadelphia County, Pennsylvania, U.S.
- Resting place: Westminster Cemetery, Bala Cynwyd, Pennsylvania, U.S.

Edward Stratton Holloway (August 21, 1859 – November 3, 1939) was an American artist. He was artistic director of J. B. Lippincott & Co. for 46 years and authored and co-wrote several books.

== Early life ==
Holloway was born in 1859 in Ashland, New York, to Reverend Charles Hoover Holloway and Rebecca Pauline (or Pawling) Stratton. He was the eldest of their four children; he was followed by Augusta, Mary and Grace. (Another source states there were five children.) He studied at the Pennsylvania Academy of the Fine Arts. He exhibited his work there from 1881 to 1905.

== Career ==
For 46 years, from 1891, Holloway was the art director for J. B. Lippincott & Co. He also published several books on interior design and furnishings. These included The Practical Book of Interior Decoration and American Furniture and Decoration: Colonial and Federal.

Holloway's work was exhibited at the National Academy of Design (1888), Art Institute of Chicago (1897, 1904) and the 1904 St. Louis Exposition, where he won the bronze medal.

== Personal life ==
Holloway married Clara Augusta Githins in 1884, with whom he had one child, son Alfred, in 1885. In 1909, the family was living at 250 South 13th Street in Philadelphia.

Stratton's father died from pneumonia in 1923, aged 91.

== Death ==
Holloway died in 1939, aged 80. He was interred in Westminster Cemetery in Bala Cynwyd, Pennsylvania. His widow, who survived him by nine years, was buried in Forest Hills Memorial Park in Reiffton, Pennsylvania. Their son, who died seven months after his mother, was also interred in Forest Hills.
