= John Lippincott House =

Historic house in Iowa, United States

- U.S. National Register of Historic Places
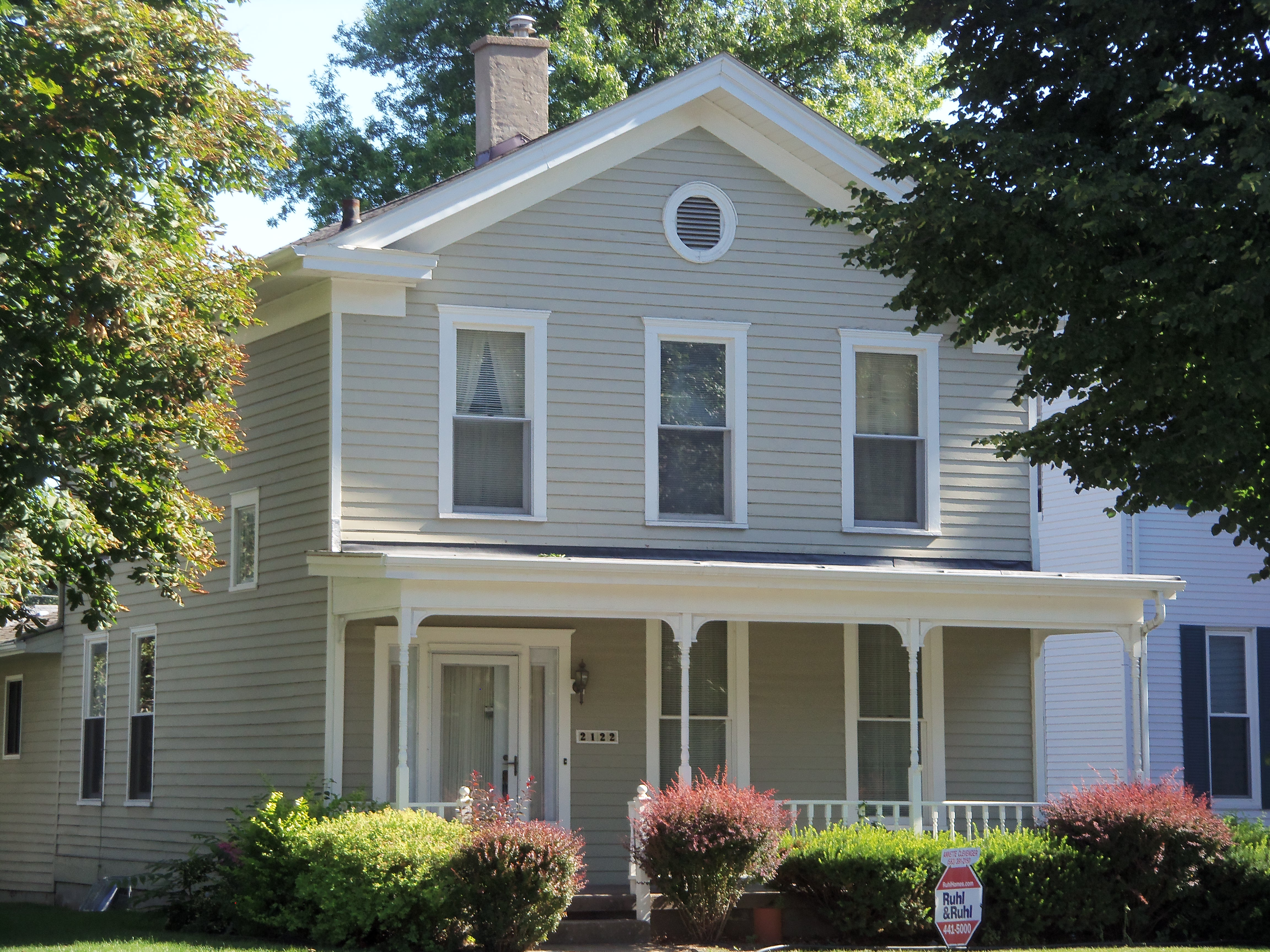

- Location within Iowa Location within the United States
- Location: 2122 W. 3rd St. Davenport, Iowa
- Coordinates: 41°31′21″N 90°36′36″W
- Area: less than one acre
- Built: 1870
- Architectural style: Greek Revival
- MPS: Davenport MRA
- NRHP reference No.: 83004527
- Added to NRHP: July 7, 1983

The John Lippincott House is a historic building located in the West End of Davenport, Iowa, United States. It has been listed on the National Register of Historic Places since 1983.

== History ==
John Lippincott built this after the conclusion of the American Civil War. He did not list an occupation for himself instead he said he was a capitalist.

== Architecture ==
The house is an example of a popular form found in the city of Davenport: two-story, three–bay front gable, with an entrance off center and a small attic window below the roof peak. This house has the suggestion of a classical pediment, which is accomplished by bringing the roof eaves and cornice partway across the front. A small columned porch with a pediment completes the front. Another architectural element to the house is a bay window that is featured toward the back on the east side of the house.
