= Lippincott Mansion =

Historic house in Florida, United States

- U.S. National Register of Historic Places
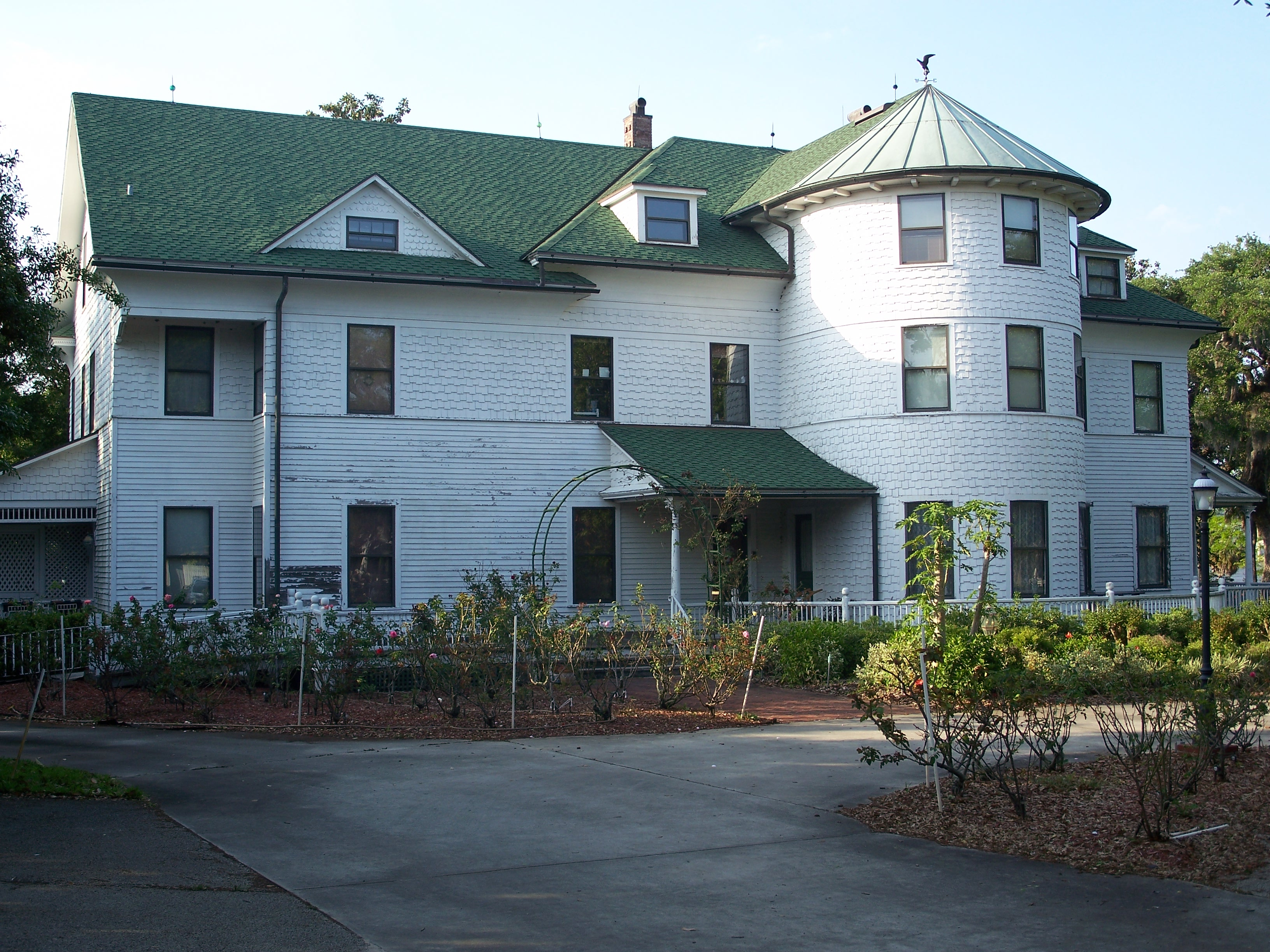

- Location within Volusia County
- Location: Ormond Beach, Florida
- Coordinates: 29°16′51″N 81°3′15″W
- Architectural style: Late Victorian
- NRHP reference No.: 85000304
- Added to NRHP: February 21, 1985

The Lippincott Mansion (also known as the Melrose Hall) is a historic site in Ormond Beach, Florida, United States. On February 21, 1985, it was added to the U.S. National Register of Historic Places.
