= A.J. Holman and Company building =

- A.J. Holman and Company
- U.S. National Register of Historic Places
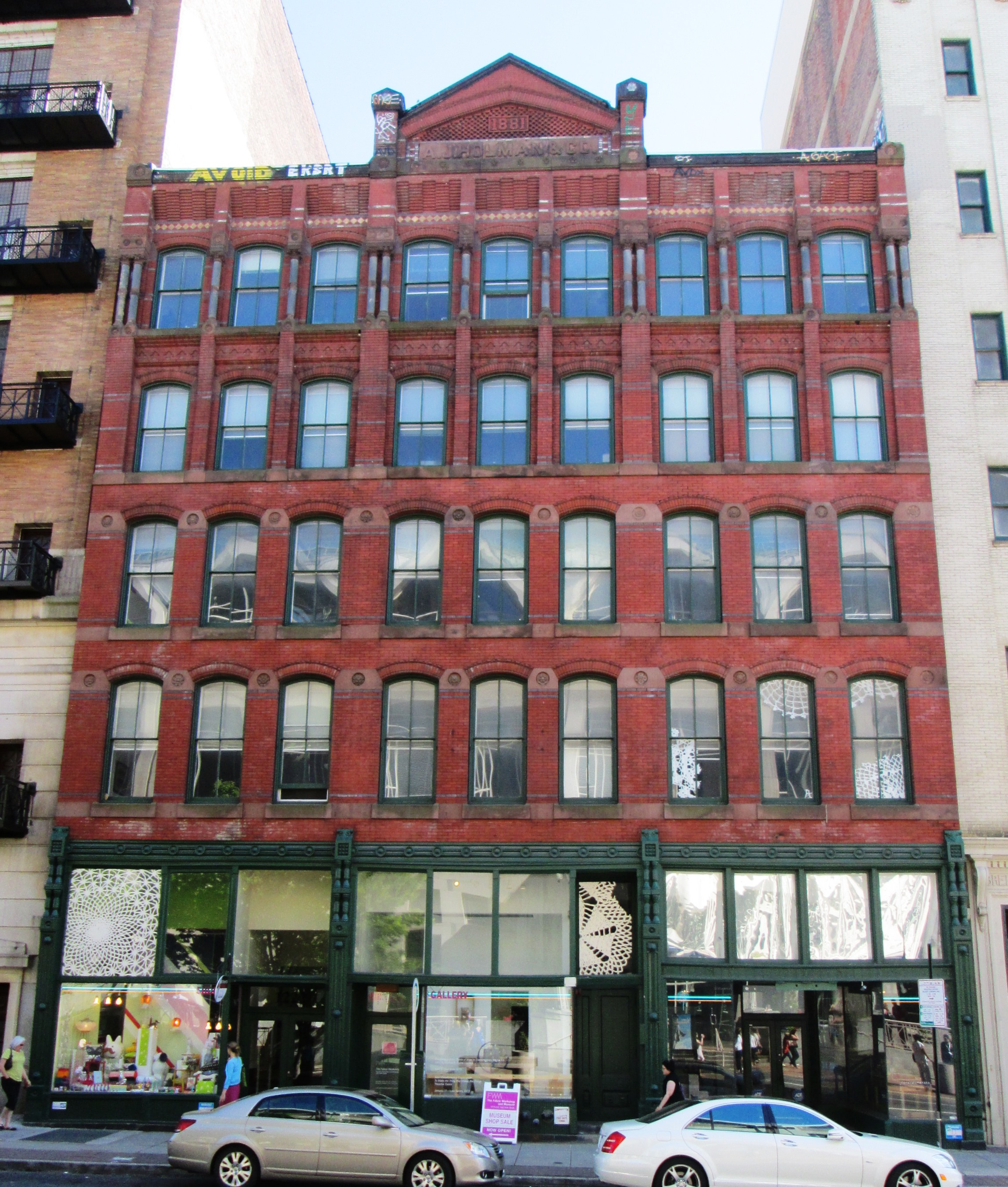
- (2013)

- Location within Philadelphia Location within Pennsylvania Location within the United States
- Location: 1224 Arch Street, Philadelphia, Pennsylvania, U.S.
- Coordinates: 39°57′13″N 75°9′38″W
- Area: 0.3 acres (0.12 ha)
- Built: 1881
- Architect: Wilson Brothers
- NRHP reference No.: 84003544
- Added to NRHP: May 17, 1984

The A.J. Holman and Company at 1224 Arch Street between N. 12th and N. 13th Streets in the Center City area of Philadelphia was built in 1881 and was designed by the Wilson Brothers, who also designed the nearby Reading Terminal. Andrew J. Holman founded the Bible-publishing business in 1872 and had this building constructed when their original space became too small for the growing company.

The front façade of the five-story, red brick building features cast iron piers on the first floor and a triangular pediment with Gothic arch at the roofline. It is one of the few commercial loft buildings from the period in Philadelphia which have not been extensively changed.

The building was added to the National Register of Historic Places in 1984.
