= Joshua Ballinger Lippincott =

American publisher (1813-1886)

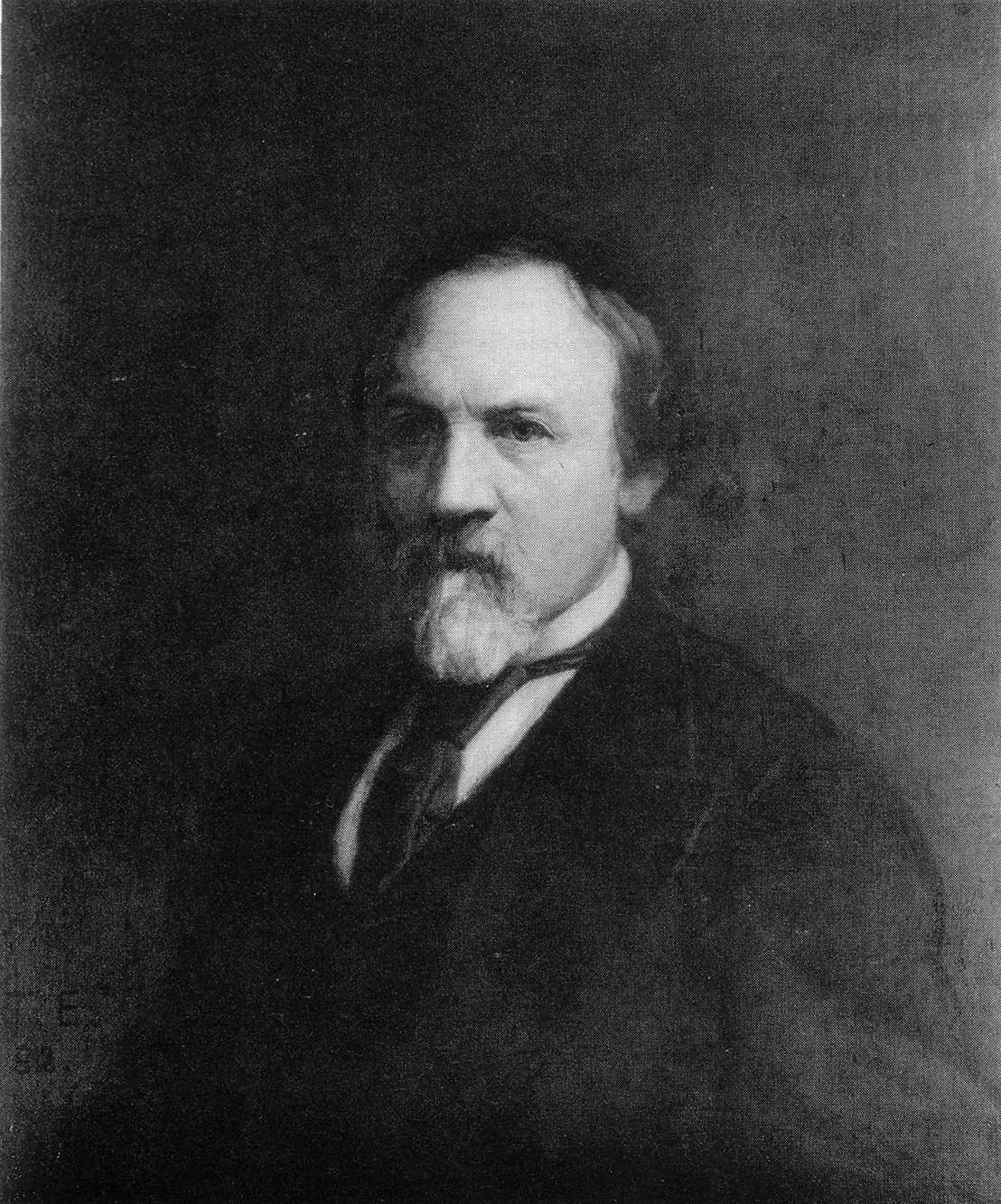
- A portrait of Lippincott by Thomas Eakins
- Born: March 18, 1813; Juliustown, New Jersey, U.S.
- Died: January 5, 1886 (aged 72); Philadelphia, Pennsylvania, U.S.
- Burial place: Laurel Hill Cemetery, Philadelphia, Pennsylvania, U.S.
- Occupation: Publisher

Joshua Ballinger Lippincott (March 18, 1813 – January 5, 1886) was an American publisher who founded the J. B. Lippincott & Co. publishing house in 1836.

== Early life ==
Lippincott was born in March 18, 1813, in Juliustown, New Jersey, the only child of Jacob Lippincott (1782–1834) and Sarah Ballinger (1789–1873).

By the time Lippincott was fourteen, his family had moved to Philadelphia, where he began selling books.

== Career ==
In 1836, Lippincott established J. B. Lippincott & Co., a publishing house. He purchased Grigg, Elliott & Co. in 1849, and reorganized as Lippincott, Grambo & Co. Grimbo retired in 1855, at which point the company reverted to its original name.

A fire in 1899 destroyed Lippincott headquarters, causing around $3 million in damage, but the company returned to its previous success level by the middle of the 20th century.

== Personal life ==
In 1845, Lippincott married Josephine C. Craige, daughter of Seth Craige, a noted cotton manufacturer in Philadelphia, with whom he had four children: sons Craige, Walter and Joshua Bertram, and daughter Josephine. Craige committed suicide in 1911.

Lippincott's grandson, Joseph Wharton Lippincott, became a president of the company, as did Joseph's son, Joseph Jr.

Former professional NFL quarterback Josh Rosen is named for Lippincott. His full name is Joshua Ballinger Lippincott Rosen.

== Death ==
Sensing the end of his life was approaching, in 1885 Lippincott passed ownership of the business to his sons. It became J. B. Lippincott Co.

Lippincott died in 1886, aged 72. He was interred in Laurel Hill Cemetery in Philadelphia. His widow survived him by thirteen years and was buried beside him.
