= Joseph Wharton Lippincott Jr. =

American publisher

Joseph Wharton Lippincott Jr., (1914–2003) was Chairman and President of Philadelphia publisher J. B. Lippincott Company.

He was born in Bethayres, Pennsylvania, the son of Joseph Wharton Lippincott and Elizabeth Schuyler Mills Lippincott. He was a descendant of Joshua Ballinger Lippincott, founder of J. B. Lippincott Company, and a great-grandson of Joseph Wharton, founder of the Wharton School of Business of the University of Pennsylvania.

== Education ==
Lippincott went to the Meadowbrook School and then to St. Paul's School before attending Princeton University.

== Career ==
In 1937 he joined the family firm he would serve for 41 years. He served in the American Field Service during World War II and returned to the Company in 1945. During his years as president, Lippincott oversaw the rapid expansion of the company in the 1950s and 1960s, the transformation of Lippincott into a public company in 1972, and its eventual acquisition by Harper & Row (now called “HarperCollins”) in 1978.

== Innovations ==
Many of J. B. Lippincott Company's well-known elementary and high school educational products were launched during his presidency, including Basic Keys to Spelling, Lippincott's Basic Reading, and Beginning to Read, Write and Listen. Mr. Lippincott was also responsible for expanding the company’s business outside of the United States, and made frequent trips to Europe and across the Pacific to Japan, South Korea, and the Philippines.

== Support for libraries ==
Lippincott was an active supporter of libraries, serving on the boards of Trustees of the Free Library of Philadelphia and of the Ludington Library in Bryn Mawr, now in the Lower Merion Library System. He was also on the Boards of the Urban Libraries Council, the Council of the American Library Association, the Council for Florida Libraries, the Friends of the Princeton Library, and the American Library Trustees Association. He was Chair of National Library Week.

He regularly attended the annual meeting of the American Library Association (ALA) to present the Joseph W. Lippincott Award for Outstanding Achievement in Librarianship, which was named for and founded by his father in 1938. It is one of the oldest and most prestigious awards given by the American Library Association.

== Family ==
Lippincott married Marie Louise Beck in 1950. Together they had a son, Joseph W. Lippincott III, who was President of Lippincott Williams & Wilkins, 1998–2000. Mr. Lippincott also had a daughter from a previous marriage, Elizabeth L. Mather.

Lippincott died in Bryn Mawr, Pennsylvania.
