= Rufus Rockwell Wilson =

American writer (1865–1949)

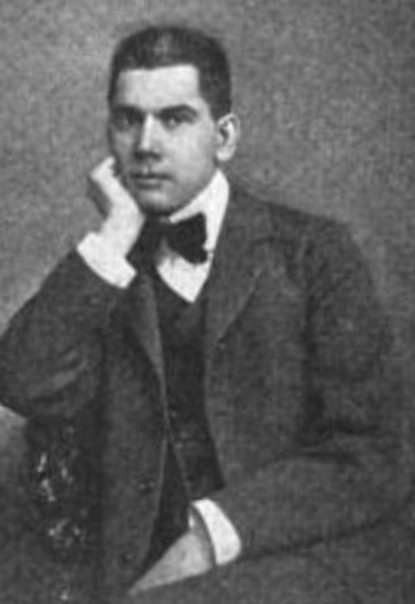
- Pictured around 1900
- Born: March 15, 1865; Troy, Pennsylvania, U.S.
- Died: December 14, 1949 (aged 84); Elmira, New York, U.S.
- Occupation: Writer
- Spouse(s): Harriette Louise Strong (1908–1948; her death); Anna Otilie Erickson (–1949; his death)

Rufus Rockwell Wilson (March 15, 1865 – December 14, 1949) was an American journalist and author. He was associate editor for the Elmira Telegram and ran the Primavera Press.

== Early life ==
Wilson was born in Troy, Pennsylvania, in 1865 to Hiram Wilson and Mary R. Rockwell. He was the youngest of their four known children, following Florence, Mary and another Rufus Rockwell, who died in his first year and was buried in Oak Hill Cemetery in Lansing, Iowa.

== Career ==
Between 1883 and 1891, Wilson worked as a journalist in Pittsburgh, Washington State and New York. In 1891, he began contributing to magazines. He was on the staff of the Brooklyn Eagle between 1906 and 1908, at which point he moved to Washington State to become editor and publisher of the Malden Herald.

== Publications ==
Below is a selection of Wilson's publications:

- Rambles in Colonial By-Ways (1901)
- Washington: The Capital City (1901)
- Historic Long Island (1902)
- New York: Old & New (1902)
- Lincoln in Caricature (1903)
- The Sea Rovers (1906)
- Uncollected Works of Abraham Lincoln (1947)

In the March 16, 1890, edition of the Elmira Telegram, Wilson wrote a "sketch of the life of America's most noted agnostic", lawyer Robert G. Ingersoll, who died the previous year.

== Personal life ==
Wilson was married twice; firstly to Harriette Louise Strong, in 1908, with whom he had two known children: son Edward and daughter Marion. Marion died in her first year. Harriette died in 1948. His second wife was Anna Otilie Erickson.

Wilson received a letter from Theodore Roosevelt in 1917.

In 1914, Wilson was living in Seattle, Washington. In 1927, he was living at 54 West 40th Street in Manhattan. Three years later, he was living in Oneida, Kentucky.

In 1943, he received an honorary doctorate from Lincoln Memorial University.

== Death ==
Wilson died in 1949, aged 84, at his home on West Church Street in Elmira, New York. He was interred in Glenwood Cemetery in Troy, alongside his infant daughter. Wilson's widow survived him by 34 years, and she was buried beside him upon her death in 1983, aged 93 or 94.
