= Paul Bransom =

American painter

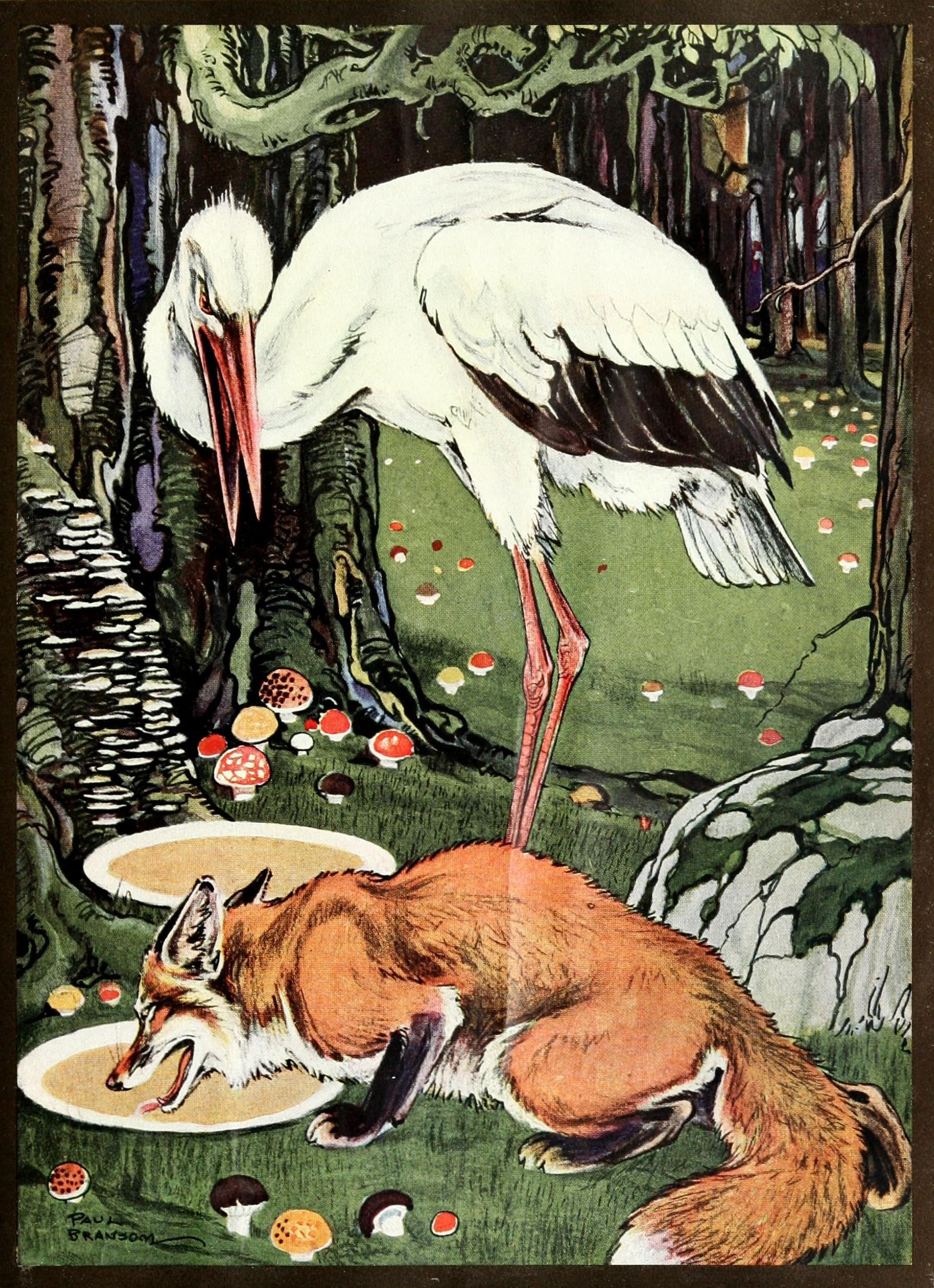
Illustration by Paul Bransom from An Argosy of Fables, plate facing p. 52

Paul Bransom (July 26, 1885 – July 19, 1979) was an American painter, cartoonist, and illustrator of animals.

== Biography ==
Born in Washington, D.C., as a child Bransom started sketching animals he saw in his backyard and at the National Zoo. He began his career as a technical draftsman for the U.S. Patent Office when he was 13 years old. He relocated to New York City in 1903 and began drawing comic strips for the New York Evening Journal there. He drew the comic strip The Latest News from Bugville (1903–1912). After moving to New York, his talent as a wildlife artist was recognized while creating studies of the animals at the Bronx Zoo. His earliest commissions were covers for the Saturday Evening Post and illustrations for editions of Kipling's Just So Stories and Grahame's The Wind in the Willows.

Bransom was awarded the Benjamin West Clinedinst Memorial Medal, and his works are included in the collection of the National Museum of American Illustration at Newport, Rhode Island.

Bransom was a resident of New York City from 1906 until his death. He died on July 19, 1979, during a visit to Quakertown, Pennsylvania, several days before his 94th birthday.

== Selected works ==
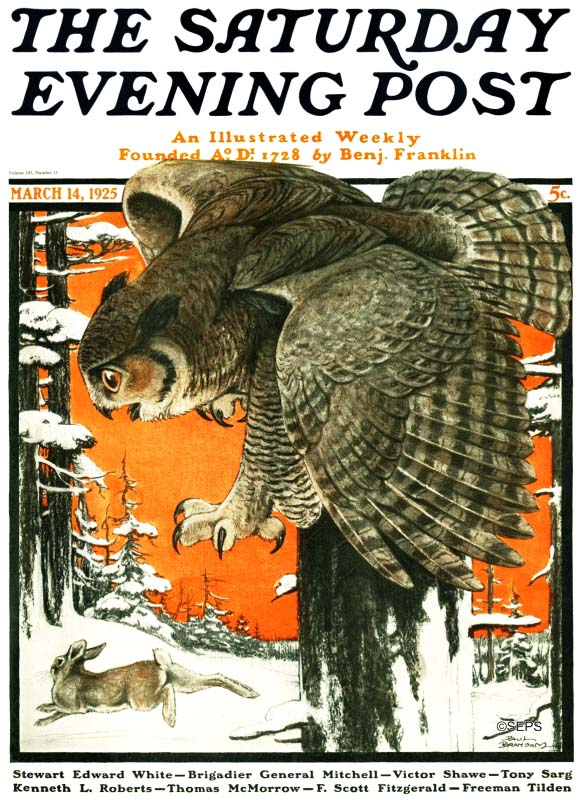
Saturday Evening Post cover (March 14, 1925)

- The Wind in the Willows, by Kenneth Grahame (C. Scribner's Sons, 1913)
- An Argosy of Fables, ed. Frederic Taber Cooper (Frederick A. Stokes, c1921)
- The Wild Heart, Emma-Lindsay Squier (Cosmopolitan Book Corp., 1922)
- Just So Stories, Rudyard Kipling, illustrated by Kipling and Joseph M. Gleeson (Garden City, NY: Country Life Press, c1912) – Bransom provided front cover, endpapers, and title page illustrations for a 1932 edition containing the Kipling and Gleeson interior illustrations
- The Country Gentleman (Curtis Publishing) cover illustration
