= Library Services Act =

U.S. legislation passed in 1956

- Long title: An Act to promote the further development of public library service in rural areas.
- Acronyms (colloquial): LSA
- Enacted by: the 84th United States Congress
- Effective: June 19, 1956

Citations
- Public law: 84-597
- Statutes at Large: 70 Stat. 293

Legislative history
- Introduced in the House as H.R. 2280 by Lister Hill (D–AL) on May 8, 1956; Passed the House on May 8, 1956; Passed the Senate on June 6, 1956; Signed into law by President Dwight D. Eisenhower on June 19, 1956

The Library Services Act (LSA) was passed by the U.S. Congress in 1956. Its purpose was to promote the development of public libraries in rural areas through federal funding. It was passed by the 84th United States Congress as the H.R. 2840 bill, which the 34th president of the United States Dwight D. Eisenhower signed into law on June 19, 1956.

== Background ==
Until passage of the Library Services Act public libraries depended on local taxes. In 1935, as part of Franklin D. Roosevelt's New Deal, the American Library Association recognized that federal funding was a solution to expand services. Carleton Joeckel headed a committee on Post-War Standards for Public Libraries in 1943. Joeckel's study, The Government of the American Public Library, provided the framework for the work of this committee.

In the fifty-year history of the American Library Association's Washington Office, Molumby has identified the Federal Relations Committee of the American Library Association, chaired by Paul Howard, as critical in providing support for ALA to have a representative in Washington, D.C. Paul Howard was the first director of the ALA Washington Office.

Discussion of the need for national library legislation increased during and after World War II. In 1948 Joeckel and Amy Winslow wrote A National Plan for Public Library Service published by the American Library Association. Julia Wright Merrill, Secretary of the Public Library Extension Committee of the American Library Association, was instrumental in the legislative process.

In 1983 Edward G. Holley and R.F. Schremser produced a historical overview that includes discussion of major participants in the legislation.

== Impact of the Library Services Act ==
To receive funding under the Library Services Act, state library administrative agencies were required to submit a plan to the Commissioner of Education that demonstrated how the funds would be used, whether for library personnel, books, or equipment. Thus, making state and local governments prioritize the improvement of their libraries while also establishing their own initiatives and objectives. Since federal government was not favorably looked upon at the time, the law stated multiple times the state’s authority regarding any decisions toward the library’s goals, management, or collection.

However, up until 1961, Indiana was the only state that did not accept federal funds. Governor Harold Handley believed that by accepting the funds, “Hoosiers would be brainwashed with books handpicked by the Washington bureaucrats.” U.S. Representative John Brademas of Indiana vehemently disagreed. It was reported that Gov. Handley rejected approximately $700,000 to improve the library services.

Overall, the LSA had a major positive impact on libraries throughout the rest of the country. An additional 5 million books and other informational and educational materials were secured for rural communities. Many libraries noted a 40% or more increase in book circulation as well, along with a 32% increase in interlibrary loans.

Other accomplishments included 288 bookmobiles for rural communities and 800 new library staff members. Multitype and public library systems were established due to the LSA as well. When the Library Services and Construction Act became effective in 1964, the formation of regional and statewide library networks continued to grow.

The LSA was set to expire in 1961, but plans were already in motion to prolong the act. On May 26, 1960, the Senate passed a five-year extension without a single opposing vote.

An Allerton Park Institute on the Impact of the Library Services Act was held in 1962 jointly sponsored by the University of Illinois, Graduate School of Library Science and United States Office of Education, Library Services Branch. 1962.

Only a few years later, the Library Services and Construction Act would be introduced replacing the Library Services Act.

== See also ==
- List of libraries in the United States
- Public libraries in the United States
