= J. B. Lippincott & Co. =

American publishing house founded in 1836

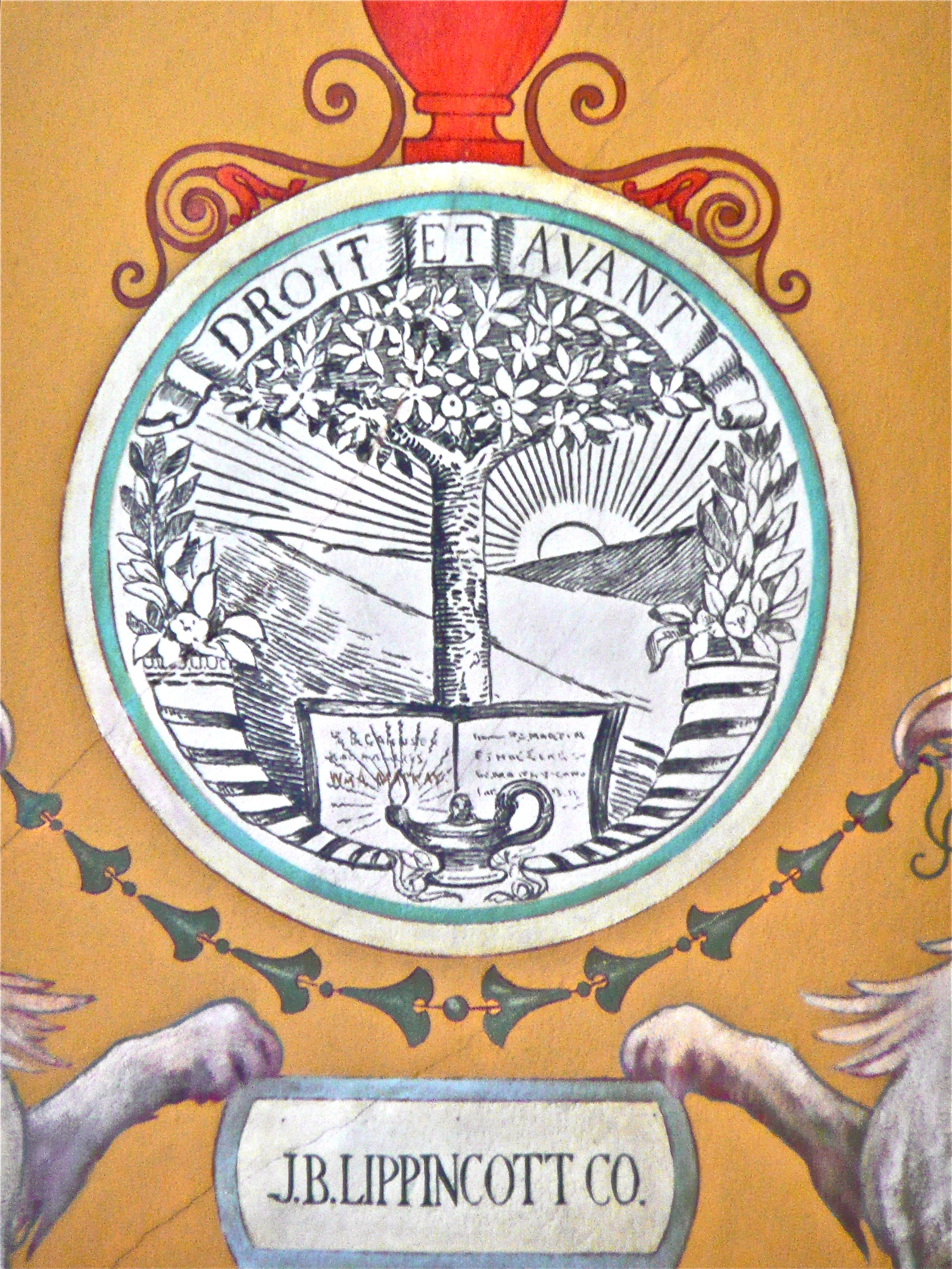
- Status: Defunct
- Founded: 1836
- Founder: Joshua Ballinger Lippincott
- Successor: Lippincott Williams & Wilkins, Wolters Kluwer Health (medicine, nursing, health professions); HarperCollins (adult, junior)
- Country of origin: United States
- Headquarters location: Philadelphia, Pennsylvania, U.S.
- Publication types: Books, journals, magazines, electronic media
- Imprints: Lippincott, Ballinger, Lippincott-Raven, LWW

J. B. Lippincott & Co. was an American publishing house founded in Philadelphia, Pennsylvania, in 1836 by Joshua Ballinger Lippincott. It was incorporated in 1885 as J. B. Lippincott Company.

== History ==
=== 19th century ===
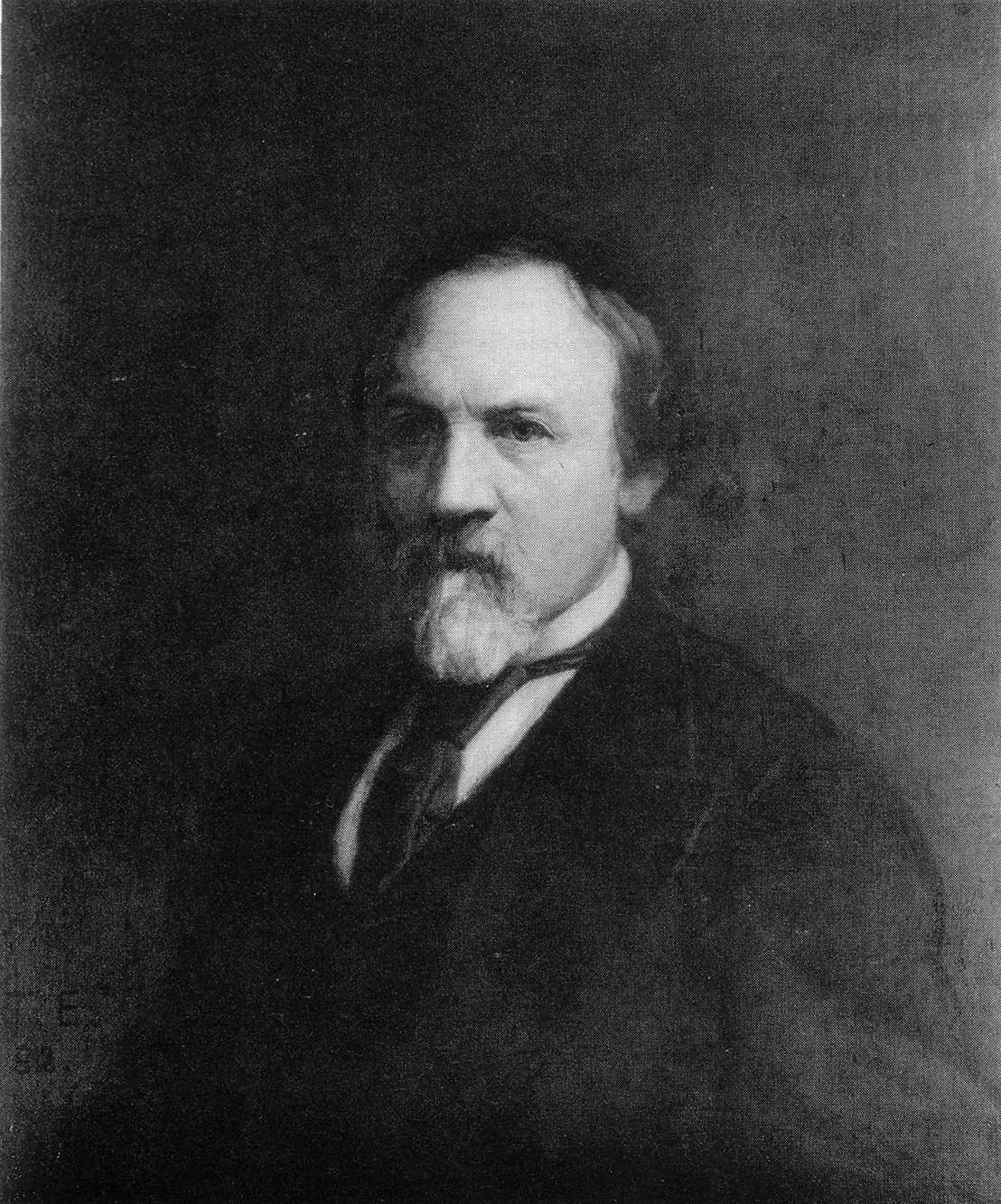
A portrait of Joshua Ballinger Lippincott by Thomas Eakins

Joshua Ballinger Lippincott founded the publishing company in Philadelphia when he was 23 years old. J. B. Lippincott & Co. began business publishing Bibles and prayer books before expanding into history, biography, fiction, poetry, and gift books. The company later added almanacs, medicine and law, school textbooks, and dictionaries.

In 1849, Lippincott acquired Grigg, Elliot & Co., a significant publisher and wholesaler whose origins dated back to printer and bookseller Benjamin and Jacob Johnson in 1792. In 1850 J. B. Lippincott & Co. became Lippincott, Grambo & Co. but reverted to its former name in 1855. The company was incorporated in 1878 as J. B. Lippincott Company.

Lippincott published the first textbook of nursing in the U.S. in 1878 and the first issue of the American Journal of Nursing in 1900. By the end of the 19th century, Lippincott was one of the largest and best-known publishers in the world. Lippincott's Monthly Magazine, a popular periodical containing a complete novel, short stories, poetry, and opinion, was published in the U.S. and the UK from 1868 to 1914.

=== 20th century ===
During the 20th century, Lippincott also became a major publisher of schoolbooks for elementary and high school education and of references, textbooks, and journals in medicine and nursing. In 1961, Lippincott acquired the religious publisher A. J. Holman, which was headquartered in the A.J. Holman and Company building.

In 1978, J. B. Lippincott Company was acquired by Harper & Row Publishers, Inc. A. J. Holman was sold to the Sunday School Board of the Southern Baptist Convention in 1979. Lippincott's trade, juvenile and elementary and high school divisions were merged into Harper's. The remaining publishing activities, in medicine, nursing, and allied health, were combined with Harper's programs to form "J.B. Lippincott—the Health Professions Publisher of Harper & Row". In 1990, Lippincott was acquired by Wolters Kluwer N.V. of The Netherlands. J. B. Lippincott Company celebrated its 200th anniversary in 1992.

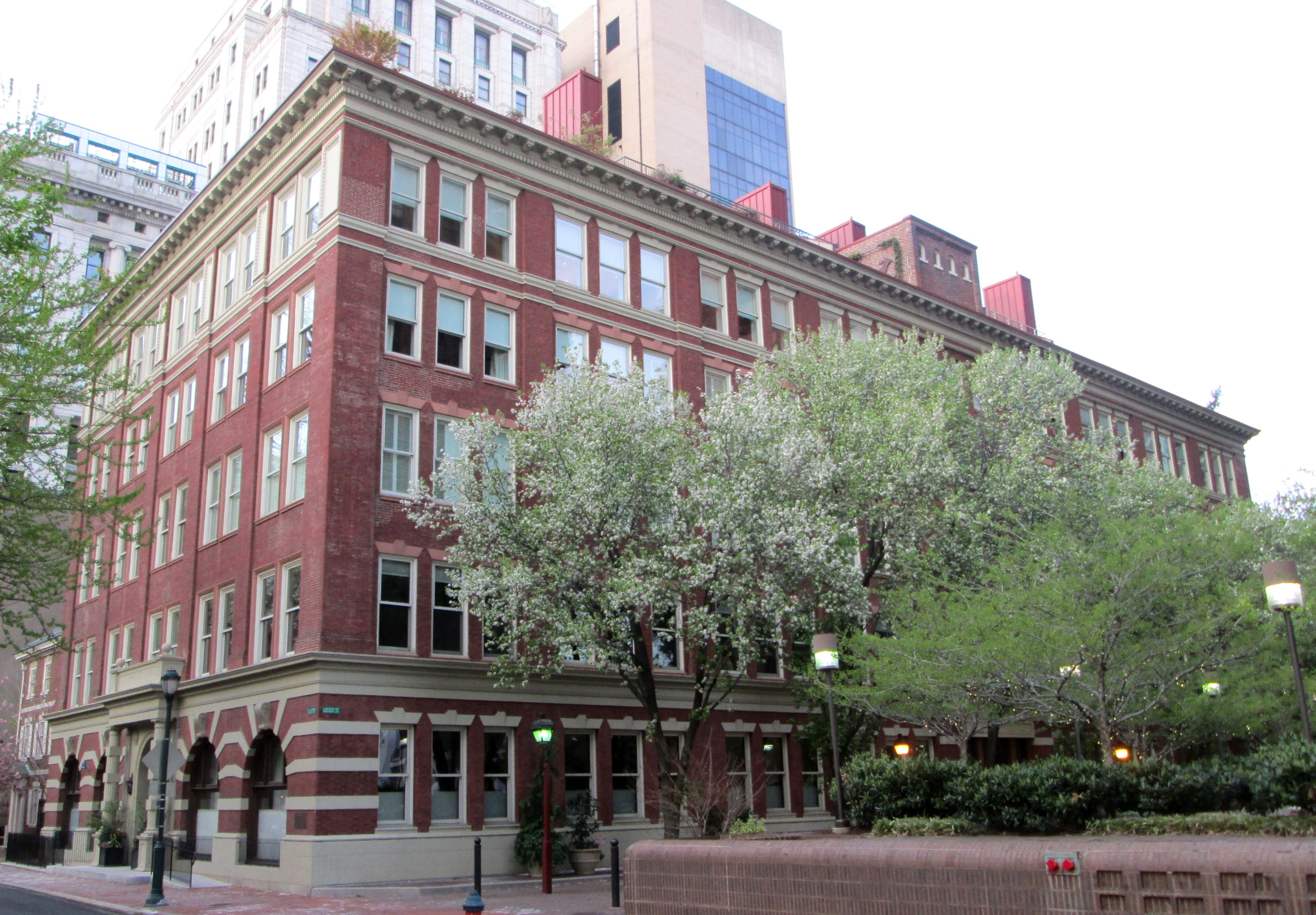
The J. B. Lippincott Headquarters Building, built in 1900 at 227 S. 6th Street in Philadelphia, designed by William B. Pritchett in the Italianate style; in 2005, it was converted to a 33-unit luxury condo building.

Wolters Kluwer merged Lippincott with its other medical publisher, Raven Press, in 1996 to form Lippincott-Raven Publishers.

In 1998, Wolters Kluwer acquired medical publisher Williams & Wilkins and combined it with Lippincott-Raven to form Lippincott Williams & Wilkins.

=== 21st century ===
After further internal reorganization at Wolters Kluwer in 2002, Lippincott Williams & Wilkins ceased to exist as an operational entity; instead, the names Lippincott Williams & Wilkins and Lippincott are now used solely as brands and publishing imprints of Wolters Kluwer Health.

== Leadership ==
Presidents of J. B. Lippincott Company

- Joshua Ballinger Lippincott (1885–1886)
- Craige Lippincott (1886–1911)
- J. Bertram Lippincott (1911–1926), (Chairman, 1926–1940)
- Joseph Wharton Lippincott (1926–1949), (Chairman, 1949–1958)
- Howard K. Bauernfeind (1949–1958), (Chairman, 1958–1973)
- Joseph W. Lippincott Jr. (1958–1978), (Chairman 1974–1978)
- Barton H. Lippincott (1978–1981), (Chairman, 1981–1987)
- Edward B. Hutton Jr. (1981–1983)
- Lewis Reines (1985–1986)
- Peter D. Nalle (1987–1990)
- Alan M. Edelson (1990–1994)
- Mary Martin Rogers (1995–1996)

Co-Presidents of Lippincott-Raven Publishers

- Mary Martin Rogers and Joseph W. Lippincott III (1996–1998)

Co-Presidents of Lippincott Williams & Wilkins

- Edward B. Hutton Jr. and Joseph W. Lippincott III (1998–2000)
- Jeffrey Smith and Tim Satterfield (2000–2002)

== Notable authors ==
- Edward Abbey
- Henry Adams
- James Baldwin
- Hall Caine
- Harper Lee
- Vincent T. DeVita
- Arthur Conan Doyle
- Mary Henderson Eastman
- Leon Edel
- Nikki Giovanni
- Gwethalyn Graham
- Grace Livingston Hill
- Zora Neale Hurston
- Henry James
- Rudyard Kipling
- L. L. Langstroth
- Jack London
- Stanley Loomis
- Betty MacDonald
- John D. MacDonald
- L. M. Montgomery
- Christopher Morley
- Alfred Noyes
- Mary O'Hara
- Thomas Pynchon
- Piers Paul Read
- Rufus Rockwell Wilson
- Steven Rosenberg
- Alvin Schwartz
- Amélie Rives Troubetzkoy
- Dalton Trumbo
- Oscar Wilde
- Forrest Wilson
- Sir Samuel White Baker

== See also ==
- Edward Stratton Holloway, the company's art director for 46 years
- History of books
