= Carleton B. Joeckel =

American librarian, soldier, and writer

- Born: January 2, 1886; Lake Mills, Wisconsin
- Died: April 15, 1960 (aged 74); Oakland, California
- Education: New York State Library School (A.B.), University of Michigan (M.A.), University of Chicago Graduate Library School(Ph.D)
- Occupations: librarian, author, and advocate
- Known for: A National Plan for Public Library Service (1948), co-written with Amy Winslow, that provided foundation for nationwide public library services.

Carleton Bruns Joeckel (January 2, 1886 – April 15, 1960) was an American librarian, advocate, scholar, decorated soldier, and co-writer, with Enoch Pratt Free Library (Baltimore) Assistant Director Amy Winslow, of A National Plan for Public Library Service (1948) that provided the foundation for nationwide public library services.

== Early years ==
Joeckel was born on January 2, 1886, in Lake Mills, Wisconsin. He attended the University of Wisconsin in Madison where he received his Artium Baccalaureus (A.B.) in 1908. Upon completion of his first degree, Joeckel traveled to Albany, New York where he received his Bachelor's in Library Science at the New York State Library School (1890–1911) in 1910. His first job was as a secretary to the librarian at St. Louis Public Library in Missouri.

== Berkeley years ==
After a brief year in St. Louis, Joeckel travelled to the West Coast in 1911 to take on the job of Assistant Reference Librarian (1911–1912) and later Superintendent of Circulation (1912–1914) at the University of California, Berkeley Library. In 1914 he was offered the position of Director of the Berkeley Public Library, replacing David R. Moore who had been the Library's first director following the building's completion in 1905. During his tenure at the Berkeley Public Library, book circulation "more than tripled" and three additional branches were built. Joeckel taught Public Library Administration at what was then the undergraduate Department of Library Science in UC Berkeley's College of Letters and Science; this evolved into the graduate School of Librarianship in 1926, now known as the UC Berkeley School of Information.

== World War I years ==
Joeckel took a leave of absence from 1917–1919 and served as operations officer with the American Expeditionary Forces, 363rd Infantry of the United States Army during the Allied Forces' campaign against the Germans in World War I; he achieved the rank of captain. Captain Joeckel was responsible for carrying messages under heavy shell fire during the Meuse-Argonne offensive in France from September 26 to October 1, 1918; for his courage under fire, Captain Joeckel received the Silver Star citation in 1919. Joeckel was wounded during the battle and returned to the US.

Following his return to Berkeley, he gave suggestions at the 24th annual meeting of the California Library Association (CLA), which focused on post-war issues, on how best to engage service men faced with the challenge of returning to civilian life. Joeckel was elected president of the California Library Association that same year and served from 1919-1920.

== Midwest years ==
Joeckel resigned from the Library in 1927 and returned to the Midwest to become an Associate Professor in the Department of Library Science at the University of Michigan, which then only provided a bachelor's degree in Library Science; he was appointed professor in 1930 when Library Science offered a graduate program as well. His strengths were in teaching library administration and book selection. Joeckel simultaneously pursued additional studies at the University and received his Master's of Arts in Political Science in 1928. While attending the annual meeting of the Michigan Library Association (MLA) in 1929, he proposed the concept of "larger units of library service," an idea then considered "audacious. Joeckel served as president of the Michigan Library Association from 1930-1931.

Joeckel moved to Chicago when he received a Carnegie Fellowship at the age of forty-seven to attend the University of Chicago Graduate Library School (1933–34). Upon completion of his fellowship, he received his doctorate and was offered a faculty position in 1935. Joeckel's 1935 dissertation entitled, The Government of the American Public Library, examined the public library and its relationship to the government.; it is considered, "a classic in library literature.". This seminal work was honored with the ALA's James Terry White Award for "exemplary writing" in 1938.

Joeckel was dissertation adviser to Eliza Atkins Gleason, the first Black American to earn a doctorate in library science. Gleason's dissertation, "The Government and Administration of Public Library Service to Negroes in the South," changed the way librarians thought about public library service. He was also an influence on Lowell A. Martin especially on the concepts of extension and regional planning.

== Library advocacy years (1930s and 1940s) ==
=== The 1930s ===
Joeckel's interest in drawing attention to public library administration and increasing federal support for libraries coincided with a push by the American Library Association under the leadership of Executive Secretary Carl H. Milam (1920–1948) to increase federal support for state libraries and make library materials available throughout the nation. To promote the ALA's National Plan, its President Charles H. Compton appointed Joeckel to head the Federal Relations Committee in 1934.

In 1937 Joeckel and his University of Chicago colleague Leon Carnovsky undertook a year-long study of the Chicago Public Library. They published their results and recommendations regarding the importance of effective organization administration in a book entitled, A Metropolitan Library in Action: a survey of the Chicago Public Library (1940). Also in 1937, Congress authorized funds to establish a Library Services Division in the US Office of Education. Joeckel noted the importance of this federal institution: "prior to the establishment of this Division, there was no Federal office directly responsible for leadership in a nation-wide program of library development."

=== The 1940s ===
In 1941 Joeckel was appointed chair of the ALA's Post-War Planning Committee. The same year, the Librarian of Congress, Archibald MacLeish, appointed by Franklin Delano Roosevelt against the strong objections of the ALA tasked a special Librarian's Committee in 1941 to analyze its operations. Joeckel headed up this committee and prepared a report that would act as, "a catalyst" for MacLeish's reorganization of the Library over the next three years. In furtherance of the ALA Planning Committee's objectives, the committee published Post-War Standards for Public Libraries in 1943 under Joeckel's leadership.

In 1944, as Dean of Chicago's Graduate Library School, Dr. Joeckel organized a Library Institute. The papers prepared at this Institute addressed three areas: (1) library service organization at the local level; (2) role of the state, and (3) state and federal aid to libraries. These papers influenced Joeckel's ongoing advocacy of nationwide cooperation culminating with the publication of Joeckel and Amy Winslow's A National Plan for Public Library Service in 1948. Their publication highlighted inequalities among libraries intra and interstate and, "proposed a nationwide minimum standard of library service and support below which no library should fall." In hindsight the observation of Carl Milam (Executive Secretary of the ALA from 1920–48) in the foreword that this Plan changed the direction of public library development in the United States was correct,

In the fifty-year history of the American Library Association's Washington Office, Molumby summarized the role of Joeckel in establishing the need for federal support for libraries.

== The final years ==
After his tenure as Dean of Chicago's Graduate Library School from 1942–1945, Joeckel resigned from his position and headed back to Berkeley to become Professor at the graduate School of Librarianship and spend more time on research and writing. After taking a leave of absence in 1949 for health reasons, Joeckel retired a year later.

Even in retirement, Joeckel's publications inspired others. He is credited with influencing the passage of the Library Services Act in 1956, which increased library services particularly to rural areas. Former California State Librarian Carma Leigh noted that in Joeckel's writings, "we find the genesis of much that is now in the federal laws and regulation which make federal financial assistance available to public, school and higher education libraries."There are major elements of Joeckel's vision in virtual libraries that developed in the 1990s.

On April 15, 1960, he died in Oakland, California.

== Awards ==
- Silver Star citation (1919) for courageous military service
- Carnegie Fellowship recipient (1933)
- James Terry White Award (1938) for exemplary professional writing
- Joseph W. Lippincott Award (1958) for distinguished service to the profession
- American Library Association Honorary Membership.
- California Library Hall of Fame. 2015.

== Selected publications ==
- Joeckel Carleton B. 1935. The Government of the American Public Library. Chicago Ill: University of Chicago Press.
- Joeckel, C.B. & Carnovsky, L.(1940) A Metropolitan Library in Action: A Survey of the Chicago Public Library. Chicago: University of Chicago Press.
- Joeckel, C.B.(1938) Library Service Staff Study, No. 11 for the Advisory Committee on Education. Washington, D.C.: Government Printing Office.
- Joeckel, C.B. “Regional Library Service.” ALA Bulletin 35, no. 9 (1941): 469–70.
- Joeckel, C.B. Chairman of the ALA Post-War Planning Committee (1943).Post-War Standards for Public Libraries. Chicago: American Library Association.
- Joeckel, C.B. ed. (1946). Library Extension, Problems and Solutions.Chicago: University of Chicago Press.
- Joeckel, C.B. & Winslow, A. (1948). A National Plan for Public Library Service. Chicago: American Library Association.
