= Yerba Buena Gardens =

Two blocks of public parks in San Francisco, California

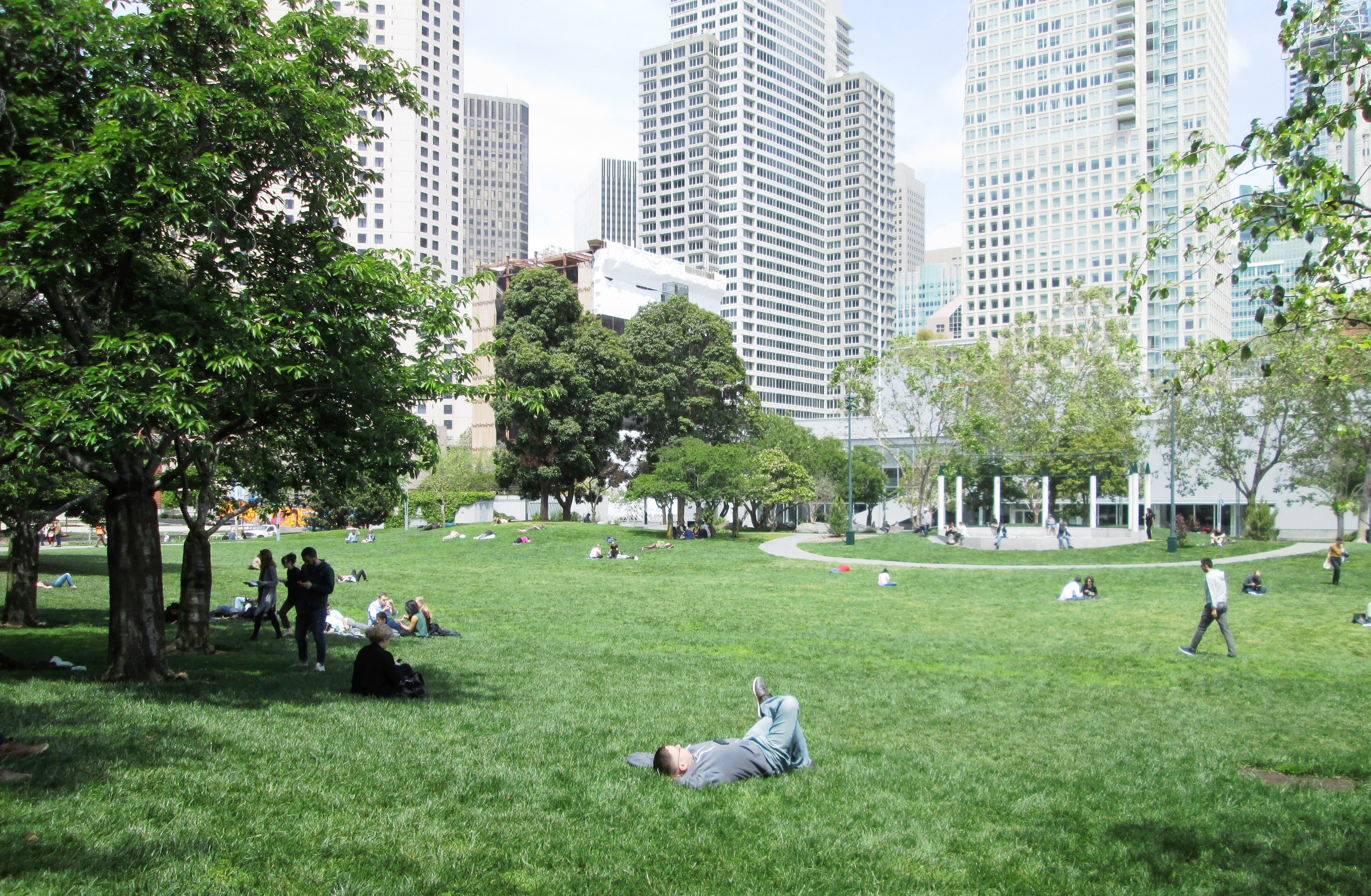
- (2017)

- Location within San Francisco County
- Type: Urban
- Location: South of Market, San Francisco, California
- Nearest city: San Francisco
- Coordinates: 37°47′05″N 122°24′10″W
- Created: 1993
- Founder: The Rouse Company, Olympia & York and the San Francisco Redevelopment Agency
- Operator: Yerba Buena Gardens Conservancy
- Open: All year
- Status: Open

Yerba Buena Gardens is the name for two blocks of public parks located between Third and Fourth, Mission and Folsom Streets in the South of Market (SoMA) neighbourhood of San Francisco, California. The first block bordered by Mission and Howard Streets was opened on October 11, 1993. The second block, between Howard and Folsom Streets, was opened in 1998, with a dedication to Martin Luther King Jr. by Mayor Willie Brown. A pedestrian bridge over Howard Street connects the two blocks, sitting on top of part of the Moscone Center convention center. The Yerba Buena Gardens were planned and built as the final centerpiece of the Yerba Buena Redevelopment Area which includes the Yerba Buena Center for the Arts. Yerba Buena Gardens Conservancy operates the property on behalf of the City and County of San Francisco.

Yerba Buena was the name of the town in the Mexican territory of Alta California that became the city of San Francisco, California, after it was claimed by the United States in 1846. It was itself named after the yerba buena (Clinopodium douglasii) plant which used to be abundant in the area. The plant's common name, yerba buena, is an alternate form of the Spanish hierba buena (meaning "good herb").

== History ==
The idea of a conference center named the Yerba Buena Center itself first emerged in the early 1960s. At that time there was a concern about how development could occur in the downtown area. The South of Market area offered hundreds of acres of flat land at low land prices. Various corporate committees were founded to lobby for the redevelopment, which would also include high-rise office buildings, a vast parking garage, and a sports center. At the center of operations was the San Francisco Redevelopment Agency (SFRA) first headed by Joseph Alioto, who would go on to become mayor of the city in 1968. The area of the development was regarded as a blighted area of the city, even referred to by local media, local business and city officials as 'skid row'. However, the developers did not figure on the persistence of the local community, the vast majority of which were aged, male, ex-industrial workers who lived alone in the many cheap hotels in the area. Together the latter formed the Tenants and Owners in Opposition to Redevelopment (TOOR). Their demand was to be rehoused in the area in low-rent housing. The case went to court where the judge, Stan Weigel, judged in favor of TOOR. Things changed with the election of a new city mayor, George Moscone, in 1976, who spearheaded construction. The Gardens was later built as part of a deal by Mayor Moscone with developers to "set aside land and funds for cultural institutions such as museums, exhibits, and theaters."

Columbia-based Rouse Co. transformed the former Skid Row building into a festival marketplace for $350 million.

== Reception ==
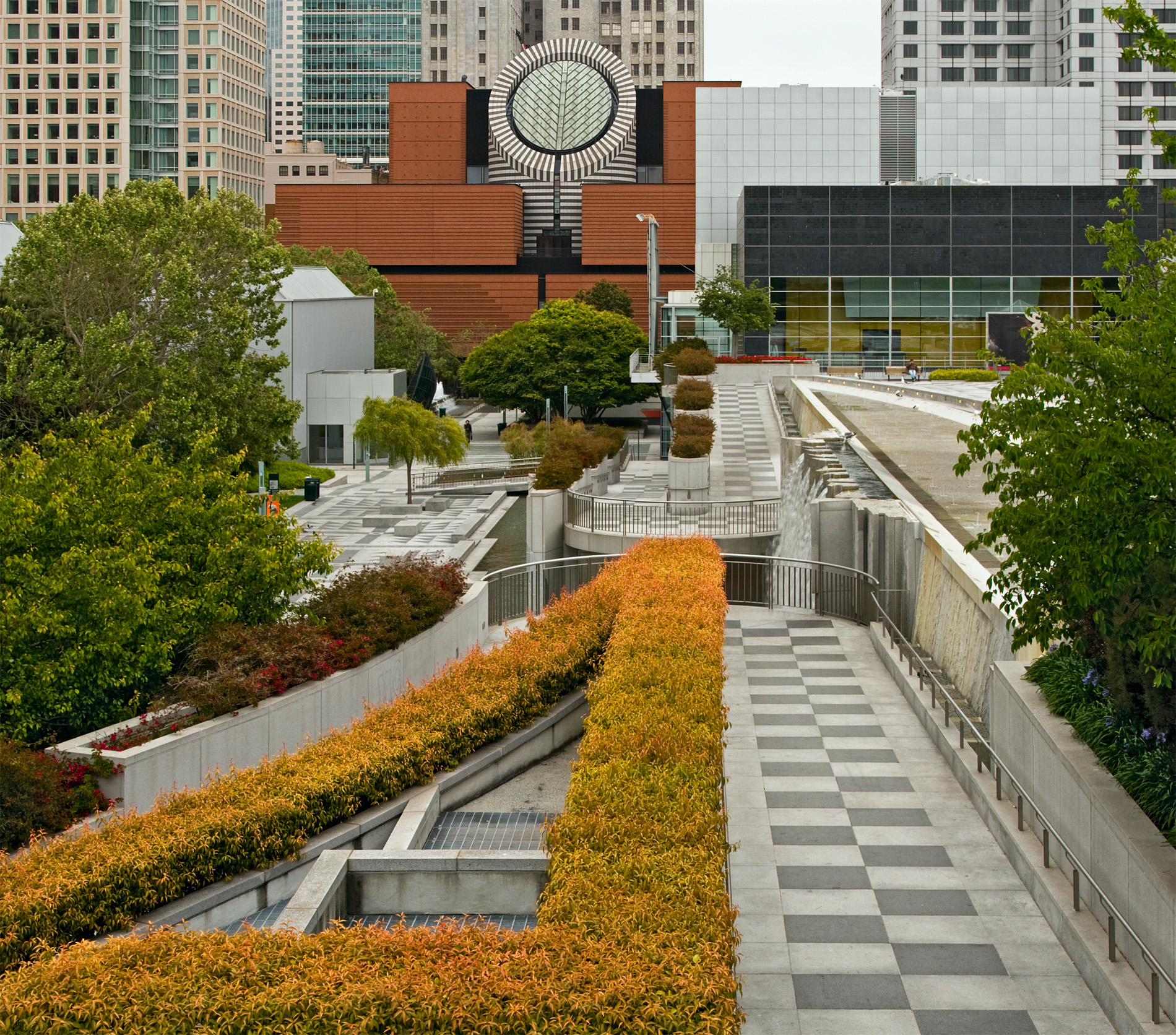
Walkways in Yerba Buena Gardens (with SFMOMA in the background)

In 1999 the Yerba Buena Gardens received the Gold Medal of the biannual Rudy Bruner Award for Urban Excellence. In praising the design of the work, the jury noted the process that led to the creation of the gardens, as well as its inclusiveness in terms of the population it serves and its neighborhood: "The mixed-use development enables cultural, social justice, and economic development agendas to coexist within a network of collaborative management practices." Furthermore, the jury "applauded the evolution of the project's development process to an inclusive model involving multiple constituencies." However, in his history of the development of San Francisco from the 1950s to the 1990s Chester Hartman recounts that the entire Yerba Buena project was long drawn out over 3 decades, born of a local struggle that included evictions and harassment of the previous tenants in the area, most of them old and poor, but who had joined to fight for their rights. Even during the final design stages there were struggles regarding the building program. After John Elberling, of the Tenants and Owners Development Corporation (TODCO) protested the removal of a bowling alley from the plans, the San Francisco Development Agency (SFRA) backed down and the bowling alley was re-included and eventually built.

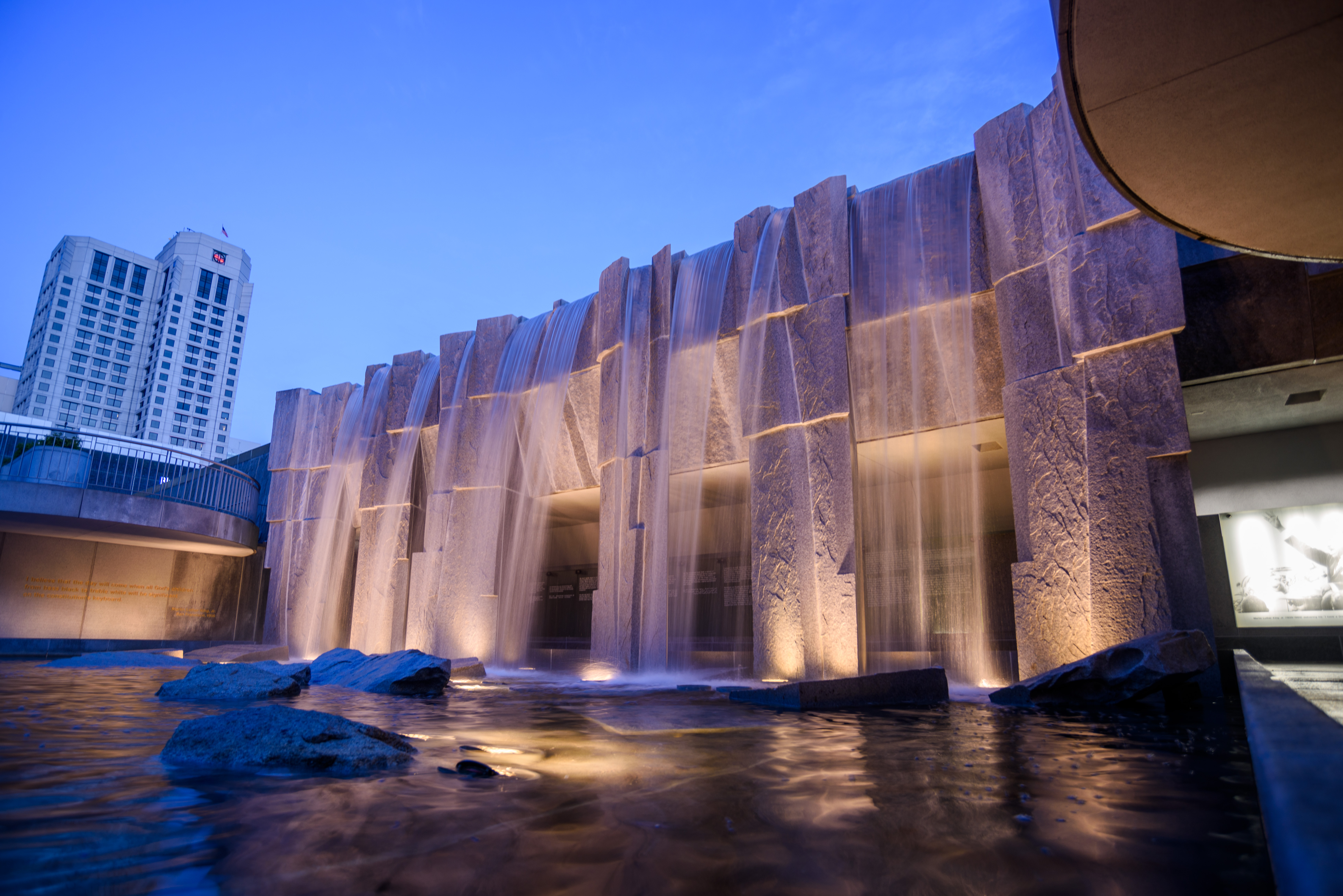
Lights below the surface of the water illuminate the waterfalls of the Martin Luther King Jr. Memorial.

== Public art ==
The original block opened in 1993 contains several public art installations. One cornerstone is the Martin Luther King Jr. Memorial and Fountain. The King memorial, titled "Revelations," consists of large, etched glass excerpts of King's speeches in the languages of San Francisco's sister cities. The entire memorial was a collaborative project between sculptor Houston Conwill, poet Estella Majoza and architect Joseph De Pace.

Conwill said Revelations is “a sacred space … meant to be experienced as a cultural pilgrimage and a journey of transformation.” The act of entering the fountain from the Gardens, reading of the text from North wall to East then, South Wall while beneath the water, then exiting back out into the garden, represents 'a cultural pilgrimage and contemplative metaphorical journey of transformation,' parallel to the Southern tradition of baptism by full immersion in water common within Old School Baptist churches like those of King's grandfather, legendary minister Adam Daniel Williams. On the terrace level above the waterfall is the Sister Cities Garden, where visitors can see a manicured garden with plants representing each of San Francisco's sister cities and a view of the downtown skyline.

== Other attractions ==
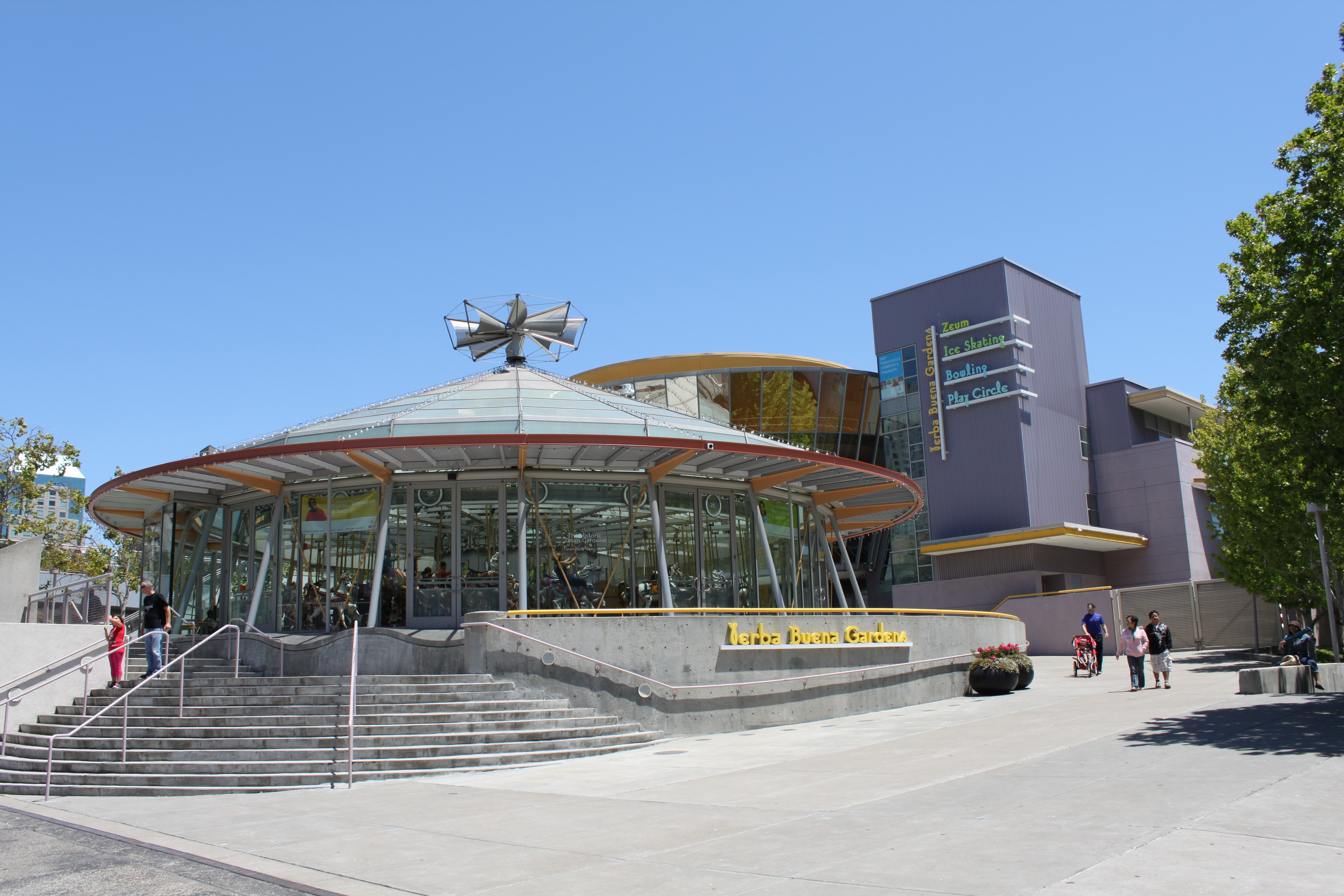
The LeRoy King Carousel at Children's Creativity Museum

Located in the Gardens proper are the Yerba Buena Center for the Arts, a contemporary arts center in the North block, and the Children's Creativity Museum, a children's museum in the South block. An ice skating rink, a bowling alley, and the LeRoy King Carousel -— a restored 1906 carousel by Charles I. D. Looff can also be found in the South block.

The Mexican Museum is (as of 2021) planned to inhabit the lower several floors of a building across Mission Street as part the 53-story 706 Mission / Four Seasons Residence tower. The project is planned to cost $500 million ($30 million of which for the museum) and will complete the "Yerba Buena district" redevelopment area, which apart from the Yerba Buena Gardens includes the Metreon and Moscone Center.

== See also ==
- List of memorials to Martin Luther King Jr.
