= 2019 San Francisco mayoral election =

- November 5, 2019
- Turnout: 41.64% (▼10.97 pp)
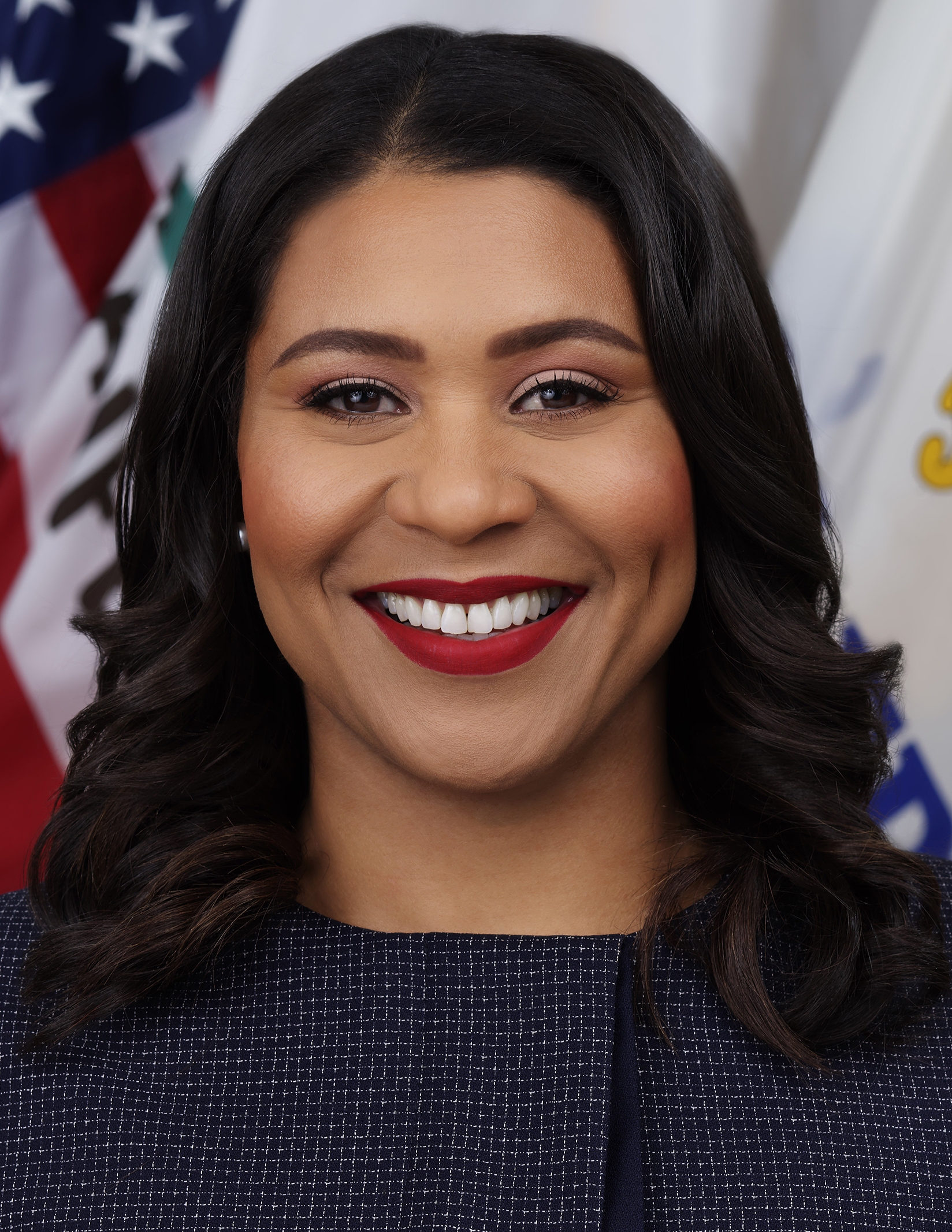

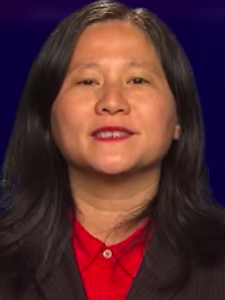

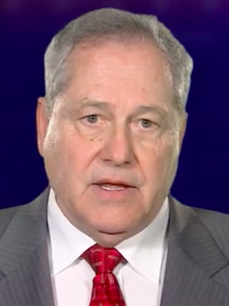
Candidate	London Breed	Ellen Lee Zhou	Joel Ventresca
Popular vote	126,221	25,006	13,283
Percentage	70.3%	13.9%	7.40%
- County supervisorial district results Breed: 50–60% 60–70% 70–80%
Mayor before election
London Breed
Elected mayor
London Breed

The election for mayor of the City and County of San Francisco was held on November 5, 2019. Incumbent mayor London Breed, who had previously been elected in a special election to fill the unexpired term of the late Mayor Ed Lee, was reelected to a first full term in office. All local elections in California are nonpartisan.

== Background ==
London Breed was elected Mayor of San Francisco in a 2018 special election to serve until 2020, filling the unexpired term of Ed Lee, who was elected in 2011 and 2015, and died in office on December 12, 2017. Breed stood for election to a first full term in office in 2019.

== Candidates ==
The filing deadline was 5 p.m. on June 11, 2019. Among the candidates who qualified, only the incumbent mayor Breed had a traditional political background.

=== Qualified ===
- Ellen Lee Zhou, social worker and candidate for mayor in 2018
- Joel Ventresca, retired San Francisco International Airport administrative analyst and perennial candidate in the 1990s
- London Breed, incumbent mayor of San Francisco
- Paul Ybarra Robertson
- Robert Jordan, street minister and San Francisco Board of Supervisors candidate from District 6 in 2006
- Wilma Pang, professional singer/music educator and perennial candidate

=== Declined ===
- Mark Farrell, 44th Mayor of San Francisco, former Supervisor from District 2
- Mark Leno, former State Senator, former State Assemblyman, former San Francisco Supervisor representing District 8; candidate for mayor in 2018 special election

== Campaign ==
Ellen Lee Zhou was the conservative candidate in the race, running a campaign with pro-Donald Trump and pro-gun messaging. Her campaign also criticized the city government's handling of homelessness. Shortly before the election, she erected a billboard on Dore Street featuring a caricature of Breed that many San Francisco politicians described as racist.

Joel Ventresca was endorsed by the San Francisco Green Party.

London Breed was in office and thus was considered the incumbent of this electoral race. She won a special election the year prior due to the death of the previous mayor, Ed Lee.

== Results ==
The election used instant-runoff voting, also known as ranked-choice voting. However, Breed was reelected with a majority of the vote in the first round, and no transferring of votes was required. Although California municipal elections are nonpartisan, Ellen Lee Zhou, the second-place finisher and a self-described Republican, had the best performance for a candidate of her party in a San Francisco mayoral race since John Barbagelata in 1975.

2019 San Francisco mayoral election
Candidate	Maximum round	Maximum votes	Share in maximum round	Maximum votes First round votesTransfer votes
London Breed (incumbent)	1	126,221	70.28%	
Ellen Lee Zhou	1	25,006	13.92%	
Joel Ventresca	1	13,283	7.40%	
Paul Ybarra Robertson	1	7,649	4.26%	
Wilma Pang	1	4,963	2.76%	
Robert L. Jordan, Jr.	1	2,458	1.37%	
Marc Roth (write-in candidate)	1	7	0.00%	

2019 San Francisco mayoral election First Round Ballot Summary
	Count	Share of Contest Ballots
Continuing Votes	179,587	87.13%
Over Votes	603	0.29%
Under Votes	25,927	12.58%
Contest Ballots	206,117	100.00%
Registered Voters	495,050	
Contest Turnout	41.64%	

== Future ==
In November 2022, San Francisco voters approved Proposition H, moving all future citywide elections to years that are multiples of four (thereby coinciding with presidential elections), beginning with 2024, and extending for one year the terms of incumbent citywide officeholders, including Breed. As a result, the mayoral term resulting from the 2019 election will now expire in January 2025 instead of January 2024 as originally planned.
