= Jesse Keyes =

American design entrepreneur (born 1971)

Jesse Keys
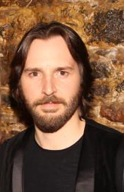
- Born: December 15, 1971 (age 54)
- Education: Princeton University, Columbia University, Universitat Politècnica de Catalunya, Bloustein School of Planning
- Occupation: Designer
- Years active: 1998 - present
- Known for: One Seventh Avenue South; Karolina Zmarlak; DC Keyes Residence; Hotel Griffou; E_P; XIX; KZ_K Studio
- Awards: Fulbright Fellowship, GSAPP Kinne Fellowship

Jesse Keyes (born December 15, 1971) is an American design entrepreneur. He developed One 7th Avenue South and created and co-owns the restaurant Hotel Griffou and the fashion label Karolina Zmarlak.

== Early life ==
Born in Stanford, California, Keyes studied urban planning at the Woodrow Wilson School of Princeton University, earning a B.A. in 1995. He was awarded a Fulbright Fellowship to study architecture in Barcelona where he earned a master's degree from the Universitat Politècnica de Catalunya in 1997. He received a Masters of Science from the Columbia Graduate School of Architecture, Planning and Preservation in 1999. He completed a Master of Philosophy (M.Phil.) in urban planning from the Bloustein School in 2016.

== Career ==
Keyes founded MODO to house his spatially based endeavors to use modern techniques in fashion, design, and building under one roof.

in 2008, Keyes completed the development of One Seventh Avenue South, a triangular condominium building in downtown Manhattan where Keyes "was looking for a development opportunity," he said, "to make a statement." He is co-owner and operating partner at Hotel Griffou where the design makes reference to New York's past. The house "embodies the essential modernist tenet of building what you need and nothing more." MODO designed and developed the Intent Media work environment.

Keyes is the co-founder and Executive Producer of the Karolina Zmarlak product development studio, known as KZ_K Studio. Keyes worked with Zmarlak to make conceptual and versatile pieces. With Zmarlak, their fashion label was selected as one of sixty "Premier Designers" in the uppermost design category at Neiman Marcus Direct. Keyes produced a film for Zmarlak that was launched on W Magazine's Fashion Film series: "Double Identity/Podwojna Tozsamosc was inspired by Women of Communism in Poland." The partners maintain a "commitment to using luxury fabrications and focusing on craftsmanship." The studio's product designs are undergirded by "Modernist European tailoring with innovative techniques." Vogue has covered the designs, launching fashion films produced by Keyes, and stating that "convertibility" is the studio's “thing."

Keyes designed E_P in the basement of the old CBGB, which is now below the John Varvatos boutique on the Bowery. He also designed the XIX lounge on Kenmare Street. He wrote a column for Blackbook Magazine, entitled "Dark Design," concerning the aesthetics of nightlife.

For President Barack Obama's second inauguration, Keyes hosted a gathering for around 400 guests-including John Legend and Chrissy Teigen, Paula Abdul, Sophia Bush, and Zmarlak at the residence of his grandfather, architect Arthur H. Keyes.

Keyes and Zmarlak opened a new studio under the KZ_K Studio label on Great Jones Street in Manhattan in 2022. The studio had its launch event on April 12, 2022.
