= Tenants and Owners Development Corporation =

American nonprofit organization

- Formation: 1971
- Type: Nonprofit
- Headquarters: San Francisco, California
- Key people: John Elberling (President)
- Website: todco.org

Tenants and Owners Development Corporation, also known as TODCO, is a nonprofit organization that owns eight low-income apartment buildings in the South of Market neighborhood of San Francisco, California. Founded to oppose the redevelopment of the Yerba Buena corridor, the organization is a prominent and influential opponent of housing construction in San Francisco.

== History ==
TODCO was founded in 1971 as a coalition of South of Market tenants and building owners. It was formed in response to redevelopment of the Yerba Buena corridor.

In the 1980s and 1990s, TODCO built a set of low-income apartment buildings, concentrated on Sixth Street. Following this, TODCO redeveloped single-room-occupancy hotels on the street. In 1998, it completed a 24 unit development called The Leland Apartments for people with disabilities.

Since the early 2000s, the organization has not built more housing, but remains active in local advocacy. The organization derives resources from the rising value of its properties, a consequence of skyrocketing property prices in San Francisco. The organization has used these resources to lobby against housing construction, as well as fund various other propositions. The organization has been criticized for using the windfalls of its operation on political advocacy rather than on its properties and resident services.

In 2015, TODCO supported a proposal to ban the construction of market-rate housing in the Mission District.

In 2020, San Francisco Board of Supervisors member Dean Preston convinced colleagues on the board to delay approval for thousands of housing units on underdeveloped lots on South Van Ness Avenue so that TODCO could perform a race and equity study on the project within six months. TODCO agreed to do the study. More than two years later, TODCO had not begun the study and the organization said it had no intent to do so.

In 2021, TODCO took a leading role in opposing the construction of a 495-unit apartment complex (25% of which would have been affordable housing) on a Nordstrom valet parking lot. As of 2022, that campaign is implicated in an ethics complaint about whether former Supervisor Jane Kim violated the law by not registering as a lobbyist for work opposing it.

On August 6, 2021, TODCO's Director of Community Development, Jon Jacobo, was accused of rape by a Bay Area housing activist. Jacobo resigned from TODCO in 2024.

In 2022, TODCO sponsored a San Francisco ballot measure, Proposition K, to tax e-commerce companies to fund a guaranteed basic income program. While originally intended to target large corporations such as Amazon, opponents later noted it was unlikely that the tax would apply to Amazon because more than 80% of its revenue comes from web services, exempting it from e-commerce taxes. Instead, Prop K would have raised taxes on many small businesses. On September 1, TODCO and Elberling successfully challenged their own measure in court to have it removed from the ballot. Although Elberling said, "Yes, it hurts to have made such a public mistake and have spent almost $450,000 on a flawed measure,” he vowed to introduce an improved proposition the following year that would target major corporations rather than small businesses.

In 2023, The San Francisco Standard published an article where tenants living in buildings operated by TODCO complained of conditions in the units. The Standard article wrote that TODCO used funds for political causes. The article reported that annual revenue for the organization's main nonprofit entity had doubled over the last decade while the amount of revenue spent on residents was reduced. The organization cited inflation for the reduction in maintenance funding, citing wages as an example. TODCO tripled the amount spent on employee salaries, which TODCO attributed to adding administrative and program staffing because it was "understaffed".

== Operations ==
There are 37 employees, as of 2023. TODCO provides affordable housing, resident services, and community advocacy for the South of Market neighborhood. According to author Chester Hartman, TODCO offers social services for its residents including a community clinic, case management and shopping transportation.

TODCO has sponsored a photography workshop at Seventh Street since 1991, established for residents of South of Market to have creative outlets during renovations. As of 2026, the workshop has been running for 35 years.

TODCO maintains an advocacy subsidiary. It donates to progressive campaigns related to community development and affordable housing-related initiatives. Since 2016, one focus has been to limit office space and market rate housing in favor of housing for lower and middle class.

As of 2019, TODCO oversaw eight affordable housing buildings comprising about 1,000 units. In 2021, this included three residential hotels on Sixth Street and five senior buildings near Yerba Buena Gardens. The John Stewart Company has a management contract to manage TODCO properties.

== Leadership ==
John Elberling is the president of TODCO. Elberling joined the group in 1978, when it had started construction on the first of its senior housing buildings. After joining TODCO, Elberling worked on the 1980s Prop. M campaign that limited office development. In 2021, the San Francisco Chronicle wrote that Eberling's "power to shape what does and does not get built in the South of Market has grown in recent years as he has spent freely on propositions, polling, lobbying and lawsuits." According to the Chronicle, Elberling lives rent-free in one of TODCO's affordable housing units, despite the fact that his salary is four times higher than the income he would need to qualify for the building. He also owns a 2,938-square-foot house in Sebastopol, in Sonoma County, California.
