= Transaction Publishers =

1962–2016 American publishing house

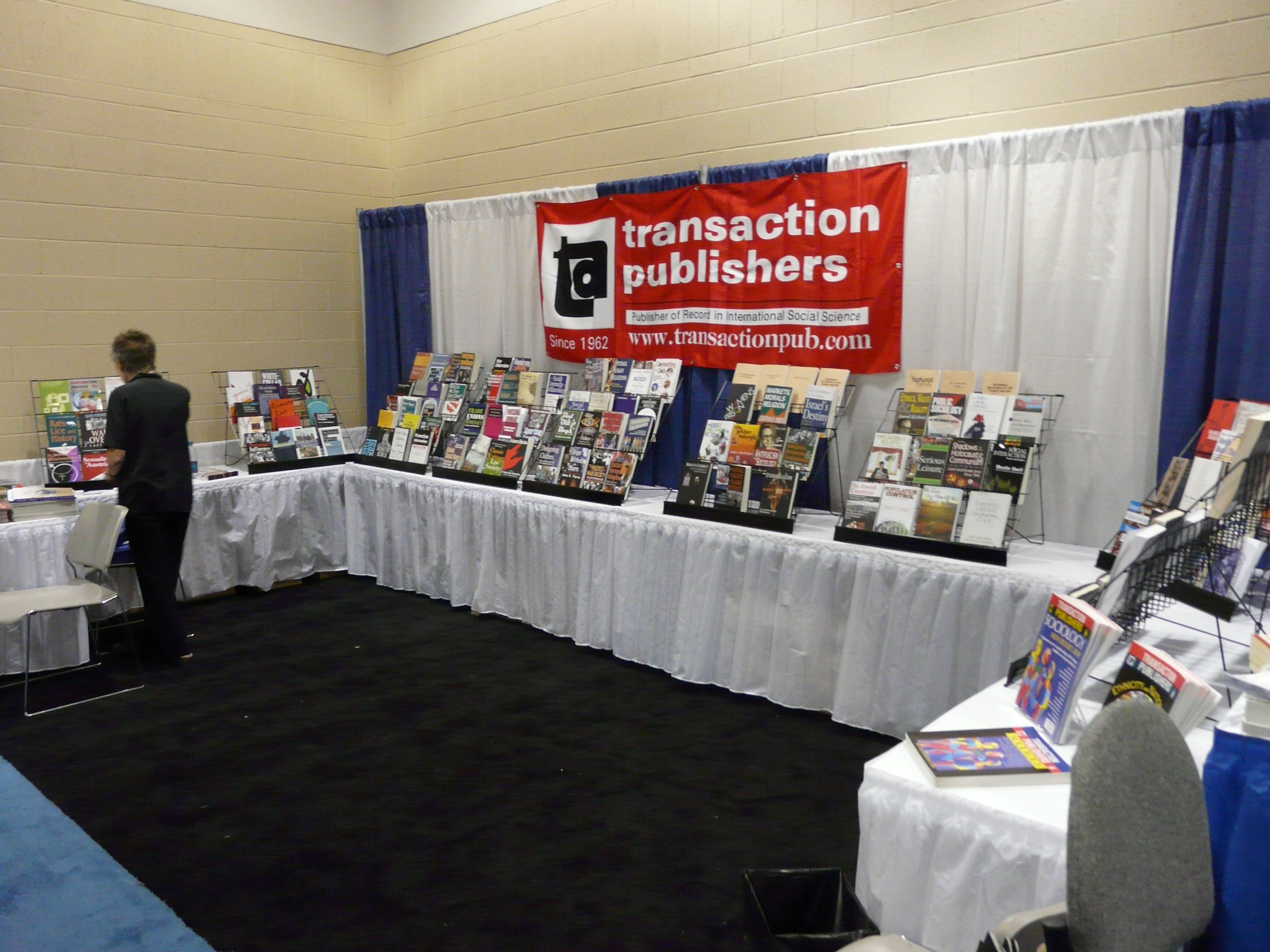
- 2008 conference booth
- Status: Defunct
- Founded: 1962 (64 years ago)
- Founders: Alvin Ward Gouldner, Lee Rainwater, and Irving Louis Horowitz
- Defunct: 2017 (9 years ago)
- Successor: Routledge
- Country of origin: United States
- Headquarters location: Piscataway, New Jersey
- Publication types: Books, academic journals
- Nonfiction topics: Social sciences
- Official website: transactionpub.com

Transaction Publishers was a New Jersey–based publishing house that specialized in social-science books and journals. It was located on the Livingston Campus of Rutgers University. The company was sold to Taylor & Francis in 2016 and merged with its Routledge imprint.

== History and operations ==
As of February 1, 2017, Transaction Publishers became a part of Routledge, of the Taylor & Francis Group.

Transaction was an academic publisher of the social sciences. It was founded by Irving Louis Horowitz, who served as Transaction's chairman of the board and editorial director until his death in 2012.

Transaction began on July 1, 1962, as part of a multiplex grant sponsored by the Ford Foundation at Washington University in St. Louis. From beginnings as a social-science magazine, Transaction: Social Science and Modern Society (later Society), Transaction Publishers evolved into a full-fledged publisher of books (Transaction Books), journals (Transaction Periodicals Consortium), and eBooks.

In 1969, Transaction relocatedto the newly formed Livingston College, on the Livingston campus of Rutgers University in Piscataway, New Jersey. Many editors, authors, and advisors were drawn from the faculty. Close to 200 faculty members have been authors and editors of Transaction books.

AldineTransaction was an imprint of Transaction Publishers. Formerly a division of Walter de Gruyter, Inc., Aldine Publishing Co. was acquired by Transaction in July 2004, and the books were then published under the imprint AldineTransaction. AldineTransaction published classic books in the fields of sociology, anthropology, economics, sociobiology, physical anthropology, and public policy. It acquired book lists from Precedent Publishers in 2009 and the Rutgers Center for Urban Policy Research (CUPR) in 2011.

Transaction published more than 6,000 titles.

Transaction once published academic journals, including its flagship journal, Society; however, Transaction sold its journal publishing program to Springer Science+Business Media in 2007.

In 2010, Penn State University announced the "Irving Louis Horowitz–Transaction Publishers Archives, 1939–2009" open for public research at Penn State's Historical Collections and Labor Archives (HCLA) of The Eberly Family Special Collections Library, University Libraries. The archive documents the expansion of social-science research over the past half century.

== See also ==
- Books in the United States
- Journalism in the United States
- Lists of publishing companies
