= Rutgers Journal of Law & Public Policy =

- Discipline: Legal studies
- Language: English

Publication details
- Former names: Rutgers Journal of Law & Urban Policy
- History: 2004-present
- Publisher: Rutgers School of Law (United States)
- Frequency: Quarterly

Standard abbreviations
- ISO 4: Rutgers J. Law Public Policy

Indexing
- ISSN: 1934-3736 (print); 1934-3744 (web)
- LCCN: 2005216456
- OCLC no.: 74273223

Links
- Journal homepage

The Rutgers Journal of Law & Public Policy is a student-run legal journal at Rutgers School of Law. It covers the interaction of law and various areas of public policy. The journal was established in 2004 as the Rutgers Journal of Law & Urban Policy and obtained its current name in 2006.

== See also ==
- Edward J. Bloustein School of Planning and Public Policy
