= Karolina Zmarlak =

Polish-American fashion designer

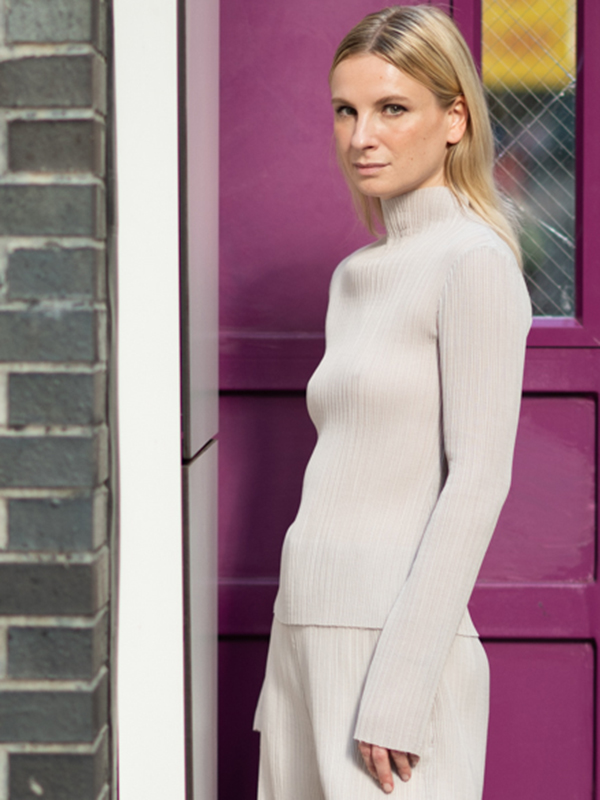
- Born: October 15, 1982 (age 43); Krosno, Poland
- Citizenship: Poland; United States
- Education: Fashion Institute of Technology
- Occupation: Fashion designer
- Labels: Karolina Zmarlak; KZ_K Studio
- Awards: Gen Art Styles Award for Eveningwear (2005)

Karolina Zmarlak (born October 15, 1982) is a Polish-American fashion designer. She is known for founding the fashion company KZ_K Studio.

== Early life and education ==
Zmarlak was born in Poland. She immigrated to Chicago in 1992 through the Diversity Visa (DV) program. She was inspired to become a clothing designer after taking her first sewing class in high school. Zmarlak attended the Fashion Institute of Technology in New York City. While in college, she was awarded the Gen Art Styles Award for evening wear in 2005.

== Career ==
Zmarlak began her career in the fashion industry by interning at the fashion brands Theory and Carolina Herrera. After graduating from college, she partnered with Jesse Keyes to launch her eponymous fashion label Karolina Zmarlak in 2009 which launched its first clothing collection, Fluid Foundations, through the stores Takashimaya and Eva. In 2011, she collaborated with Belvedere Vodka on the fashion film Double Identity. In 2013, Saks Fifth Avenue began carrying her clothing collections. In 2014, she became one of the first recipients of the New York City Fashion Production Fund because she produced her clothes in the Garment district.

In 2015, Zmarlak collaborated with costume designer Daniel Lawson to provide costumes for the TV series The Good Wife. In 2015, her Fall ready-to-wear collection was featured in Vogue. In Spring 2015, she also showcased her clothing designs in the fashion film Transience at Video Fashion Week. In September 2015, Zmarlak spoke at an event promoting the development of New York’s fashion industry alongside other speakers such as U.S. Representative Carolyn B. Maloney. In 2016, Zmarlak and Keyes founded a new fashion label, KZ_K Studio. In 2018, Zmarlak served as a critic at the Fashion Institute of Technology's annual fashion show.

In 2022, Zmarlak and Keyes opened a new KZ_K Studio location on Great Jones Street in Manhattan. The Great Jones Street studio officially launched on April 12, 2022.

== See also ==
- Jesse Keyes
