= 1975 San Francisco mayoral election =

- November 4, 1975; December 9, 1975
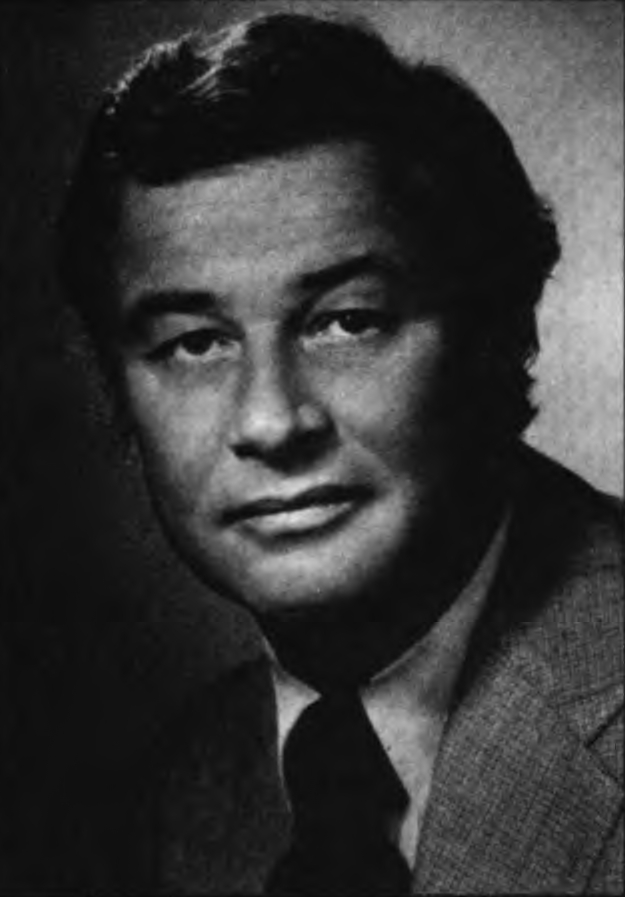

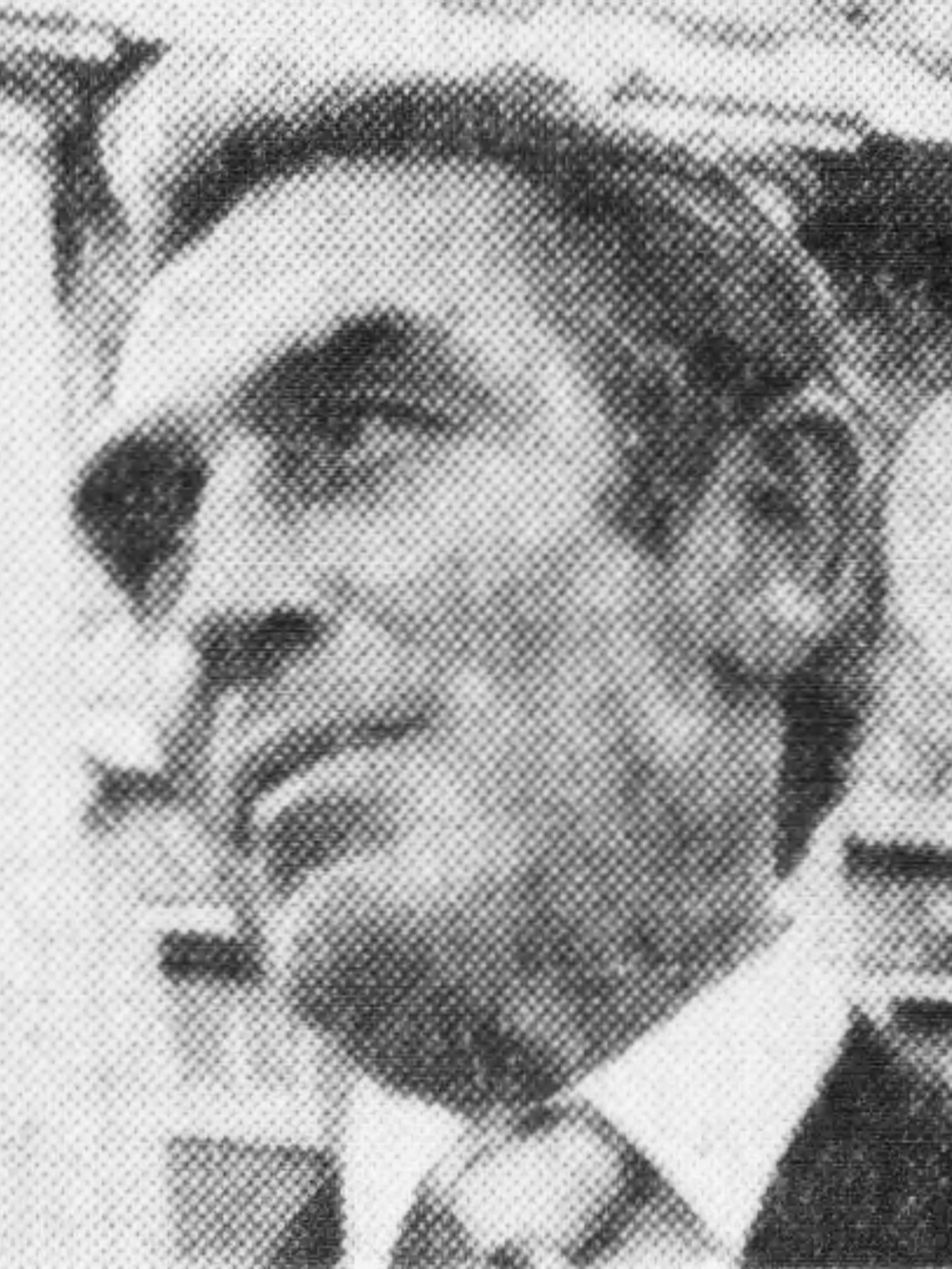

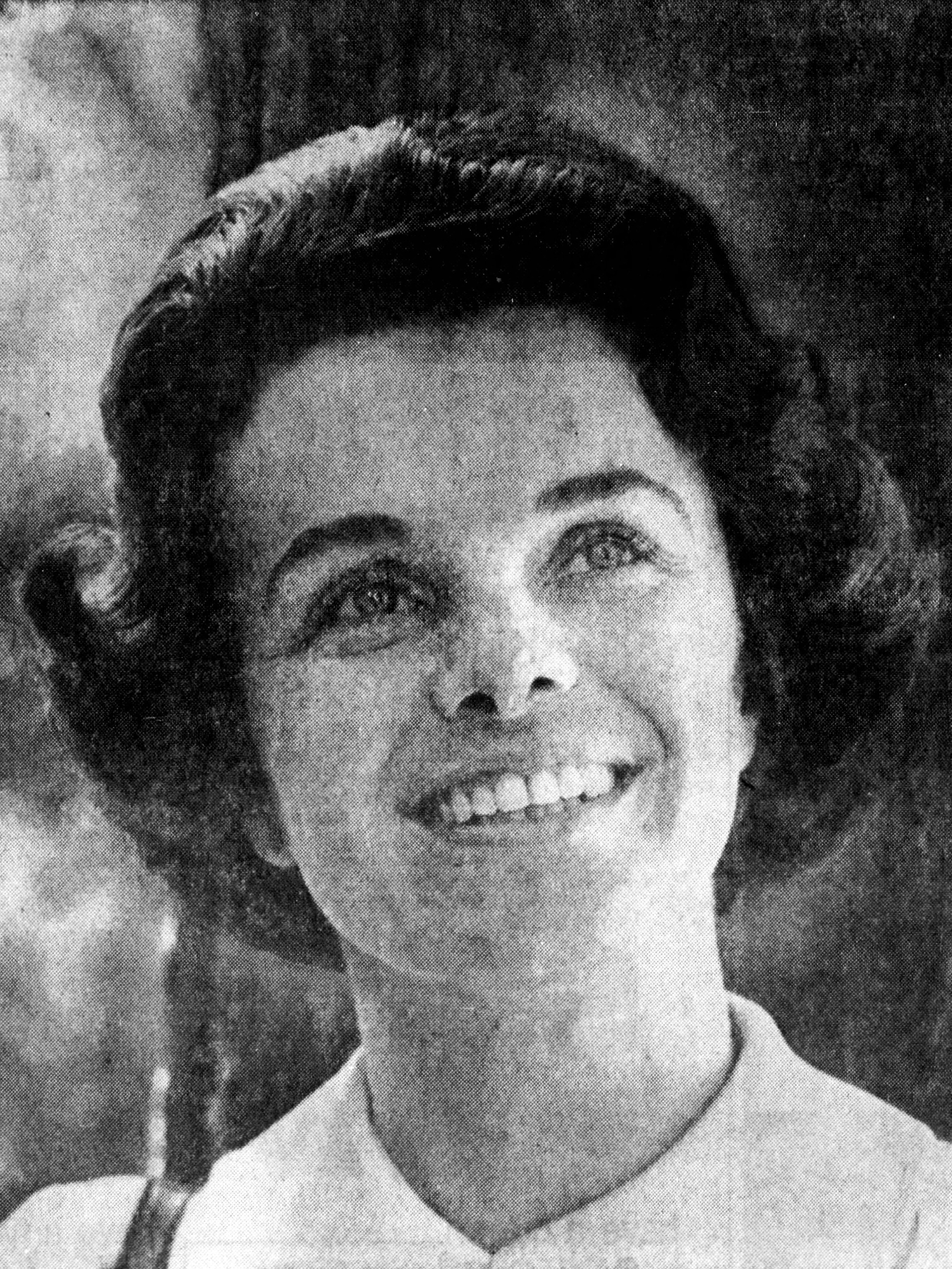

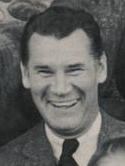

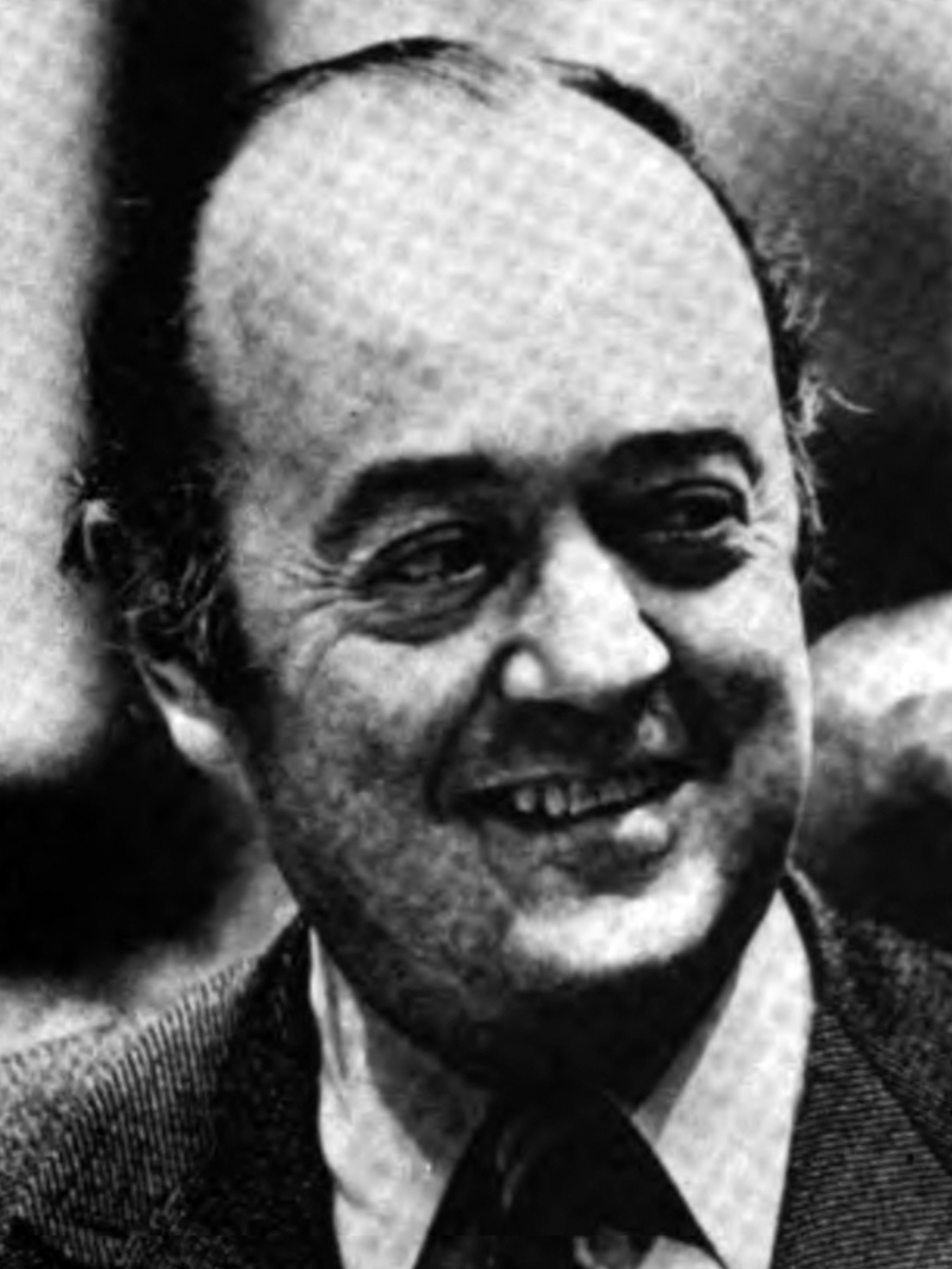
| Candidate | George Moscone | John J. Barbagelata | Dianne Feinstein |
| Party | Democratic | Republican | Democratic |
| First-round vote | 66,195 | 40,540 | 39,344 |
| First-round percentage | 31.52% | 19.31% | 18.74% |
| Second-round vote | 101,528 | 97,213 |
| Second-round percentage | 51.09% | 48.91% |
| Candidate | John A. Ertola | Milton Marks |
| Party | Nonpartisan | Republican |
| First-round vote | 30,360 | 27,910 |
| First-round percentage | 14.46% | 13.29% |
Mayor before election
Joseph Alioto
Democratic
Elected mayor
George Moscone
Democratic

The 1975 mayoral election was held to select the 37th mayor of San Francisco, and was held in two parts. In the November regular election, then-Speaker of the California State Assembly George Moscone placed first with conservative city supervisor John Barbagelata second and moderate supervisor Dianne Feinstein coming in third. Moscone and Barbagelata thus both advanced to the mandated runoff election in December where Moscone narrowly defeated the conservative supervisor by 4,400 votes, a margin of less than 1%.

For the rest of his life, Barbagelata maintained that the People's Temple religious cult, led by Jim Jones, committed election fraud by bussing in out-of-town church members to double and triple vote for Moscone under the registrations of dead voters.

== Proposition B ==
With Moscone in office there was a move to redefine how the city's governing Board of Supervisors should be selected as well as paid. Neighborhood activists at that time sought to reduce the influence of downtown businesses and thus the method for selecting supervisors. Their aim was to create a new system of neighborhood-based supervisors. Many of the existing supervisors did not even live in the city itself. The activists founded the SFDE (San Franciscans for District Elections) and managed to get placed the initiative - so-called Proposition T - on a local ballot in November 1976. The ballot was successful but a group of existing supervisors, including Barbagelata, then met to plan a repeal election. However, Barbagelata then took the repeal further by getting put forward a more radical ballot, Proposition B, which called for the recalling of the mayor [Moscone] and a number of other high elected officials in the city. The scheme was referred to as the "fire everybody petition". According to Chester Hartman, in his 1984 book City for Sale: The Transformation of San Francisco, many viewed the measure as Barbagelata's attempt to get back at Moscone, who, he felt had "stolen" the 1975 mayoral election from him. In Moscone's own words: "There's only one goal in his [Barbagelata's] mind and that's to dump me. I just know that his plan has nothing to do with reform, and if John [Barbagelata] tries to sell that to anybody it's a loser." On August 2, 1977, Barbagelata's Proposition B lost 64% to 36%.

== Results ==
=== First round ===
San Francisco mayoral election, 1975 (first round) November 4, 1975
| Party | Candidate | Votes | % |
|---|---|---|---|
| Democratic | George Moscone | 66,195 | 31.52 |
| Republican | John J. Barbagelata | 40,540 | 19.31 |
| Democratic | Dianne Feinstein | 39,344 | 18.74 |
| Nonpartisan | John A. Ertola | 30,360 | 14.46 |
| Republican | Milton Marks | 27,910 | 13.29 |
| Nonpartisan | John C. Diamante | 2,218 | 1.06 |
| Nonpartisan | Roland Sheppard | 1,080 | 0.51 |
| Nonpartisan | Ray Cunningham | 1,061 | 0.51 |
| Nonpartisan | Josie-Lee Kuhlman | 477 | 0.23 |
| Nonpartisan | Donald Donaldson | 433 | 0.21 |
| Nonpartisan | Nicholas F. Benton | 362 | 0.17 |

=== Runoff ===
San Francisco mayoral election, 1975 (runoff) December 9, 1975
| Party | Candidate | Votes | % |
|---|---|---|---|
| Democratic | George Moscone | 101,528 | 51.09 |
| Republican | John J. Barbagelata | 97,213 | 48.91 |
