= Children's Creativity Museum =

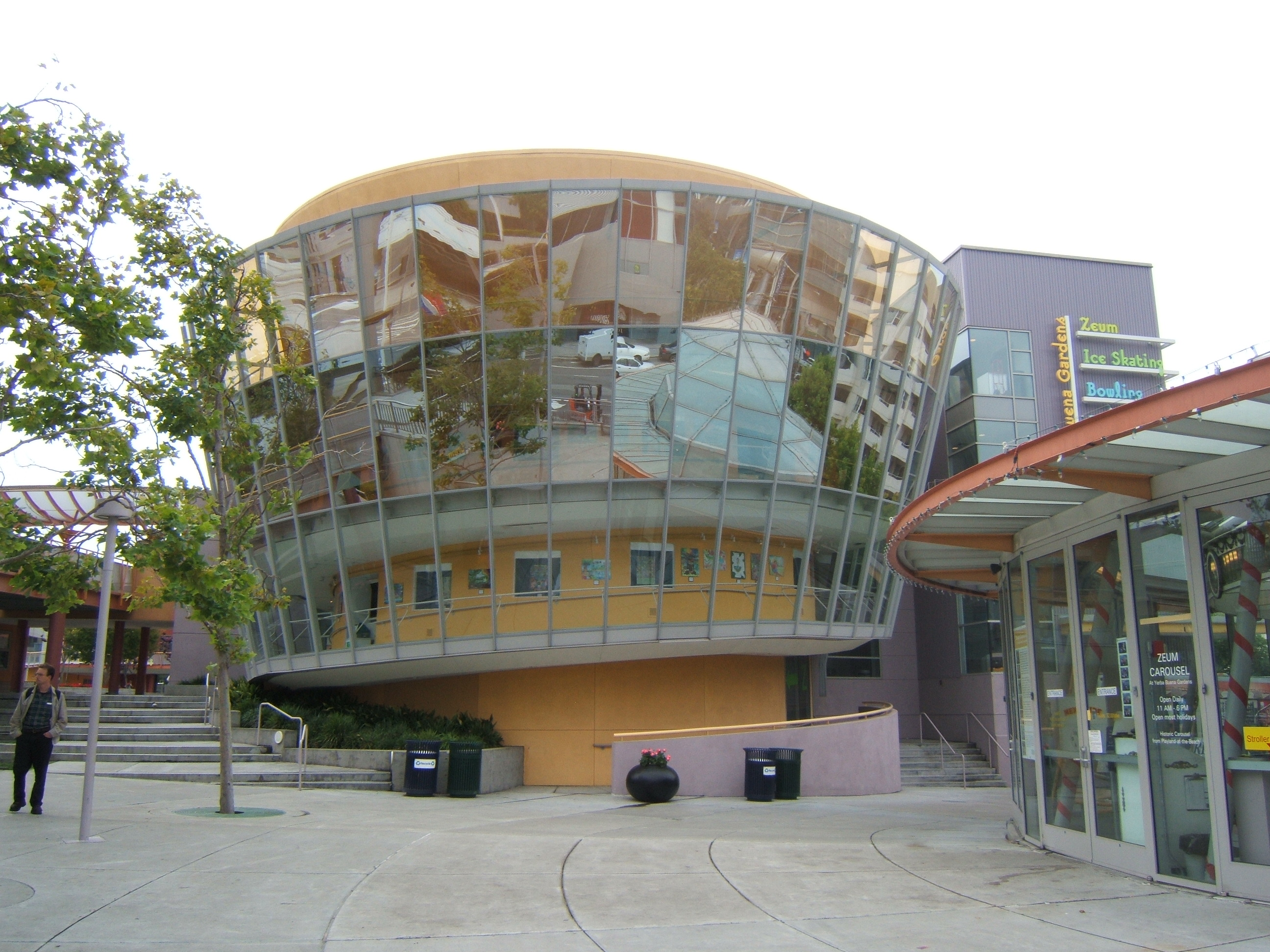
- Children's Creativity Museum
- Former name: Zeum
- Established: 31 October 1998
- Location: Yerba Buena Gardens, San Francisco, California
- Coordinates: 37.783273°N 122.401827°W
- Type: Children's museum
- Website: creativity.org

The Children's Creativity Museum is an interactive museum for children aged 2–12 years, located in Yerba Buena Gardens, in San Francisco, California. It offers workshops and exhibits that allow children to produce their own media through various interactive, creative processes: stop motion animation, programming robots, music video production, design challenges, art projects, and more. It has around 100,000 museum visitors annually (as of 2016/17). The Children's Creativity Museum is a nonprofit 501(c)(3) organization, with annual revenues of around $2.1 million (as of 2016/17), including $600,000 of funding from the city of San Francisco.

== History ==
The Children's Creativity Museum opened as Zeum on October 31, 1998, as part of a major 87-acre (350,000 m^{2}) urban renewal project in the South of Market area by the San Francisco Redevelopment Agency. It is housed in a two-story building, constructed on top of the Moscone Convention Center, which includes a 200-seat theatre and 3,000 square feet of exhibition space. The museum includes a 1906 carousel by Charles I. D. Looff.

Zeum changed its name to Children's Creativity Museum in 2011 to increase awareness about the museum's purpose. In a press release announcing the name change, it stated: "Although the name Zeum sounded fun, it didn't provide parents with any clues about what they and their children would experience. With that understanding, our verbal branding team identified two primary goals the new name needed to accomplish: It had to be descriptive enough to indicate who it was for, but also suggestive enough to encompass the broad range of imaginative activities participants could take part in. After vetting over 200 names with Zeum leadership, it was agreed that the name "Children's Creativity Museum" accomplished both goals."

== Programming ==
Educational programming focuses on the “Imagine-Create-Share” creativity cycle that promotes engagement and collaboration through playful learning.
