= Edward J. Bloustein School of Planning and Public Policy =

Public policy school of Rutgers University

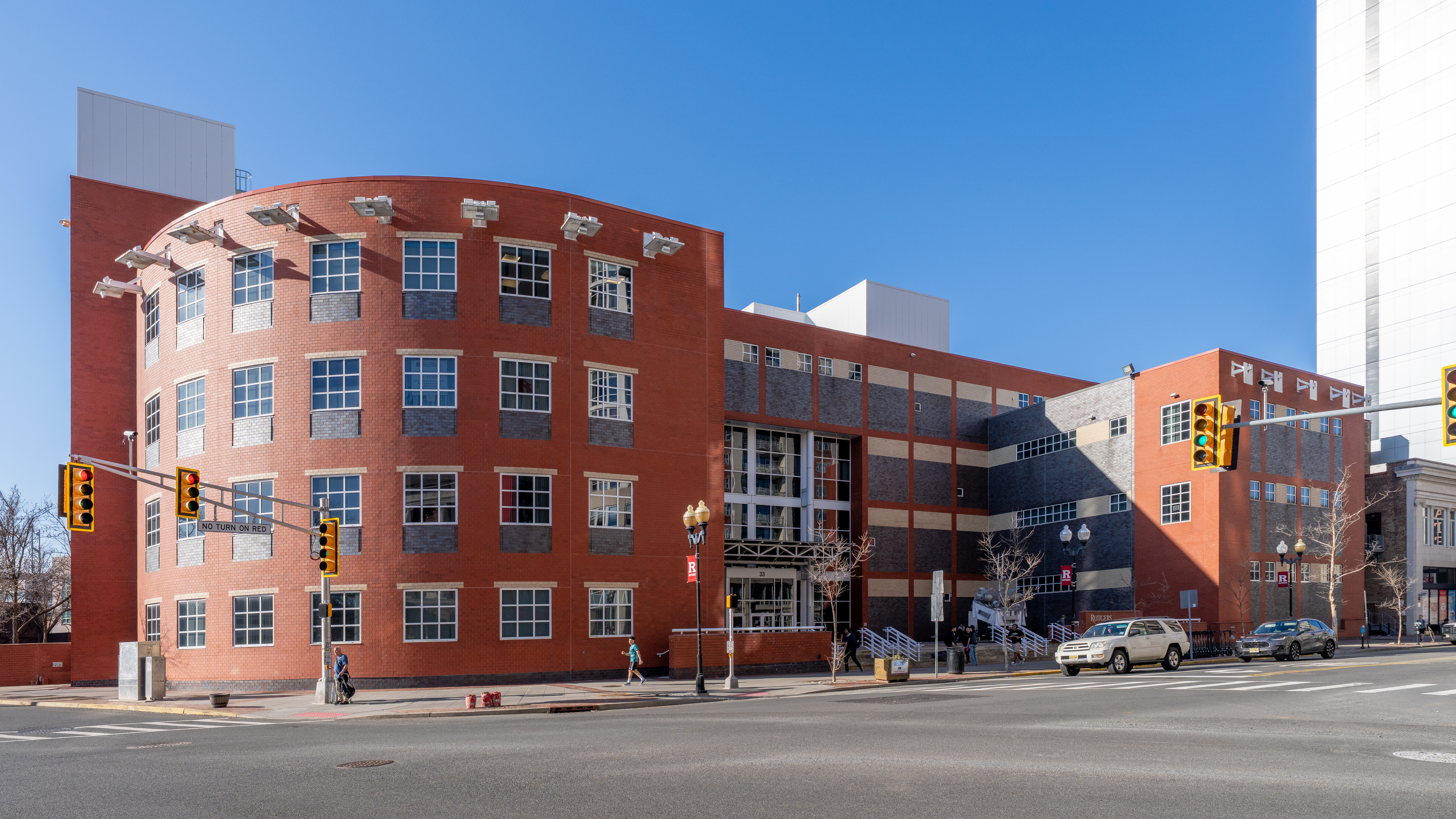
- The Civic Square Building
- Type: Public
- Established: 1992
- Parent institution: Rutgers
- Affiliations: Planning Accreditation Board (1987–present); Network of Schools of Public Policy, Affairs, and Administration (2011–present); Council on Education for Public Health (2016–present)
- Dean: Stuart Shapiro
- Academic staff: 52
- Administrative staff: 103
- Undergraduates: 900
- Postgraduates: 378
- Location: New Brunswick, New Jersey, United States; 40.493704°N 74.443457°W
- Colors: Scarlet

The Edward J. Bloustein School of Planning and Public Policy of Rutgers University (The Bloustein School) serves as a center for the theory and practice of urban planning, public policy and public health/health administration scholarship. The school is located in New Brunswick, New Jersey, and was named in honor of the former Rutgers University president, Edward J. Bloustein (1971 to 1989). Through its academic programs and research centers, the Bloustein School engages in instruction and research, combined learning and application (for example, it holds "studios" in which students practice engaged scholarship by working with community stakeholders on urban planning and policy issues in communities throughout the United States). The school's strengths and the specializations of its faculty are vast and many of its faculty members are the founders of theories or practices that are now commonplace in urban planning and policy. Areas of expertise for Bloustein faculty members include transportation planning and the environment, urban and community health, workforce development, and social justice.

The school offers undergraduate degree programs in health administration, planning and public policy, public health, public policy, and urban planning and design; master's programs in urban planning, public policy, health administration, and public informatics; and a Ph.D. program in urban planning and policy development. Joint and dual degree master's programs in law, business administration, infrastructure planning, food and business economics, and public health are also offered. The school does not currently offer any degrees online.

The school's planning program is accredited by the Planning Accreditation Board, its graduate policy program is accredited by the Network of Schools of Public Policy, Affairs, and Administration, the Masters in Health Administration is accredited by the Commission on Accreditation of Health Care Management Education and the undergraduate public health program is accredited by the Council on Education for Public Health.

== History ==
The Bloustein School's public policy program has its origins in the political science department of the Rutgers New Brunswick campus. In 1956, the department offered a professionally oriented master of arts degree in political science with a focus on politics and public policy. The curriculum was significantly reformed between 1978 and 1980 with an emphasis on public policy analytics and quantitative methods for policy research.

The Department of Urban Planning and Policy Development was created in 1967. Early faculty members recollect that the department's mission was forged in the tempestuous cauldron of the late 1960s’ urban unrest and the desire to address, through research and service, the inequalities underlying it. The Ph.D. degree in urban planning was inaugurated at Rutgers in 1968, and the first doctoral degrees were awarded within three years of the program's founding in 1971. In 1978, the name of the doctoral program was changed to the PhD in Urban Planning and Policy Development, reflecting the programmatic emphasis on policy and politics that has characterized urban planning at Rutgers since its inception.

The founding of the Bloustein School occurred in 1992 and was named after Edward J. Bloustein, the seventeenth president of Rutgers, The State University of New Jersey. During the 1992–1993 academic year, the Department of Public Policy faculty developed and received approval for the establishment of a two-year master of public policy degree at the Bloustein School. From 1995 until the present, the school has been based out of the Civic Square Building in downtown New Brunswick. The Civic Square Building puts students in the heart of their community adjacent to government administrators and services. Its location is also centrally located among the three Rutgers campuses in New Brunswick and at the center of the downtown economy.

The undergraduate major in Health Administration was created in 2015. In January 2017, the Bloustein School enrolled its first cohort of graduate students in the executive master of health administration program. The two-year, cohort-based program is designed for the health professional with five or more years of experience in the field. The traditional master of health program began enrolling students in the fall of 2017, and is designed for students who have completed a bachelor's degree, have less than five years of experience in the healthcare industry, or are seeking to make a career change and complete the program at their own pace on a full- or part-time basis.

The Master of Public Informatics program was created in 2019 to provide a vehicle for educating students in the competencies needed in the field of big data: context, statistics, programming, data management, data analytics, visualization, spatial analysis, applications and the integration of these skills. The school's curriculum has always required intensive study of data analysis and multivariate methods, and as students mastered these skills, more challenging applications of data analysis and interpretation have been added. Applications of the program include all of the school's major areas of study, including the realms of transportation, environmental management, urban design, mobility, social policy, public management and operations, public health, health administration, and community engagement and empowerment.

== Admissions and financial aid ==
Admission to the Bloustein School is competitive. Prospective students are individuals who have graduated from approved institutions and who show evidence of potential for successful completion of a graduate program. Qualified students may be eligible for need- or merit-based financial aid. The Bloustein School also offers research and practicum opportunities through the wide variety of centers and institutes housed within the school.

The Bloustein School is a veteran-friendly institution with both faculty and staff who are themselves veterans of the Armed Forces. Rutgers is also a member of the Yellow Ribbon Program which assists veterans by making additional funds available to cover the cost of education without an additional charge for GI Bill entitlements. In 2019 Rutgers ranked third in the Military Times list of Best Schools for Military Students. It was also the largest university in the top ten rankings.

== Academics ==
=== Degree programs ===
The Bloustein School educates a select pool of students, preparing them for both public and private sector careers, teaching and research professions, and service at all levels of government. Undergraduate students admitted to the Bloustein School enter one of five undergraduate majors, but are allowed to pursue joint degrees (double majors). Undergraduate degrees are available in:

- BS-Health Administration
- BA-Planning and Policy
- BS-Public Health
- BS-Public Policy
- BS-Urban Planning and Design

Undergraduate students who take a specified selection of courses may earn a minor in any of the programs above. Two additional minors available to undergraduate students include:

- Public Administration
- Urban Studies

Graduate Students admitted to the Bloustein School are accepted into one of four to six degrees or a Doctor of Philosophy (PhD) in Planning and Public Policy. PhDs are conferred through the Graduate School-New Brunswick as it is an advanced scholarly degree appropriate for students seeking a career in university teaching and research or a leadership position in planning and public policy in the public, private, or non-profit sector. The majority of graduate students are enrolled in one of three graduate programs: the Master in Public Policy, the Master of City and Regional Planning, and the Master of Health Administration. The full list of graduate degrees includes:

- Master of Public Policy
- Master of City and Regional Planning
- Master of Health Administration
- Master of Public Informatics
- Master of Public Affairs and Politics
- Master of City and Regional Studies
- Executive Master of Health Administration
- Doctor of Philosophy (PhD) in Planning and Public Policy

Bloustein Students may also take a limited number of courses at Princeton University and New Jersey Institute of Technology as the school has reciprocal arrangements with both schools.

=== Research Centers ===
The school is host to several research centers and collaborative programs, established by the University's Board of Governors. These specialized centers carry out large-scale projects and are supported by external funding. Many of these centers offer continuing education and training programs for government officials, nonprofit leaders, and career professionals.

There are currently five centers. They are the Voorhees Transportation Center, The Heldrich Center for Workforce Development, The Center for Urban Policy Research, the Bloustein Center for Survey Research and the Voorhees Center for Civic Engagement. The school is also home to the New Jersey State Policy Lab and the Rutgers Urban and Civic Informatics Lab.

== Notable current and former faculty ==
- James J. Florio

== See also ==
- Center for Urban Policy Research
- Rutgers Journal of Law & Public Policy
