= John Barbagelata =

American politician

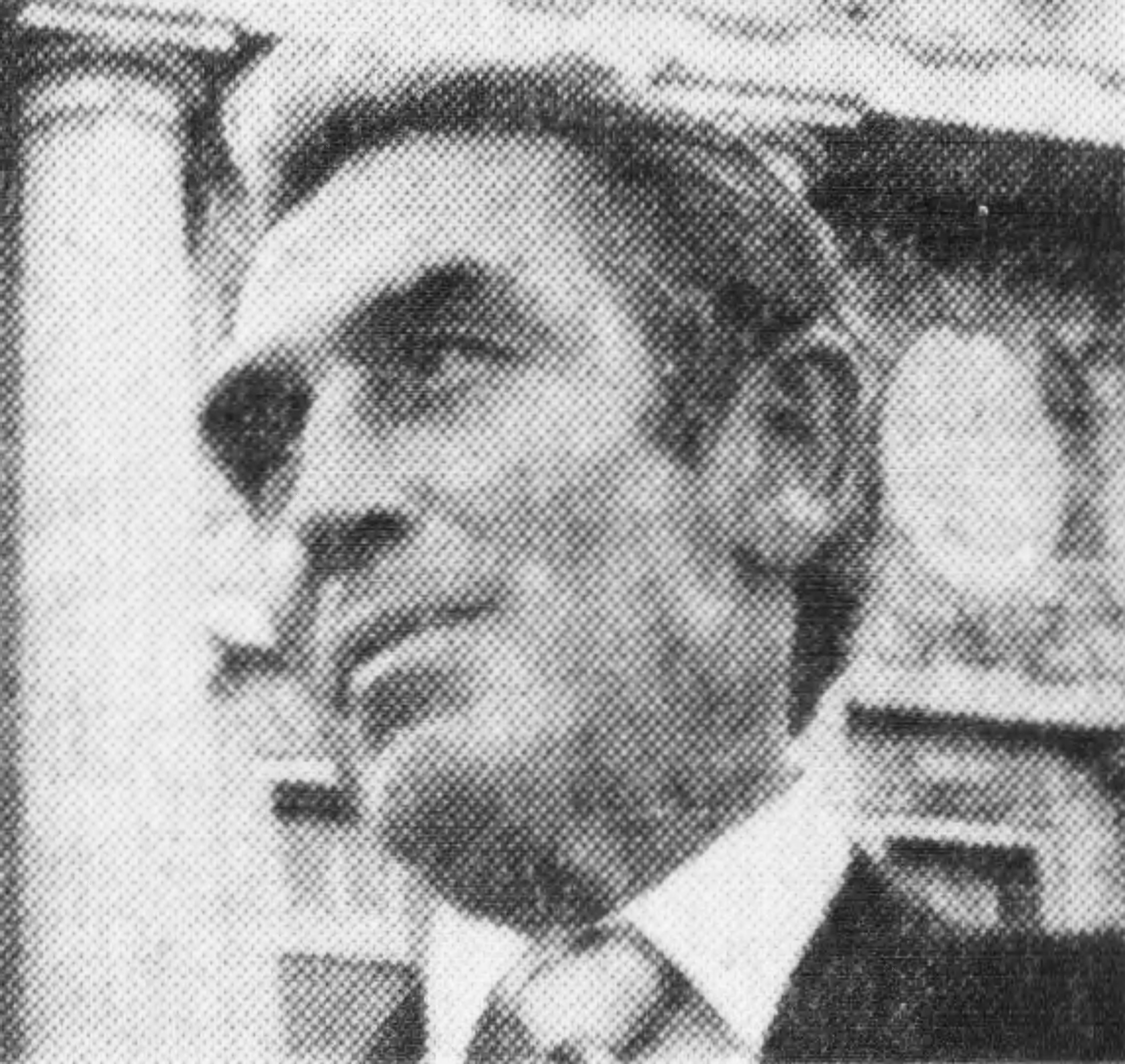
Barbagelata in 1975

John Barbagelata (March 29, 1919 – March 19, 1994) was a San Francisco City Supervisor and 1975 mayoral candidate, when he narrowly lost to George Moscone. He was also the owner of a local real estate firm. As of 2020, he was the last Republican to be elected to the San Francisco Board of Supervisors, in 1973.

== Personal life ==
John Barbagelata was born in San Francisco in 1919. At the age of 13 his family home in the Marina district was relocated to make way for the highway to the Golden Gate Bridge. He was employed by Pan Am Airlines and was responsible for their expansion into Japan and China after WWII. He was a realtor and the founder of the Barbagelata Realty Company, which is still operating in San Francisco's West Portal neighborhood. He had eight children and was a devout Catholic.

== Political career ==
A Catholic businessman, Barbagelata advocated for pro-business policies such as lower taxes and minimal government regulation of business. He fought corruption of labor unions, was targeted by leftist groups such as the SLA (Symbionese Liberation Army) and the lesser known NWLF (New World Liberation Front). These terrorist organizations were responsible for assassination attempts against Barbagelata and his family, one such attempt was a bomb concealed in a See's candy box. Some of his political achievements include the de-escalation of the Native Americans occupation of Alcatraz Island, the support of the "Street Artist Movement" and working with the board of supervisors to balance the budget. During his time in office Barbagelata voted in favor of:

- Resolution asking the section which made homosexuality criminal behavior be deleted from the penal Code Revision.
- Resolution asking that a gay commissioner be appointed to the Human Rights Commission, Ordinance creating a three person Gay Advisory Committee for the Human Rights Commission.
- AB 489 (Consensual Act Bill)
- AB 633 (Adding Sexual Orientation to the Fair Employment Practice Act)
- He met with Huey Newton the leader of the Black Panthers to understand what his followers were asking for.
- Barbagelata was first elected to the Board of Supervisors in 1970 on a campaign of fiscal responsibility and lower taxes.

Barbagelata ran for mayor in 1975 against progressive candidate George Moscone, promising low taxes, a crackdown on crime, and a fight against corruption and "irresponsible City spending". He lost by fewer than 5,000 votes. For the rest of his life, Barbagelata maintained that the Peoples Temple far-left religious cult, led by Jim Jones, committed election fraud in the 1975 election by busing in out-of-town church members to double- and triple-vote for Moscone under the names of dead voters.

He retired from politics in 1978, returning briefly in the late 1980s to promote a successful referendum creating term limits for City Supervisors.
