= George Moscone =

Mayor of San Francisco from 1976 to 1978

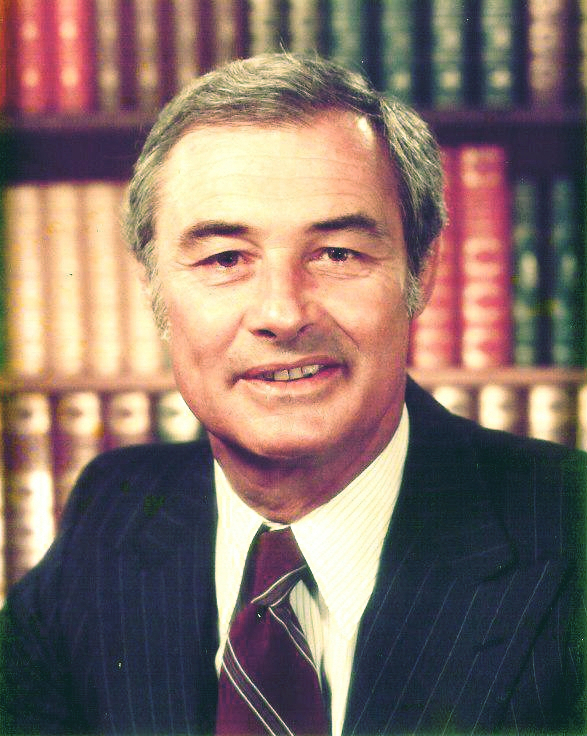
- Official portrait c. 1975

37th Mayor of San Francisco
- In office January 8, 1976 – November 27, 1978
- Preceded by: Joseph Alioto
- Succeeded by: Dianne Feinstein

Member of the California Senate
- In office January 2, 1967 – January 8, 1976
- Preceded by: Harold Thomas Sedgwick
- Succeeded by: John Francis Foran
- Constituency: 10th district (1967–1971); 6th district (1971–1976)

Member of the San Francisco Board of Supervisors from the at-large district
- In office January 8, 1964 – January 2, 1967
- Preceded by: J. Max Moore
- Succeeded by: Josiah H. Beeman V

Personal details
- Born: George Richard Moscone; November 24, 1929 San Francisco, California, U.S.
- Died: November 27, 1978 (aged 49) San Francisco, California, U.S.
- Cause of death: Assassination by gunshot
- Resting place: Holy Cross Cemetery
- Party: Democratic
- Children: 4, including Jonathan
- Education: University of the Pacific (BA); University of California, Hastings (LLB)

Military service
- Allegiance: United States
- Branch/service: United States Navy
- Years of service: 1953–1956
- Battles/wars: Korean War

George Richard Moscone (/məˈskoʊni/ mə-SKOH-nee; November 24, 1929 – November 27, 1978) was an American attorney and politician who served as the 37th mayor of San Francisco from January 1976 until his assassination in November 1978.

He was known as "The People's Mayor", who opened up City Hall and its commissions to reflect the diversity of San Francisco, appointing African Americans, Asian Americans, and gay people. A member of the Democratic Party, Moscone served in the California State Senate from 1967 until becoming mayor; in the Senate he served as majority leader. He is remembered for being an advocate of civil progressivism.

== Early life ==
George Richard Moscone was born in the Italian American enclave of San Francisco's Marina District. The Moscone family comes from Piedmont and Liguria. His father was George Joseph Moscone, a corrections officer at nearby San Quentin, and his mother, Lena, was a homemaker who later went to work to support herself and her son after she separated from her husband.

Moscone attended St. Brigid's and then St. Ignatius College Preparatory, where he was a noted debater and an all-city basketball star. He then attended College of the Pacific on a basketball scholarship and played basketball for the Tigers. He received a Bachelor of Arts in sociology in 1953.

Moscone then studied at University of California, Hastings College of the Law, where he received his law degree. He married Gina Bondanza, whom he had known since she was in grade school, in 1954. The Moscones would go on to have four children. After serving in the United States Navy, Moscone started private practice in 1956.

== Career ==
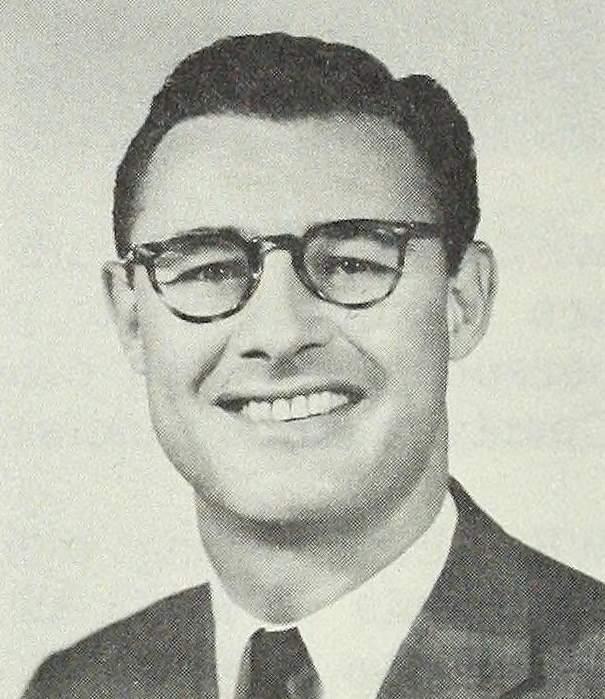
Moscone c. 1965

As a young man playing basketball and as a young lawyer, Moscone became close friends with John Burton, who would later become a member of the U.S. House of Representatives. John's older brother, Phillip, a member of the California State Assembly, recruited Moscone to run for an Assembly seat in 1960 as a Democrat. Though he lost that race, Moscone would go on to win a seat on the San Francisco Board of Supervisors in 1963. On the Board, Moscone was known for his defense of poor people, racial minorities and small business owners, as well as supporting the first successful fight in San Francisco to block construction of a proposed freeway that would have cut through Golden Gate Park and several neighborhoods.

=== California State Senator ===
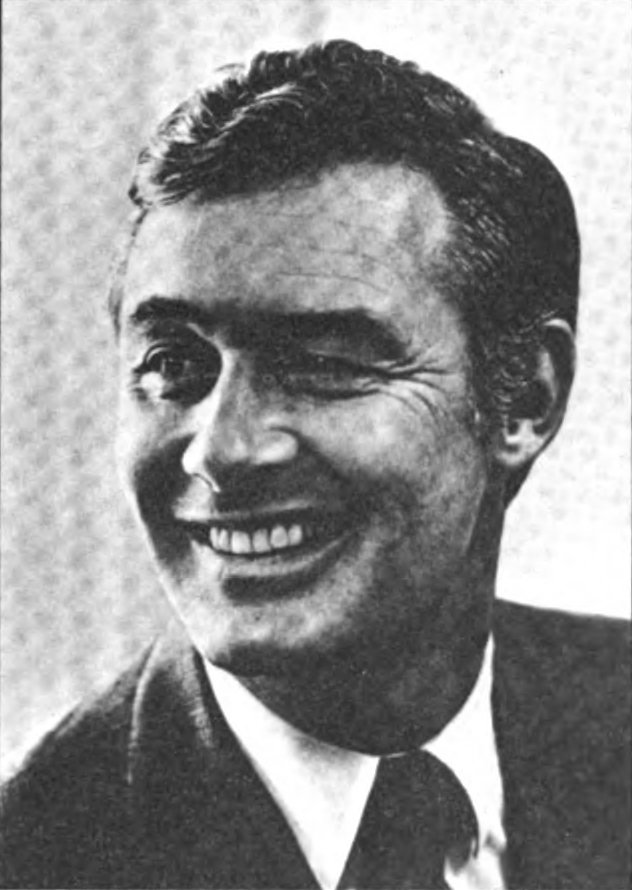
Moscone in 1971 while serving in the State Senate

In 1966 Moscone ran for and won a seat in the California State Senate, representing the 10th District in San Francisco County. Moscone was quickly rising through the ranks of the California Democratic Party and became closely associated with a loose alliance of progressive politicians in San Francisco led by the Burton brothers. This alliance was known as the Burton Machine and included John Burton, Phillip Burton, and Assemblyman Willie Brown. Soon after his election to the State Senate, Moscone was elected by his party to serve as Majority Leader. He was reelected to the 10th District seat in 1970 and to the newly redistricted 6th District seat, representing parts of San Francisco and San Mateo Counties, in 1974. He successfully sponsored legislation to institute a school lunch program for California students, as well as a bill legalizing abortion that was signed into law by Governor Ronald Reagan. In 1974 Moscone briefly considered a run for governor of California, but dropped out after a short time in favor of California Secretary of State Jerry Brown.

Moscone also was an early proponent of gay rights. In conjunction with his friend and ally in the Assembly, Willie Brown, Moscone managed to pass a bill repealing California's sodomy law. The repeal was signed into law by California Governor Jerry Brown.

=== Mayor of San Francisco ===
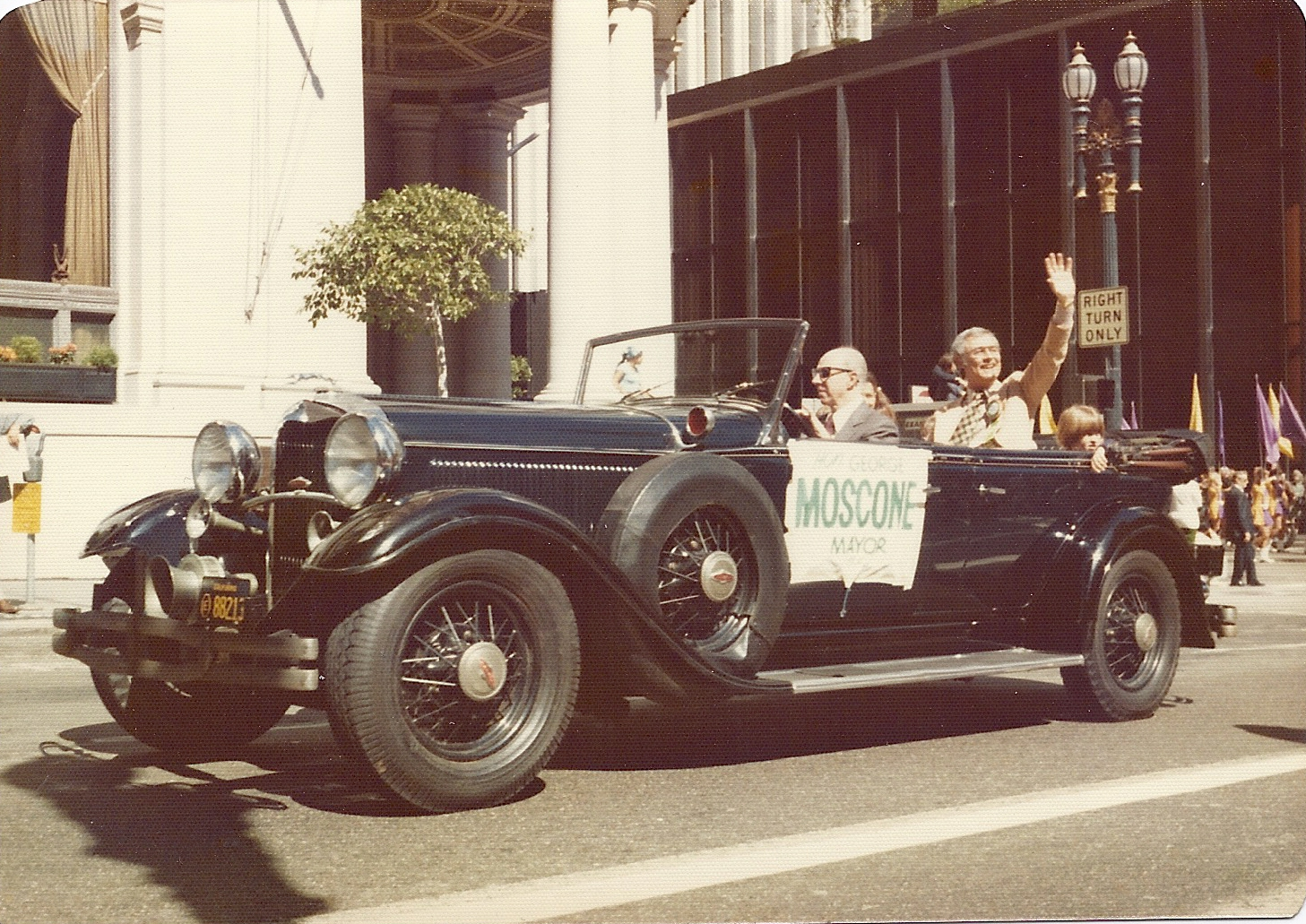
Moscone waves to watchers along Market Street during a Columbus Day parade c. 1976–1978

On December 19, 1974, Moscone announced he would run for mayor of San Francisco in the 1975 election. In a close race in November 1975, Moscone placed first, with conservative city supervisor John Barbagelata second and supervisor Dianne Feinstein coming in third. Moscone and Barbagelata thus both advanced to the mandated runoff election in December where Moscone narrowly defeated the conservative supervisor by fewer than 5,000 votes. Liberals also won the city's other top executive offices that year as Joseph Freitas was elected district attorney and Richard Hongisto was re-elected to his office of sheriff.

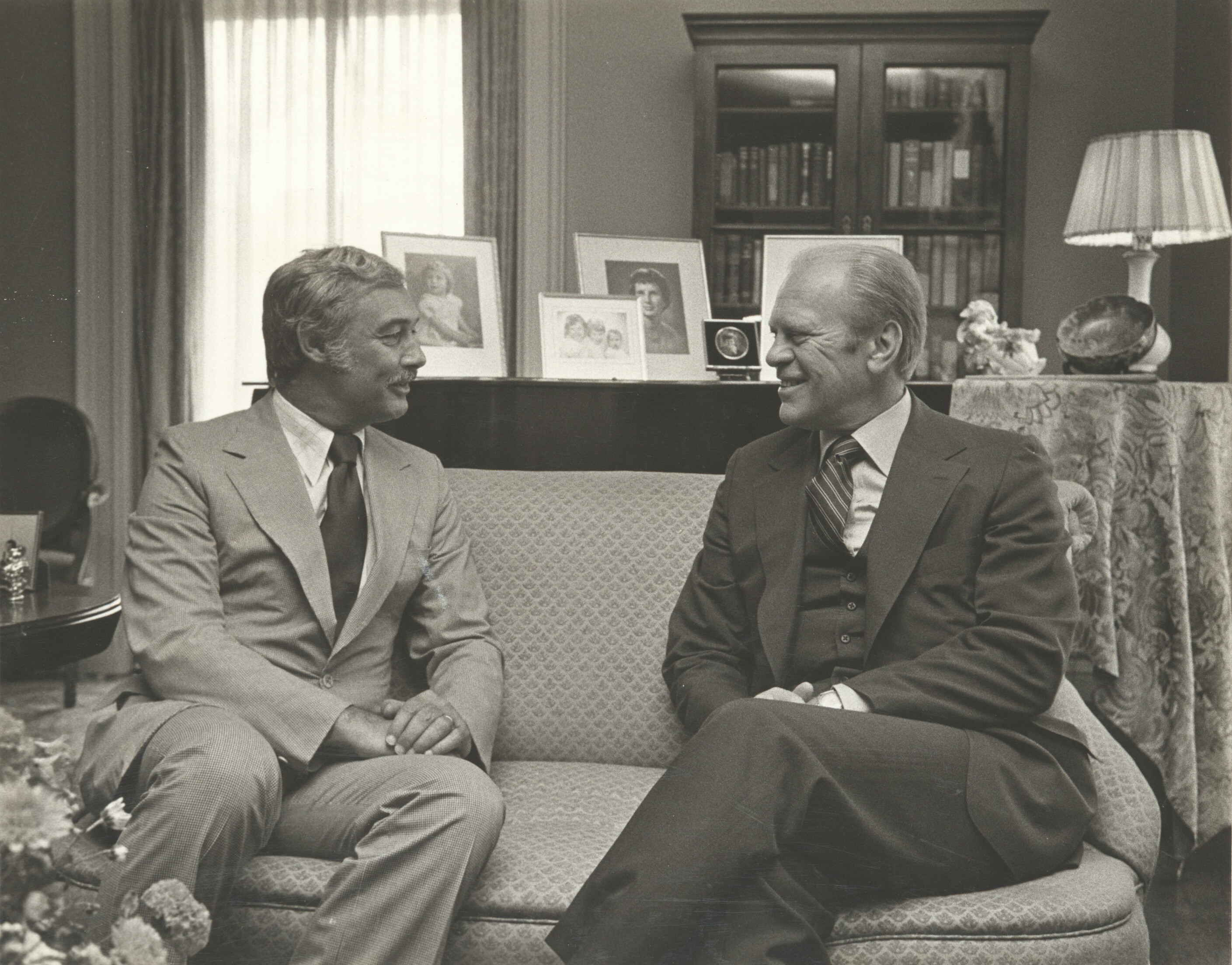
Moscone (left) meets with President Gerald Ford, October 6, 1976

Moscone ran a grassroots mayoral campaign which drew volunteers from organizations like Glide Methodist Memorial Church, Delancey Street (a rehabilitation center for ex-convicts) and the Peoples Temple which was initially known as a church preaching racial equality and social justice but turned into a fanatical political cult. For the rest of his life, Barbagelata maintained that the Peoples Temple had committed massive election fraud on behalf of Moscone by busing people in from out of town to vote multiple times under the names of deceased San Francisco residents.

Moscone passed legislation reducing marijuana sentences, granting abortion rights, establishing a school meals program and overturning the state's anti-sodomy laws.

The Peoples Temple also worked to get out the vote in precincts where Moscone received a 12-to-1 vote margin over Barbagelata. After the Peoples Temple's work and votes by Temple members were instrumental in delivering a close victory for Moscone, Moscone appointed Temple leader Jim Jones as chairman of the San Francisco Housing Commission.

Moscone's first year as mayor was spent preventing the San Francisco Giants professional baseball team from moving to Toronto and advocating a citywide ballot initiative in favor of district election to the board of supervisors. Moscone was the first mayor to appoint large numbers of women, homosexuals and racial minorities to city commissions and advisory boards. In 1977, he appointed Del Martin, the first lesbian woman, and Kathleen Hardiman Arnold, now Kathleen Rand Reed, the first Black woman, as commissioners on the San Francisco Commission on the Status of Women (SFCOSW). Moscone also appointed liberal Oakland Police Chief Charles Gain to head the San Francisco Police Department. Gain (and by extension Moscone) became highly unpopular among rank and file San Francisco police officers for proposing a settlement to a lawsuit brought by minorities claiming discriminatory recruiting practices by the police force.

In April 1977, Moscone stood up to officials in Washington by supporting a 25-day occupation of San Francisco's federal building by a group of over 100 people with disabilities demanding their civil rights in what would become known as the 504 Sit-in. While federal officials hoped to starve out the protesters, the mayor visited them and arranged to have portable showers and towels brought in. Thanks in part to Moscone's support, the occupation was successful, and helped pave the way for passing the Americans with Disabilities Act (ADA) thirteen years later.

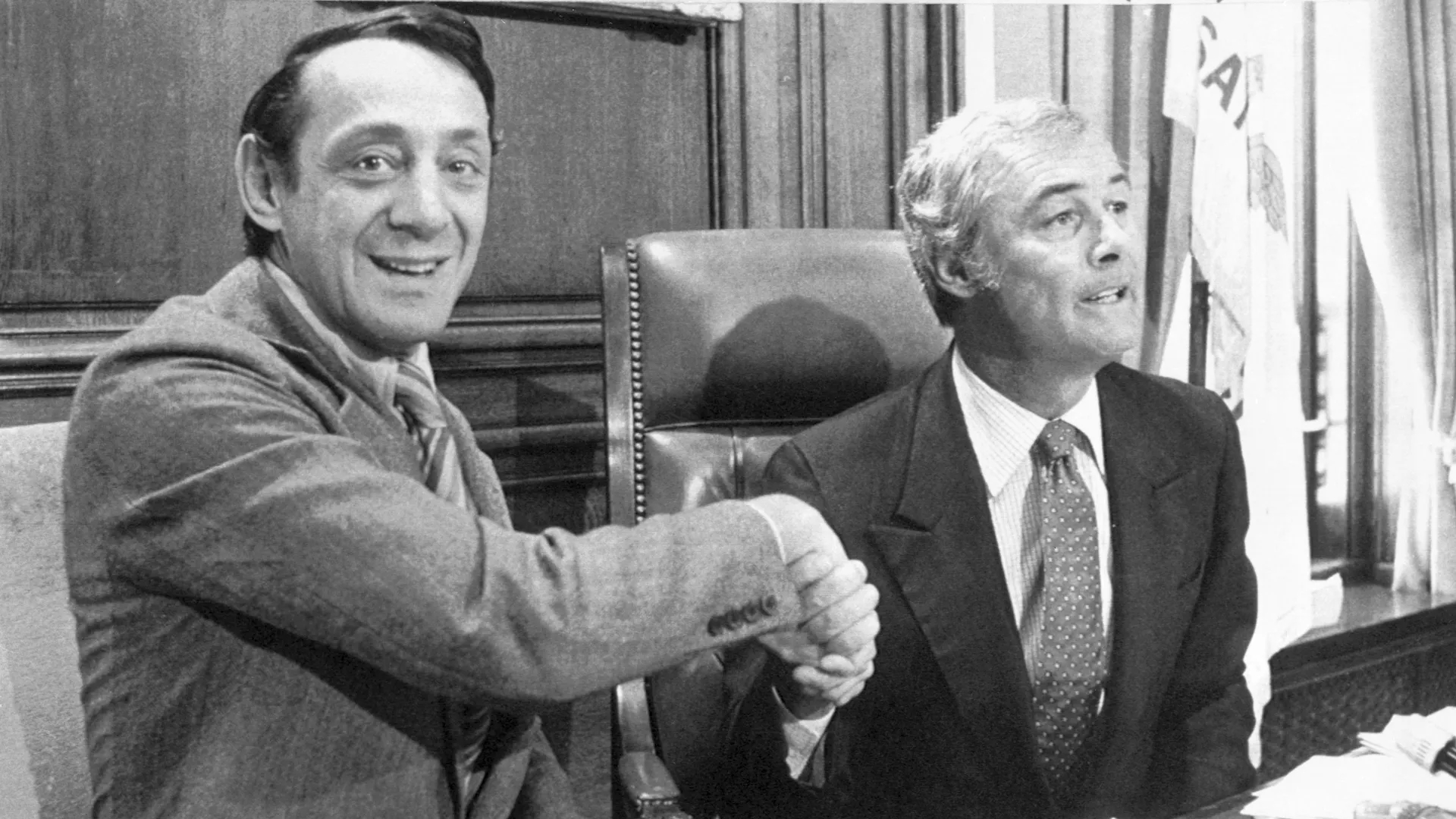
Moscone shakes hands with Supervisor Harvey Milk, April 11, 1978

In 1977, Moscone, Freitas, and Hongisto all easily survived a recall election pushed by defeated Moscone opponent John Barbagelata along with business interests. It was a political vindication for Moscone, who won in a landslide. Barbagelata announced he was retiring from politics. That year also marked the passage of the district election system by San Francisco voters. The city's first district elections for board of supervisors took place in November 1977. Among those elected were the city's first openly gay supervisor, Harvey Milk, single mother and attorney Carol Ruth Silver, Chinese American Gordon Lau, and fireman and police officer Dan White. Milk, Silver and Lau along with John Molinari and Robert Gonzales made up Moscone's allies on the board, while White, Dianne Feinstein, Quentin Kopp, Ella Hill Hutch, Lee Dolson, and Ron Pelosi formed a loosely organized coalition to oppose Moscone and his initiatives. Feinstein was elected president of the board of supervisors on a 6–5 vote, with Moscone's supporters backing Lau. It was generally believed that Feinstein, having twice lost election to the office of mayor, would support Kopp against Moscone in the 1979 election and retire rather than run for the board again.

==== Refusal to investigate Peoples Temple ====
In August 1977, after Peoples Temple leader Jim Jones fled to Jonestown following media scrutiny alleging criminal wrongdoing, Moscone announced that his office would not investigate Jones or Peoples Temple. The later mass murder-suicide at Jonestown dominated national headlines at the time of Moscone's death.

After the massacre, Temple members revealed to The New York Times that the Temple had arranged for "busloads" of members to be bused in from Redwood Valley to San Francisco to vote in the 1975 election. A former Temple member stated that many of those members were not registered to vote in San Francisco, while another former member said "Jones swayed elections." Prior to leaving San Francisco, Jones claimed to have bribed Moscone with sexual favors from female Temple members, including one who was underage; his son, Jim Jones, Jr., later remembered how Moscone frequented Temple parties "with a cocktail in his hand and doing some ass grabbing".

== Assassination ==
Late in 1978, Dan White resigned from the board of supervisors. His resignation would allow Moscone to choose White's successor, which could tip the board's balance of power in Moscone's favor. Recognizing this, those who supported a more conservative agenda and opposed integration of the police and fire departments talked White into changing his mind. White then requested that Moscone re-appoint him to his former seat.

Moscone originally indicated a willingness to reconsider, but more liberal city leaders, including supervisor Harvey Milk, lobbied him against the idea. Moscone ultimately decided not to appoint White. On November 27, 1978, three days after Moscone's 49th birthday, White went to San Francisco City Hall to meet with Moscone and purportedly to make a final plea for appointment. White sneaked into City Hall through a basement window to avoid the metal detector at the main door. He carried his old police revolver. When Moscone agreed to talk with him in a private room, White pulled the gun out of his suit jacket and shot and killed Moscone. White then re-loaded his gun and walked across City Hall to Milk's office, where White shot and killed Milk as well.

Dianne Feinstein, president of the board of supervisors, was sworn in as the city's new mayor and in the following years would emerge as one of California's most prominent politicians.

Six thousand mourners attended a service for Moscone at St. Mary's Cathedral.

White later turned himself in at the police station where he was formerly an officer. The term "Twinkie defense" has its origins in the murder trial that followed. White was convicted of the lesser crime of manslaughter, due in part to his claim of severe depression, which White's attorneys argued was evidenced by his consumption of Twinkies and other junk foods. Outrage over White's lenient sentence provoked a mass riot in San Francisco, during which police cars were set on fire by angry protestors. White was released from prison and then shortly afterward died by suicide in 1985.

Vigils are held annually to commemorate the assassinations of Moscone and Milk.

== Legacy ==
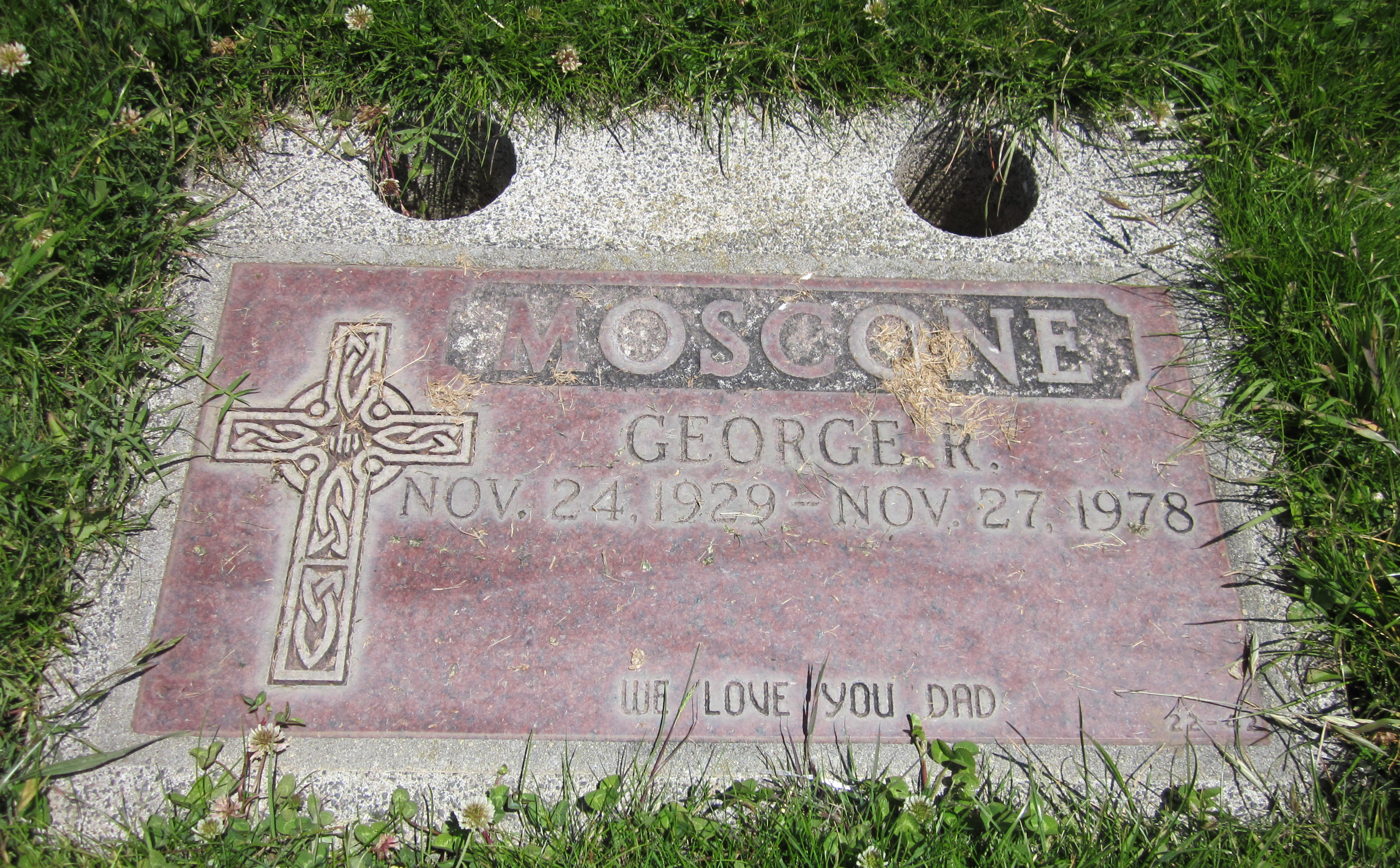
Moscone's grave at Holy Cross

Moscone is interred at Holy Cross Cemetery in Colma, California alongside his mother Lena.

Moscone Center, San Francisco's largest convention center and exhibition hall, is named in his honor. Moscone and Milk also have schools named after them: George Moscone Elementary, Harvey Milk Elementary and Harvey Milk High School.

Moscone's main political legacy is his opening up San Francisco City Hall to be a more diverse and inclusive place with political appointments that represented the full spectrum of the population, including minorities and the growing gay community. Despite a backlash from the political old guard and conservatives, and despite the double assassination of Mayor Moscone and Supervisor Harvey Milk, both leading progressives, the city never retreated from Moscone's more inclusive view of politics.

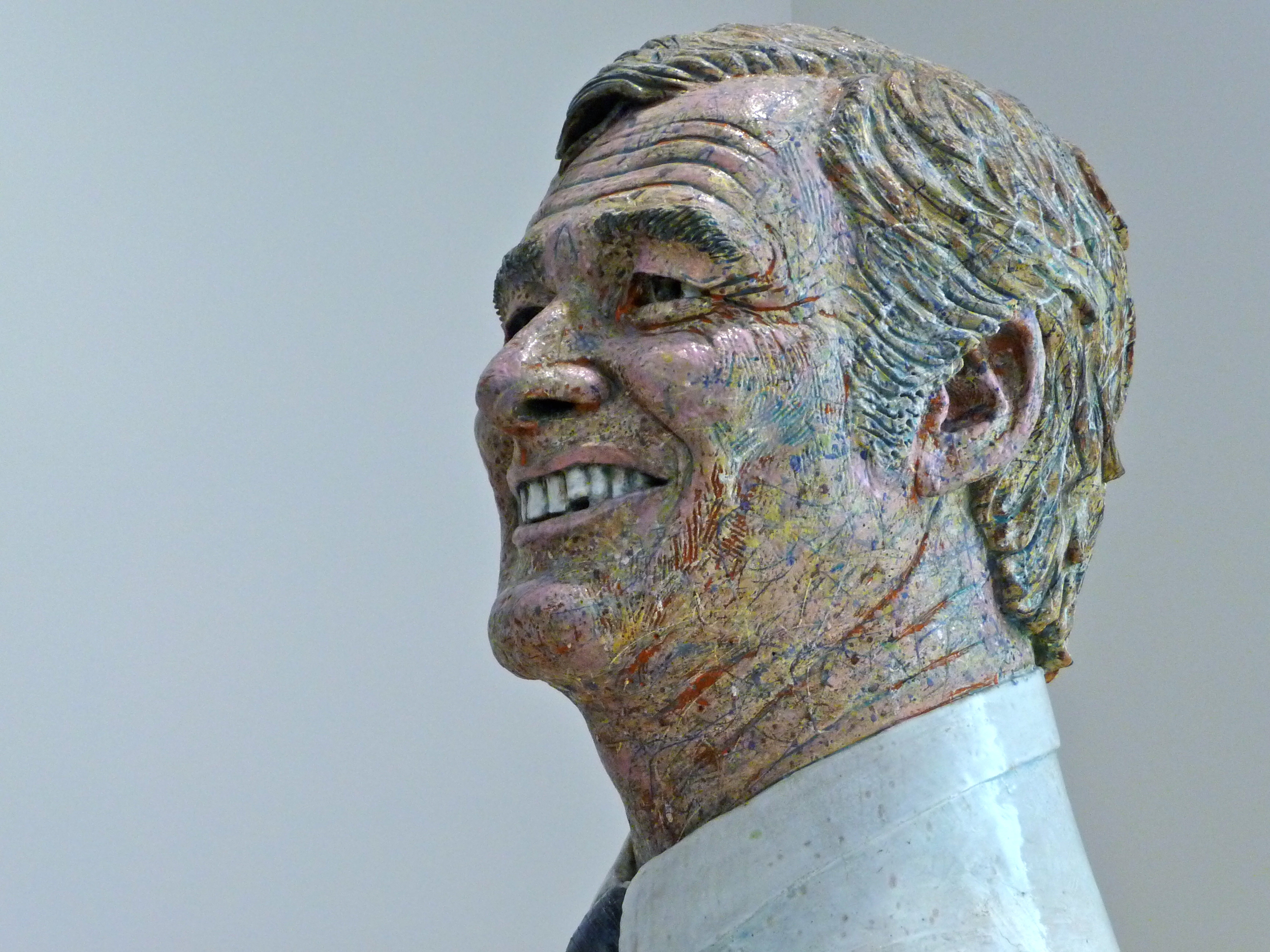
1981 bust by Robert Arneson

In 1980, sculptor Robert Arneson was commissioned to create a monument to Moscone to be installed in the new Moscone Convention Center. The bust portraying Moscone was done in Arneson's California Funk style and was accepted by San Francisco's Art Commission. Arneson included as part of the sculpture on the pedestal the likeness of a pistol, and references to Harvey Milk, the assassinations, the "Twinkie Defense", the White Night riots, and Dianne Feinstein's mayoral succession. Arneson refused to make alterations to the work, the commission was returned to him, and it was later resold to the SF Museum of Modern Art. In a critique of the event, Frederic Stout wrote that "Arneson's mistake was in presenting the city mothers/fathers with something honest, engaging and provoking, that is to say, a work of art. What they wanted, of course, was not a work of art at all. They wanted an object of ritual magic: the smiling head of a dead politician." In 1994, a new bust by San Francisco artist Spero Anargyros was unveiled, depicting Moscone holding a pen, below which are words from Moscone: "San Francisco is an extraordinary city, because its people have learned to live together with one another, to respect each other, and to work with each other for the future of their community. That's the strength and beauty of this city – it's the reason why the citizens who live here are the luckiest people in the world."

Moscone was portrayed by Victor Garber in Gus Van Sant's Harvey Milk biopic, Milk. Their murders were also the subject of the Dead Kennedys' version of the Sonny Curtis song "I Fought the Law". Moscone's son Jonathan, aged 14 at the time of his father's murder, later co-wrote the play Ghost Light with Tony Taccone about the effects the assassination had on him. It premiered at the Oregon Shakespeare Festival in 2011. A public television documentary about Moscone's political career, Moscone: A Legacy of Change, debuted in November 2018, the 40th anniversary of Moscone's death. Produced by Nat Katzman, written by Stephen Talbot and narrated by Peter Coyote.

== See also ==
- List of assassinated American politicians

Political offices
Preceded by Joseph Alioto	Mayor of San Francisco; 1976–1978	Succeeded by Dianne Feinstein
