= Chester Hartman =

American urban planner

Chester W. Hartman (1936–2023) was an American urban planner, author, and academic. He was Director of Research of the Poverty & Race Research Action Council (PRRAC) in Washington, D.C. Previously, he was PRRAC's Executive Director. He was also a Fellow of the Institute for Policy Studies in Washington and the Transnational Institute in Amsterdam as well as founder and former chair of the Planners Network, a national organization of progressive planners and community organizers. He has served on the faculty of Harvard University, Yale University, the University of North Carolina, Cornell University, the University of California, Berkeley, George Washington University, Columbia University, and, most recently, the University of Massachusetts, Boston.

Hartman has served on the Editorial Boards of the Journal of Negro Education, Journal of Urban Affairs, Housing Policy Debate, Urban Affairs Quarterly, Housing Studies, and the National Low Income Housing Coalition, of which he is former Secretary.

He has served as a consultant to numerous public and private agencies, including the United States Department of Housing and Urban Development, the United States Commission on Civil Rights, Stanford Research Institute (now named SRI International), Arthur D. Little, California Rural Legal Assistance, the Urban Coalition, the California Department of Housing and Community Development, and the Legal Aid Society of New York.

== Education ==
Hartman held a Ph.D. in City and Regional Planning from Harvard University.

== Selected publications ==
- 1973: Housing Urban America, Aldine, 1973 (rev. ed 1980), with Jon Pynoos and Robert Schafer.
- 1973: The World of the Urban Working Class, contributor, Harvard University Press, 1973, with Marc Fried (author), Ellen Fitzgerald, Peggy Gleicher, and Edwina Nary Bentz.
- 1974: Yerba Buena: Land Grab and Community Resistance in San Francisco, Glide, 1974.
- 1975: Housing and Social Policy, Prentice Hall, 1975.
- 1982: Displacement: How to Fight It, National Housing Law Project, 1982, with William Dennis Keating and Richard T. LeGates.
- 1983: America's Housing Crisis: What Is To Be Done?, Routledge & Kegan Paul, 1983.
- 1984: The Transformation of San Francisco, Rowman and Allanheld, 1984.
- 1986: Critical Perspectives on Housing, editor, Temple University, 1986, with Rachael G. Bratt (editor) and Ann Meyerson (editor).
- 1988: Winning America: Ideas & Leadership for the 1990s, editor, South End Press, 1988, with Marcus Raskin (editor).
- 1989: Housing Issues of the 1990s, Praeger, 1989, with Sara Rosenberry.
- 1992: Paradigms Lost: The Post Cold War Era, Pluto Press, 1992, with Pedro Villanova (editor).
- 1997: Double Exposure: Poverty and Race in America, M.E. Sharpe, 1997.
- 2001: Challenges to Equality: Poverty & Race in America, M.E. Sharpe, 2001.
- 2002: Between Eminence & Notoriety: Four Decades of Radical Urban Planning, Rutgers University Center for Urban Policy Research, 2002, with Jane Jacobs (foreword).
- 2002: City for Sale: The Transformation of San Francisco, University of California Press, 2002.
- 2006: The Right to Housing: Foundation of a New Social Agenda, Temple University, 2006. ISBN 1-59213-432-7
- 2006: Poverty & Race in America: The Emerging Agendas, Lexington Books, 2006, with Eric Foner, Jesse Jackson Jr., etc.
- 2006: There Is No Such Thing As a Natural Disaster: Race, Class & Hurricane Katrina, Routledge, 2006, with Gregory Squires.
- 2009: Mandate for Change: Policies and Leadership for 2009 and Beyond, Lexington Books, 2009, with Catherine Albisa, etc.
- 2010: The Integration Debate: Competing Futures for American Cities, Routledge, 2010, with Gregory Squires
- 2010: "Steps Toward a Just Metropolis," in What We See: Advancing the Observations of Jane Jacobs, New Village, 2010, pp. 167–175.
- 2013: From Foreclosure to Fair Lending, New Village, 2013, with Gregory Squires.
