= Center for Urban Policy Research =

US research institute

Coordinates: 40.493704°N 74.443457°W

The Center for Urban Policy Research is a public policy research institute housed at the Edward J. Bloustein School of Planning and Public Policy at Rutgers University, USA. Founded in 1969, it has completed over $40 million worth of research for governments and private foundations. Its work focuses on "affordable housing, land use policy, environmental impact analysis, state planning, public finance, land development practice, historic preservation, infrastructure assessment, development impact analysis, the costs of sprawl, transportation information systems, environmental impacts and community economic development."

The scholarly articles and books published by the CUPR Press have been well respected by policy makers.
