= Elaine (given name) =

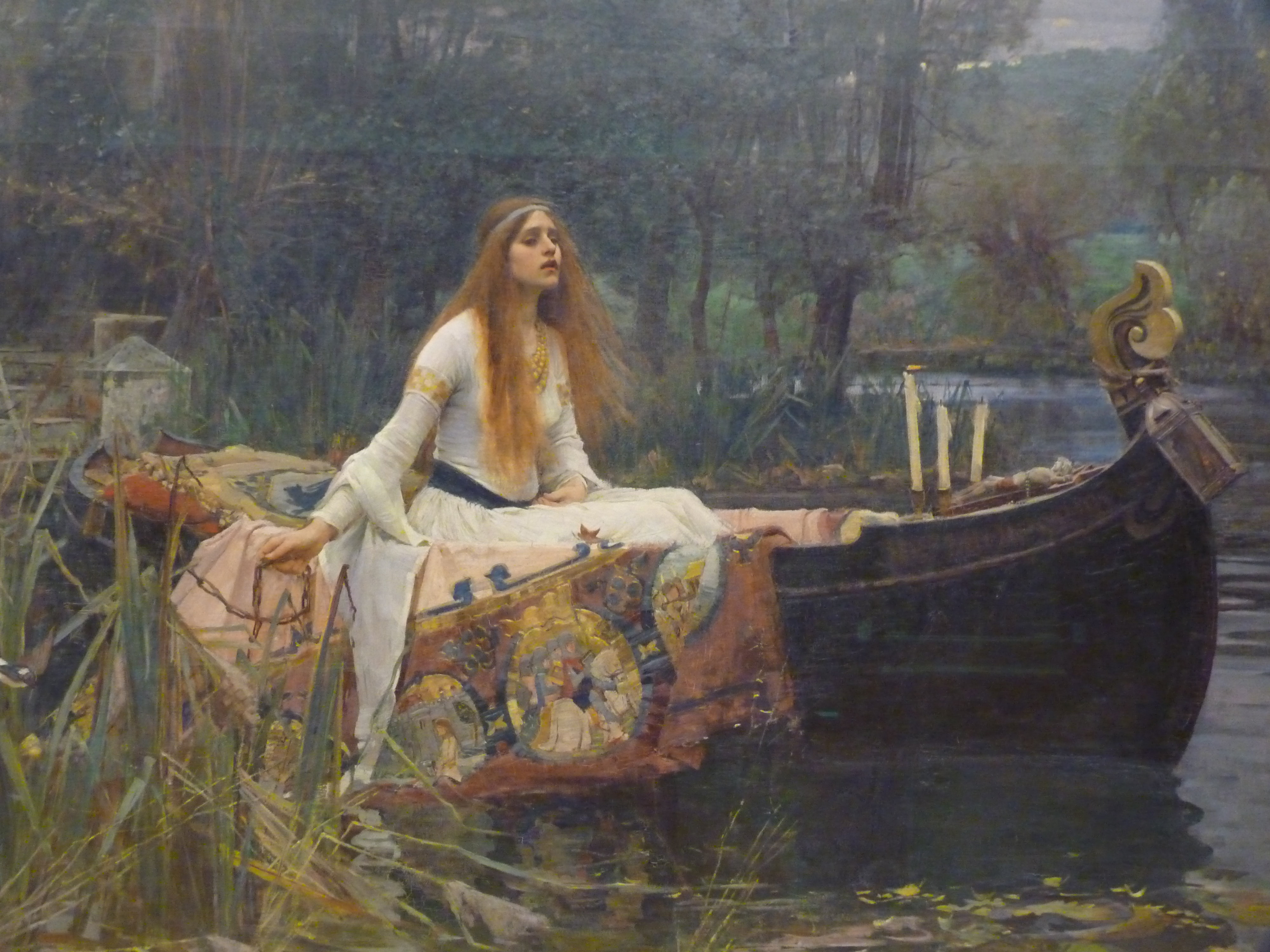
- The Lady of Shalott by John William Waterhouse.
- Pronunciation: /iːˈleɪn/
- Gender: Female
- Language: English

Origin
- Languages: 1. Ancient Greek; 2. Welsh
- Meaning: 1. 'ray' 2. 'young deer'

Other names
- Related names: Elaina, Elayne, Helen, Lainey

Elaine is a feminine given name, an Old French form of the name Helen. The name Elaine was popularized in the Anglosphere by its use by Alfred, Lord Tennyson for a character in his 1859 Arthurian romance Idylls of the King. It has also been suggested that the name might actually be derived from a Welsh word meaning 'young deer'.

Notable people with the name include:

== Arts and entertainment ==
- Elaine Agnew (born 1967), Irish composer
- Elaine Anderson Steinbeck (1914–2003), American actress
- Elaine Anthony (1943–1996), American mixed media painter
- Elaine Arnold (1910–2006), American opera singer
- Elaine Badgley Arnoux (1926–2023), American visual artist
- Elaine Barkin (1932–2023), American composer, writer and educator
- Elaine Barrie (1915–2003), American actress
- Elaine Bass, American title designer and filmmaker
- Elaine Bedell, English television producer
- Elaine Bonazzi (1929–2019), American operatic mezzo-soprano
- Elaine Bradley (born 1984), American drummer
- Elaine Breiger, American painter
- Elaine Bromka (born 1950), American actress
- Elaine Brown (born 1943), American singer, writer, and former Black Panther Party chairwoman
- Elaine Cameron-Weir, Canadian artist
- Elaine Cancilla Orbach (1940–2009), American actress and dancer
- Elaine Carhartt (born 1951), American ceramist
- Elaine Carroll, American actress and writer
- Elaine Christy, American harpist
- Elaine Coghlan (1897–1989), Australian impressionist artist and art teacher
- Elaine Lustig Cohen (1927–2016), American artist and graphic designer
- Elaine Collins (born 1958), Scottish actress and producer
- Elaine Comparone, American harpsichordist
- Elaine Constantine, British writer and photographer
- Elaine Crombie, Australian actress
- Elaine Delmar (born 1939), British singer
- Elaine Devry (1930–2023), American actress
- Elaine Douvas, American oboist and musician
- Elaine Duillo (1928–2021), American painter and illustrator
- Elaine Dundy (1921–2008), American writer and actress
- Elaine Dunn, American singer, dancer and actress
- Elaine Duran (born 1998), Filipino singer and actress
- Elaine Ellis, Scottish actress
- Elaine Fifield (1930–1999), Australian ballerina
- Elaine Fine (born 1959), American musician and composer
- Elaine George, Australian model
- Elaine Giftos (born 1945), American actress
- Elaine Glover, English actress, singer and chef
- Elaine Goble (born 1956), Canadian visual artist
- Elaine M. Goodwin, British mosaic artist
- Elaine Grand (1926–2001), Canadian broadcaster
- Elaine Green (1940–2014), American television journalist
- Elaine Hamill, New Zealand actress
- Elaine Hamilton-O'Neal (1920–2010), American artist
- Elaine Hammerstein (1894–1948), American actress
- Elaine Haxton (1909–1999), Australian artist
- Elaine Hendrix (born 1970), American actress
- Elaine Hudson, Australian actress
- Elaine Hugh-Jones (1927–2021), Welsh pianist
- Elaine Irwin (born 1969), American model
- Elaine Ives-Cameron (1938–2006), British-American actress
- Elaine Jin (born 1954), Hong Kong–Taiwanese actress
- Elaine Joyce (born 1945), American actress
- Elaine Kao, American actress
- Elaine Keillor (born 1939), Canadian pianist
- Elaine A. King, American curator, critic professor and editor
- Elaine Kinsella (born 1981), Irish broadcaster
- Elaine de Kooning (1918–1989), American expressionist painter
- Elaine Kowalsky (1948–2005), Canadian printmaker and artists' rights campaigner
- Elaine Kraf (1936–2013), American novelist and painter
- Elaine Laron (1930–2013), American songwriter and lyricist
- Elaine Ling (c. 1946–2016), Canadian photographer
- Elaine Lordan (born 1966), English former actress
- Elaine Lui (born 1973), Canadian journalist
- Elaine Madsen (born 1932), American filmmaker and author
- Elaine Mai, Irish singer
- Elaine Malbin (born 1932), American opera singer
- Elaine Martone, American record producer
- Elaine May (born 1932), American film director, screenwriter and actress
- Elaine Mayes (born 1936), American photographer
- Elaine McDonald (1943–2018), Scottish ballerina
- Elaine McKenna (1937–1992), Australian singer
- Elaine Miles (born 1960), Native American actress
- Elaine Mitchener, British experimental singer
- Elaine Mukheli (born 1999), South African singer
- Elaine Mulqueen (1932–2012), American actress
- Elaine Murtagh, Irish singer and songwriter
- Elaine Ng (born 1972), Hong Kong actress
- Elaine Padmore, British opera administrator, broadcaster and author
- Elaine Paige (born 1948), English actress and singer
- Elaine Pope, American film producer and writer
- Elaine Princi (born 1946), American actress
- Elaine Proctor, South African film director
- Elaine Rapp (1927–2019), American sculptor, educator and art therapist
- Elaine Reichek, American visual artist
- Elaine Riley (1917–2015), American actress
- Elaine Shaffer (1925–1973), American flutist
- Elaine McMillion Sheldon, American documentary filmmaker
- Elaine Shepard (1913–1998), American actress
- Elaine Shore (1929–2007), American actress
- Elaine Stocki, Canadian photographer, painter and professor
- Elaine Stritch (1925–2014), American actress
- Elaine Sturtevant (1924–2014), American artist
- Elaine Summers (1925–2014), American choreographer, experimental filmmaker and intermedia pioneer
- Elaine Tan (born 1979), English actress
- Elaine Thornburgh, American musician
- Elaine Usher (1932–2014), English actress
- Elaine Hoffman Watts (1932–2017), American klezmer drummer
- Elaine Welteroth (born 1986), American journalist, editor, author and television host
- Elaine Willcox, English television presenter
- Elaine Yiu (born 1980), Hong Kong actress

== Politics ==
- Elaine Alquist (1944–2024), American politician
- Elaine Andrews-Ahearn, American politician
- Élaine Ayotte, Canadian politician and diplomat
- Elaine Baxter (1933–2021), American politician and educator
- Elaine Beech (born 1960), American politician
- Elaine Bloom (born 1937), American politician
- Elaine Bowers (born 1963), American politician
- Elaine E. Bucklo (born 1944), American judge
- Elaine Carbines (born 1957), Australian politician
- Elaine Chao (born 1953), United States Secretary of Labor
- Elaine Coderre (born 1947), American politician
- Elaine Darling (1936–2019), Australian politician
- Elaine Edwards (1929–2018), American politician
- Elaine Farmer (1937–2001), American politician
- Elaine French, American politician
- Elaine Gannon (born 1953), American politician
- Elaine Gordon (1931–2000), American politician
- Elaine Gumbs-Vlaun (born 1944), St Maartener social worker and politician
- Elaine Hammers, American politician
- Elaine Harder (1947–2013), American politician and businesswoman
- Elaine Harvey (born 1954), American politician
- Elaine Hopson (born 1939), American politician
- Elaine Jentsch (born 1994), German politician
- Elaine D. Kaplan (born 1955), American judge
- Elaine Kellett-Bowman (1923–2014), British politician
- Elaine Lauterborn, American politician
- Elaine Luria (born 1975), American politician
- Elaine Marshall (born 1945), American politician
- Elaine Marzola, American politician
- Elaine Masukat, Filipino lawyer and government official
- Elaine McCart (1928–2021), American nurse and politician
- Elaine McCoy (1946–2020), Canadian politician
- Elaine McCusker, American government official
- Élaine Michaud (born 1985), Canadian politician
- Elaine Murray (born 1954), British politician
- Elaine Nekritz (born 1957), American politician
- Elaine Nile (1936–2011), Australian politician
- Elaine Noble (born 1944), American politician
- Elaine Phillips (born 1959), American politician
- Elaine Price, American politician
- Elaine Schwartz (born 1943), American politician
- Elaine Scruggs, American politician
- Elaine Sena Cortez, American politician
- Elaine Stack (died 2020), American judge
- Elaine Stuhr (born 1936), American politician
- Elaine Swinford, American politician
- Elaine Szymoniak (1920–2009), American politician
- Elaine Thomson (born 1957), Scottish politician
- Elaine Trepper (born 1955), Namibian politician
- Elaine Wells (born 1951), American politician
- Élaine Zakaïb (1959–2018), Canadian politician
- Elaine Ziemba, Canadian politician

== Sports ==
- Elaine Allard (born 1977), Canadian wheelchair basketball player
- Elaine Aylward, camogie player
- Elaine Badrock, English footballer
- Elaine Barrett (born 1977), British Paralympic swimmer
- Elaine Bourbeau (born 1949), Canadian rower
- Elaine Bray (1940–1998), Australian cricketer
- Elaine Breeden (born 1988), American swimmer
- Elaine Burke, Irish camogie player
- Elaine Chan (born 1988), Hong Kong Olympic swimmer
- Elaine Cheris (born 1946), American Olympic fencer
- Elaine Chuli (born 1994), Canadian ice hockey goaltender
- Elaine Crosby (born 1958), American professional golfer
- Elaine Cunningham (cricketer), Jamaican cricketer
- Elaine Dagg-Jackson (born 1955), Canadian curler and coach
- Elaine Elliott (born 1955), American basketball player
- Elaine Emmanual, Jamaican cricketer
- Elaine Farquharson-Black (born 1968), Scottish amateur golfer
- Elaine Genovese (born 1991), Maltese tennis player
- Elaine Gray (born 1958), British swimmer
- Eliane Hugentobler (born 1981), Swiss ice dancer
- Elaine Jensen (born 1955), New Zealand field hockey player
- Elaine Kasilag (born 1994), Filipina volleyball player
- Elaine Koon (born 1993), Malaysian rhythmic gymnast
- Elaine Lister (born 1962), Scottish wheelchair curler
- Elaine McLaughlin (born 1963), Northern Irish hurdler
- Elaine E Moura (born 1982), Brazilian football (soccer) player
- Elaine Nolan (born 1981), Irish cricketer
- Elaine O'Connor (born 1982), Irish footballer
- Elaine Pedersen (1936–2000), American long-distance runner
- Elaine Pen (born 1990), Dutch equestrian
- Elaine Powell (born 1975), American basketball player
- Elaine Ratcliffe (born 1972), English amateur golfer
- Elaine Rosenthal (1896–1993), American golfer
- Elaine Roth (1929–2007), American baseball player
- Elaine Shenton, British tennis player
- Elaine Silburn (1928–2022), Canadian sprinter
- Elaine Sortino (1949–2013), American softball coach
- Elaine Tanner (born 1951), Canadian swimmer
- Elaine Teo (born 1981), Malaysian taekwondo practitioner
- Elaine Thompson-Herah (born 1992), Jamaican sprinter
- Elaine Tierney (born 1999), American rower
- Elaine Van Blunk (born 1964), American long-distance runner
- Elaine Vassie (born 1981), Scottish rugby union footballer and coach
- Elaine Watt (1929–1985), American equestrian
- Elaine Watt (barrel racer), Canadian barrel racer
- Elaine White (born 1944), New Zealand cricketer
- Elaine Willett (born 1956), British gymnast
- Elaine Wulcko (born 1959), English cricketer
- Elaine Youngs (born 1970), American beach volleyball player
- Elaine Zayak (born 1965), American figure skater

== Others ==
- Elaine Abrams, American physician and epidemiologist
- Elaine M. Alphin (1955–2014), American novelist
- Elaine Anaya (1943–2021), First Lady of New Mexico
- Elaine Anderson (1936–2002), American paleontologist
- Elaine Aron (born 1944), American clinical research psychologist and author
- Elaine Avila, American dramatist
- Elaine Sweital Avner (1938–2017), American astronomer
- Elaine Baker, Australian marine geoscientist
- Elaine Bartlett, African American activist
- Elaine Batchlor, American rheumatologist
- Elaine Bearer, American neurobiologist and pathologist
- Elaine Bellew-Bryan, Baroness Bellew (born 1973), South African-born Irish nurse
- Elaine Bergstrom (born 1946), American novelist
- Elaine Bernard, Canadian historian
- Elaine Black Yoneda (1906–1988), American labor and civil rights activist
- Elaine Bossik, American novelist and screenwriter
- Elaine Brody (1922–2014), American gerontologist and sociologist
- Elaine Brown (born 1940), involved with a dispute with the US government
- Elaine Bullard (1915–2011), British botanist
- Elaine Campione, Canadian woman who murdered her two children
- Elaine Sterne Carrington (1891–1958), American dramatist
- Elaine Castillo (born 1984), American novelist
- Elaine M. Catley (1889–1984), Canadian poet
- Elaine Chen, academic specializing in the haptic technology field
- Elaine J. Coates (born 1937), American social worker and educator
- Elaine Coffman (born 1942), American writer
- Elaine Cohen (born 1944), American mathematician
- Elaine Coughlan, Irish venture capitalist
- Elaine Cunningham (born 1957), American novelist
- Elaine Davidson, Brazilian woman
- Elaine Dennison, British New Zealand rheumatologist
- Elaine Denniston (born 1939), American lawyer
- Elaine DePrince (1947–2024), American author, activist, teacher and advocate
- Elaine Diacumakos (1930–1984), American cell biologist and head of the cytobiology laboratory
- Elaine Didier (born 1948), American director
- Elaine DiMasi, American physicist
- Elaine Donnelly, American conservative activist
- Elaine Duke (born 1958), American civil servant
- Elaine Howard Ecklund (born 1973), American professor
- Elaine Eksvärd (born 1981), Swedish author
- Elaine Englehardt, American philosopher
- Elaine Equi (born 1953), American poet
- Elaine Esposito (1934–1978), American who had held the record for longest coma
- Elaine Estes (born 1931), American librarian
- Elaine Fantham (1933–2016), British-Canadian classicist
- Elaine Feeney, Irish writer
- Elaine Feinstein (1930–2019), English poet and writer
- Elaine Feldman (1916–2006), Irish public figure and co-founder
- Elaine Fleming, American mayor
- Elaine Flinn (1939–2008), American author and antiques dealer
- Elaine Forrestal, Western Australian writer
- Elaine Fox, neuroscientist and researcher
- Elaine Fuchs (born 1950), American cell biologist
- Elaine Garzarelli, American financial analyst
- Elaine Graham, British academic
- Élaine Greffulhe (1882–1958), French aristocrat
- Elaine Gurr (1896–1996), New Zealand doctor and medical administrator
- Elaine Tuttle Hansen, American academic administrator, scholar and university professor
- Elaine Harger (born 1956), American librarian
- Elaine D. Harmon (1919–2015), American aviator
- Elaine Hatfield (born 1937), American social psychologist
- Elaine Ryan Hedges (1927–1997), American feminist
- Elaine Hills-Young, British nurse
- Elaine Holmes, Australian systems biologist
- Elaine Holt (born 1966), British businesswoman
- Elaine Horseman (1925–1999), British children's writer
- Elaine Ingham, American microbiologist and soil biology researcher
- Elaine Inglesby-Burke, British nurse
- Elaine L. Jack (1928–2025), 12th Relief Society general president of the Church of Jesus Christ of Latter-day Saints
- Elaine Jackson, American playwright
- Elaine Jaffe, American pathologist
- Elaine Jones (born 1944), American attorney and activist
- Elaine Kahn, American poet
- Elaine Kant, American computer scientist
- Elaine Trebek Kares, American businesswoman
- Elaine Kasimatis (1952–2021), American mathematician
- Elaine Kaufman (1929–2010), American restaurateur
- Elaine Ko, American television writer and producer
- E. L. Konigsburg (1930–2013), American writer
- Elaine Koppelman (1937–2019), American mathematician
- Elaine Lafferty, American journalist
- Elaine LaLanne (born 1926), American fitness, nutrition guru and author
- Elaine L. Larson (born 1943), American infectious disease specialist
- Elaine J. Lawless, American folklorist
- Eliane Le Breton (1897–1977), French MD and physiologist
- Elaine Lindsay, Australian academic and feminist theologian
- Elaine Marjory Little (1884–1974), Australian pathologist
- Elaine Lorillard (1914–2007), American socialite
- Elaine MacInnes (1924–2022), Canadian nun and Zen master
- Elaine Mardis (born 1962), American geneticist
- Elaine Nicpon Marieb (1936–2018), American anatomist
- Elaine Tettemer Marshall (born 1942), American billionaire heiress
- Elaine Martin, British chemical engineer, statistician and academic
- Elaine Matthews (1942–2011), British classical scholar
- Elaine Mazlish (1925–2017), American author and parent educator
- Elaine J. McCarthy (born 1966), American projection and video designer
- Elaine M. McGraw, American computer programmer
- Elaine Middleton (1929–2019), Belizean educator, public servant and charity worker
- Elaine Mikels (1921–2004), American activist
- Elaine Miller, Scottish physiotherapist
- Elaine Mokhtefi, Algerian activist and author
- Elaine Kalman Naves, Hungarian-born Canadian writer, journalist, editor and lecturer
- Elaine Nicholson, English autism advocate
- Elaine O'Beirne-Ranelagh (1914–1996), American writer and folklorist
- Elaine O'Brien (1955–2014), American flight instructor
- Elaine Oran (born 1946), American aerospace engineer
- Elaine Ostrander, American geneticist
- Elaine Ostroff (born 1933), American designer educator
- Elaine Pagels (born 1943), American religious historian
- Elaine Parent (1942–2002), American criminal
- Elaine Parker (1926–2009), American community activist
- Elaine L. Pico, American pediatric physiatrist
- Elaine Pritchard (1926–2012), English chess player
- Elaine Quijano (born 1974), American journalist
- Elaine Rawlinson (1911–1989), American stamp designer
- Elaine Reese, American-New Zealand psychology academic
- Elaine Rich, American computer scientist
- Elaine Romagnoli (1942–2021), American businesswoman
- Elaine Romero, Latina playwright
- Elaine Ron (1943–2010), American epidemiologist
- Elaine Roulet (1930–2020), American Roman Catholic sister of the Sisters of St. Joseph
- Elaine Rush, New Zealand-born professor of nutrition
- Elaine Ryan (1905–1981), American screenwriter and playwright
- Elaine Sadler, Australian astrophysicist
- Elaine Salo (c. 1962–2016), South African anthropologist, scholar and activist
- Elaine Sanceau (1896–1978), British historian
- Elaine Saunders, engineer, audiologist, inventor and entrepreneur
- Elaine Scarry (born 1946), American academic
- Elaine Melotti Schmidt, American educator, philanthropist, art curator and collector
- Elaine Schuster (1932–2022), American philanthropist
- Elaine Sciolino, American writer
- Elaine P. Scott, American engineer
- Elaine Shannon (born 1946), American journalist
- Elaine Shemilt (born 1954), British artist and researcher
- Elaine Shi, Chinese-American computer scientist and cryptographer
- Elaine Showalter (born 1941), American literary critic, feminist and writer
- Elaine Sisman (born 1952), American musicologist
- Elaine Weddington Steward, American lawyer
- Elaine Storkey (born 1944), English philosopher, sociologist and theologian
- Elaine Stratford, Australian geographer
- Elaine Svenonius (born 1933), American librarian
- Elaine Tarone, American linguist
- Elaine Terranova (born 1939), American poet
- Elaine M. Tobin (born 1944), American plant biologist
- Elaine G. Toms, Canadian information scientist
- Elaine Treharne, Welsh historian and academic
- Elaine Tuomanen (born 1951), American biologist
- Elaine Turner, American fashion designer
- Elaine Ullian, American health academic and administrator
- Elaine Unterhalter, South African educational researcher
- Elaine Valdov, activist
- Elaine Viets (born 1950), American novelist
- Elaine Wainwright (1948–2024), Australian theologian
- Elaine West, English Royal Air Force officer
- Elaine Weyuker (born 1945), American computer scientist
- Elaine Williams (1933–1961), American lesbian pulp paperback author and editor
- Elaine Macmann Willoughby (1926–2012), American educator and writer
- Elaine Wyllie (born 1953), American neurologist
- Elaine Wynn (1942–2025), American billionaire businesswoman, art collector, philanthropist and education reformer
- Elaine Zackai, professor of pediatrics

== Disambiguation ==
- Elaine Cassidy, multiple people
- Elaine Crowley, multiple people
- Elaine Davis, multiple people
- Elaine Kim, multiple people
- Elaine Lee, multiple people
- Elaine Morgan, multiple people
- Elaine Murphy, multiple people
- Elaine O'Neal, multiple people
- Elaine Richardson, multiple people
- Elaine Smith, multiple people
- Elaine Stewart, multiple people
- Elaine Taylor, multiple people
- Elaine Walker, multiple people
- Elaine Winter, multiple people

== Fictional characters ==
- Elaine (legend), several Arthurian-legend characters, including Elaine of Astolat.
- Elaine Belloc, a character in the Lucifer comic series
- Elaine Benes, Seinfeld character
- Elaine Jarvis, EastEnders character
- Elaine Marley, Monkey Island character
- Elaine Nardo, Taxi character
- Elaine Peacock, EastEnders character

== See also ==
- Lo Po Bia Elaine, character in Tower of God
