= Diakoumakos =

Diakoumakos or Diacumakos is a surname. Notable people with the surname include:

- Iakovidis Diakoumakos
- Elaine Diacumakos
