= Michael Pritchard =

Michael Pritchard may refer to:

- Mike Pritchard (born 1969), American football player
- Michael S. Pritchard, American philosopher
- Mike Dirnt (Michael Pritchard, born 1972), American musician
- Michael Pritchard (comedian) (born 1949 or 1950), American comedian, youth counselor, and advocate of social emotional learning
- Michael Pritchard, British developer of the LifeSaver bottle
