= Elaine Saunders =

Elaine Saunders may refer to:

- Elaine Pritchard (1926–2012), née Saunders, English chess player
- Elaine Saunders (scientist), Australian academic and entrepreneur
