= Elayne =

Female given name

Elayne is a female given name of French origin, which means "light". The name is a variant of Elaine, Elaina, and Helen .

Elayne may refer to:

== People ==
- Elayne Angel, American professional body piercer
- Elayne Arrington, American mathematician and engineer
- Elayne Boosler (born 1952), American comedian
- Elayne Brenzinger (born 1951), Canadian politician
- Elayne Cortois, Belgian beauty queen
- Elayne Rapping (1938–2016), American writer
- Elayne Reiss-Weimann (born 1933), American teacher and writer
- Elayne Jones (1928–2022), first Black principal player in a major American orchestra

== Fictional characters ==
- Elayne Trakand, a character in Robert Jordan's The Wheel of Time series of novels

== See also ==
- Elaine (given name)
- Elena (given name)
