= Belize Red Cross Society =

- Founded: 1950
- Type: Non-profit organisation
- Purpose: Humanitarian Aid
- Location: Belize
- Affiliations: International Committee of the Red Cross; International Federation of Red Cross and Red Crescent Societies

The Belize Red Cross Society was founded in 1950 by Dr. Daniel Tenenbaum and Dr. Paul Lawrence of Belmopan City Hospital. Previously it was part of the British Red Cross. It has its headquarters in Belize City.

== See also ==
- Elaine Middleton, long-serving director-general
