= Elaine Rawlinson =

American stamp designer

Elaine Rawlinson (January 26, 1911 - October 19, 1989) was an American artist known for being the first female stamp designer in the United States.

== Education ==
Rawlinson graduated from the National Academy of Design School in 1934. She spend time studying at the Beaux-Arts Institute and the Pennsylvania Fines Arts Country School.

== Work ==
In 1933 Rawlinson won a competition to design a stamp that honored past presidents. This was the first national competition for stamp design hosted by the United States Post Office Department. The stamp design was for a presidential series to feature George Washington, in what would become the Presidential Series of 1938, or the 'Prexies'. Rawlinson submitted her design based on sculptor Jean Antoine Houdon's bust of Washington, and she won the top prize for which she received $500. She was also the first U.S. stamp designer who did not work for the Bureau of Engraving and Printing. The stamp went on sale in 1938.

Rawlinson was also responsible for designing the Philippines' 2-centavos stamp, featuring Jose Rizal y Mercado, in 1940.

== See also ==
- Lily Spandorf, the second female stamp designer in the U.S.
- Catherine L. Manning, noted American philatelist and judge for the 1938 competition.
