= Elaine O'Neal =

Elaine O'Neil may refer to:

- Elaine Hamilton-O'Neal (1920–2010), American abstract painter and muralist
- Elaine O'Neal (photographer) (born 1946), American photographer
- Elaine O'Neal (politician), American politician and judge
