= Elaine Valdov =

Activist

Elaine Valdov is President and Founder of The International Institute for a Culture of Peace As a peace and human rights activist and conflict resolution specialist, Valdov lectures internationally and is best known for her work in championing and building initiatives worldwide, in support of the UN Millennium Development Goals (MDGs) and UNESCO’s International Decade for the Promotion of a Culture of Peace and Non-Violence for the Children of the World. She has chaired task forces for women empowerment and gender equality; and founded “Yoga Peace Ambassadors” to teach MDG humanitarian service options in Yoga Ashrams worldwide.

Valdov has held many NGO positions at UN Headquarters in New York, including:

- Chair: Executive Committee of NGOs Affiliated with the United Nations Department of Public Information 1996-2000 (outreaching to civil society and NGOs worldwide, to enhance the partnerships between the United Nations, Governments and NGOs in addressing world challenges.
- Co-Convener: Seoul International Conference of NGOs: The Role of NGOs in the 21st Century.
- Secretary General: Medical Assembly at the United Nations (focused on reversing the World Health Organization and World Bank’s predicted world pandemic of cancer.)
- Chair: NGO Committee on the University for Peace.
- VP, Member of Executive Committee and Advisory Committee to the UN Secretary General: As President of the DPI Executive Committee, Dr Valdov, was on the Millennium NGO Forum Advisory Committee to the UN Secretary General in 1997 and 2000.

She has been a director of mental health facilities and a trauma counselor, with persons from countries around the world. Following September 11, Valdov was the director of the September 11 family relations and established programs in the US and abroad, helping families to deal with disasters, with special focus on helping widows and children who are caught in the midst of violence and terrorism. She further has worked with Lions Club International, Rotary International and (FAF) in the creation and implementation of the post-September-11 programs of (“Finding New Hope”) and (“Universal Hug for Peace”).
