= Michael S. Pritchard =

American philosopher

Michael Pritchard
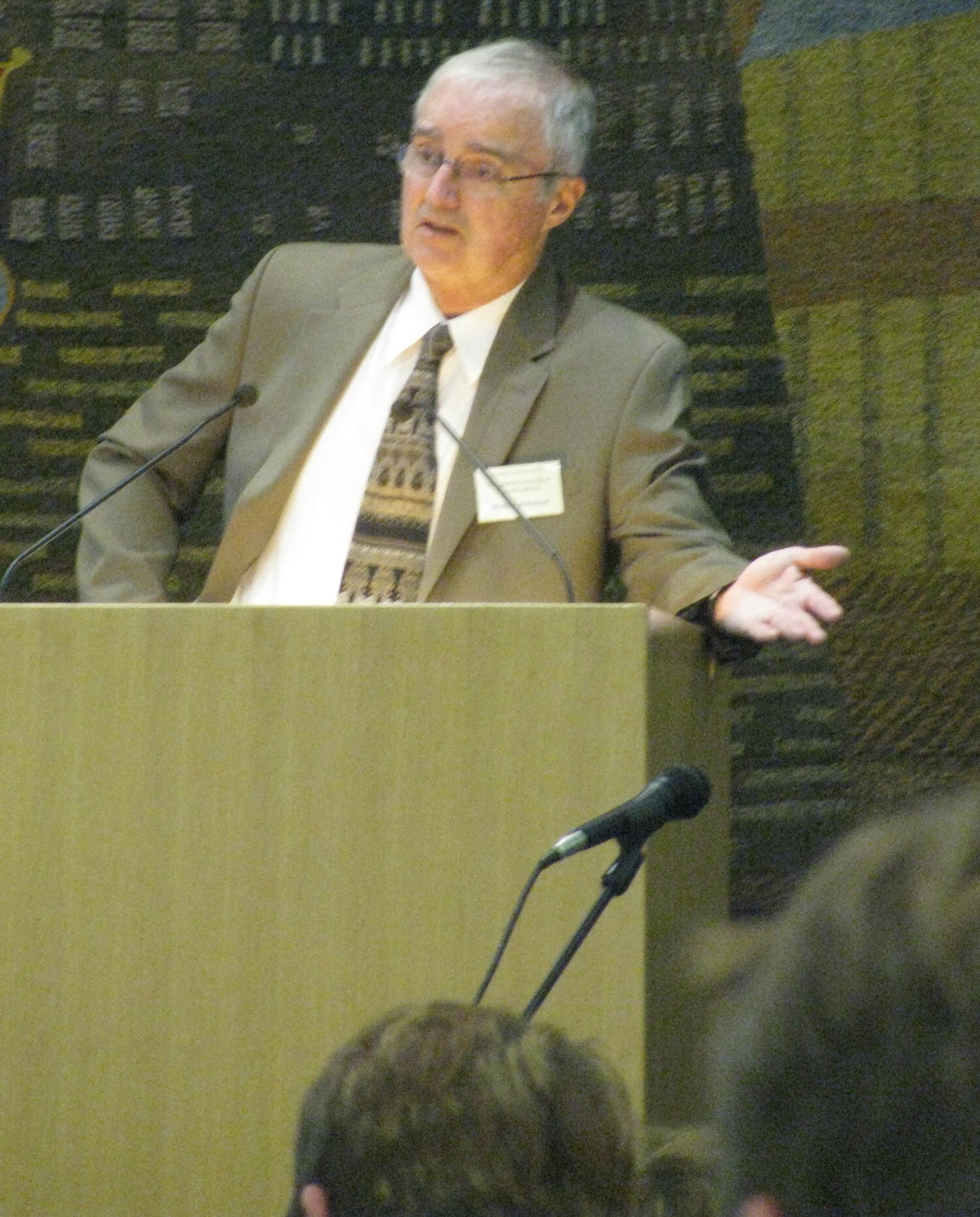
- Spouse: Elaine Englehardt

Philosophical work
- Era: 21st-century philosophy
- Region: Western philosophy
- School: Analytic
- Institutions: Western Michigan University
- Main interests: ethical theory

Michael Pritchard is an American philosopher and the Willard A. Brown Emeritus Professor of Philosophy at Western Michigan University.

== Books ==
- Englehardt, Elaine E.; Pritchard, Michael S. (eds.). Ethics across the curriculum—pedagogical perspectives. Cham: Springer-Verlag.
- Charles Harris, Michael J. Rabins, Michael S. Pritchard. Engineering Ethics: Concepts and Cases
- Lisa H. Newton, Elaine E. Englehardt, Michael S. Pritchard. Clashing Views in Business Ethics and Society
- Michael S. Pritchard. Professional Integrity: Thinking Ethically (2006)
- Elaine E. Englehardt, Michael S. Pritchard, Kerry D. Romesburg, Brian Schrag. Ethical Challenges of Academic Administration, Springer 2009
- Philosophical Adventures with Children
- On Becoming Responsible
- Communication Ethics
- Reasonable Children
