= Elaine Chen =

Academic specializing in robotics

Elaine Chen is an academic and an engineering executive in the haptic technology field. She is named as the lead inventor on the Microsoft patent for the force feedback joystick.

== Biography ==
Chen earned bachelor's and master's degrees in engineering at the Massachusetts Institute of Technology.

Chen has served as VP of several companies, including Rethink Robotics, Zeo, Zeemote, and SensAble Technologies.

In 2005, Chen founded Conceptspring, a consulting business.

From 2011 to 2020, Chen was a senior lecturer at the MIT Sloan School of Management and an entrepreneur-in-Residence at the Martin Trust Center for MIT Entrepreneurship.

In 2017, Chen was selected by the AAAS-Lemelson Invention Ambassadors Program as one of the year's seven Invention Ambassadors.

Since 2020, Chen has served as the Cummings Family Professor of the Practice in Entrepreneurship and as the director of the Tufts Entrepreneurship Center.

As of 2022, Chen was on the advisory board of Cybernetix Ventures.

== Published works ==
=== Books ===
- Chen, Elaine (21 February 2015). Bringing a Hardware Product to Market: Navigating the Wild Ride from Concept to Mass Production. ISBN 9781505380835.

=== Articles ===
- E. Chen and B. Marcus, "Force feedback for surgical simulation," in Proceedings of the IEEE, vol. 86, no. 3, pp. 524-530, March 1998, doi: 10.1109/5.662877.
- Cohen, A, & Chen, E. "Six Degree-of-Freedom Haptic System as a Desktop Virtual Prototyping Interface." Proceedings of the ASME 1999 International Mechanical Engineering Congress and Exposition. Dynamic Systems and Control. Nashville, Tennessee, USA. November 14–19, 1999. pp. 401-402. ASME. https://doi.org/10.1115/IMECE1999-0053
