= Elaine Jensen =

New Zealand field hockey player (born 1955)

Elaine Beryl Jensen (born 18 March 1955) is a former field hockey goalkeeper from New Zealand, who finished in eighth position with the National Women's Team at the 1992 Summer Olympics in Barcelona.
