= Elaine Kim =

Elaine Kim may refer to:

- Elaine H. Kim (born 1942), Korean-American writer and professor of Asian American Studies
- Elaine Kim (fashion designer) (born 1962), Korean American fashion designer
