= Elaine Winter =

Elaine Winter may refer to:

- Elaine Winter (athlete) (born 1932), South African sprinter
- Elaine Winter (figure skater) (1895–?), German figure skater
