= Elaine Marjory Little =

Australian pathologist (1884–1974)

- Born: 2 June 1884
- Died: 2 May 1974 (aged 89)
- Occupation: Pathologist
- British Armed Forces
- Allegiance: Allies of World War I
- Branch: British Army
- Service years: 1918
- Rank: Captain
- Unit: Royal Army Medical Corps

Elaine Marjory Little (2 June 1884 – 2 May 1974) was an Australian pathologist.

The daughter of Joseph Henry Little, a medical practitioner born in Ireland, and Agnes Elisabeth Mellor, his wife, a native of England, she was born in Brisbane. The family moved to England following the death of her mother. Dr. Little returned to Australia and practised in Armidale and later Brisbane. She was educated in Brisbane, in England and at the Girls' High School in Armidale, going on to receive a BSc and MB from the University of Sydney. From 1914 to 1915, Little was a pathology demonstrator at the university. She served as junior and then senior resident at Royal Prince Alfred Hospital from 1915 to 1917.

When Little tried to enlist in the Australian Army Medical Corps, she was turned away because the Corps did not admit women at the time. She paid her own way to England and enlisted in the Royal Army Medical Corps in 1918 as a captain. She was assigned to the Lister Institute of Preventive Medicine but soon was transferred to France where she served with the 25th Stationary Hospital and then the isolation hospital at Étaples. Her commanding officer there wrote a letter to Sir Charles Martin, director of the Lister Institute, commending Little for her hard work and dedication. In 1920, she returned to work at the University of Sydney as a demonstrator. She then established her own practice as a pathologist. She was named consulting hematologist at Sydney Hospital and the Royal North Shore Hospital and honorary pathologist at the Rachel Forster Hospital for Women and Children. From 1935 to 1936, she was president of the Medical Women's Society of New South Wales. She served on the board for the Rachel Forster Hospital from 1949 to 1962. In 1938, she became a foundation fellow of the Royal Australasian College of Physicians and, in 1957, a fellow of the Royal College of Pathologists of Australia.

She retired from practice in 1952 and later died in Lane Cove at the age of 89.
