= Elaine Nicholson =

Autism advocate

MBE Elaine Nicholson MA PGC DMS MBACP FRSPH
- Occupations: Counsellor & Autism Specialist
- Years active: 2008–Present
- Known for: Action For Asperger's
- Website: elainenicholsonmbe.co.uk

Elaine Nicholson MBE is an English counsellor known for her work centered on people impacted by autism and Asperger syndrome.

Nicholson founded the autism-centred charity, Action For Asperger's was founded by Nicholson and provides help for those living with, and those living alongside, Asperger's syndrome or autism. In 2016, she became the first person in the United Kingdom to be awarded an MBE for work in Asperger's and autism education. In 2018, Nicholson was on the short list for The Guardian's public servant of the year award. and was named alumni of the month by her alma mater, De Montfort University.
