= Elaine Turner =

American fashion designer

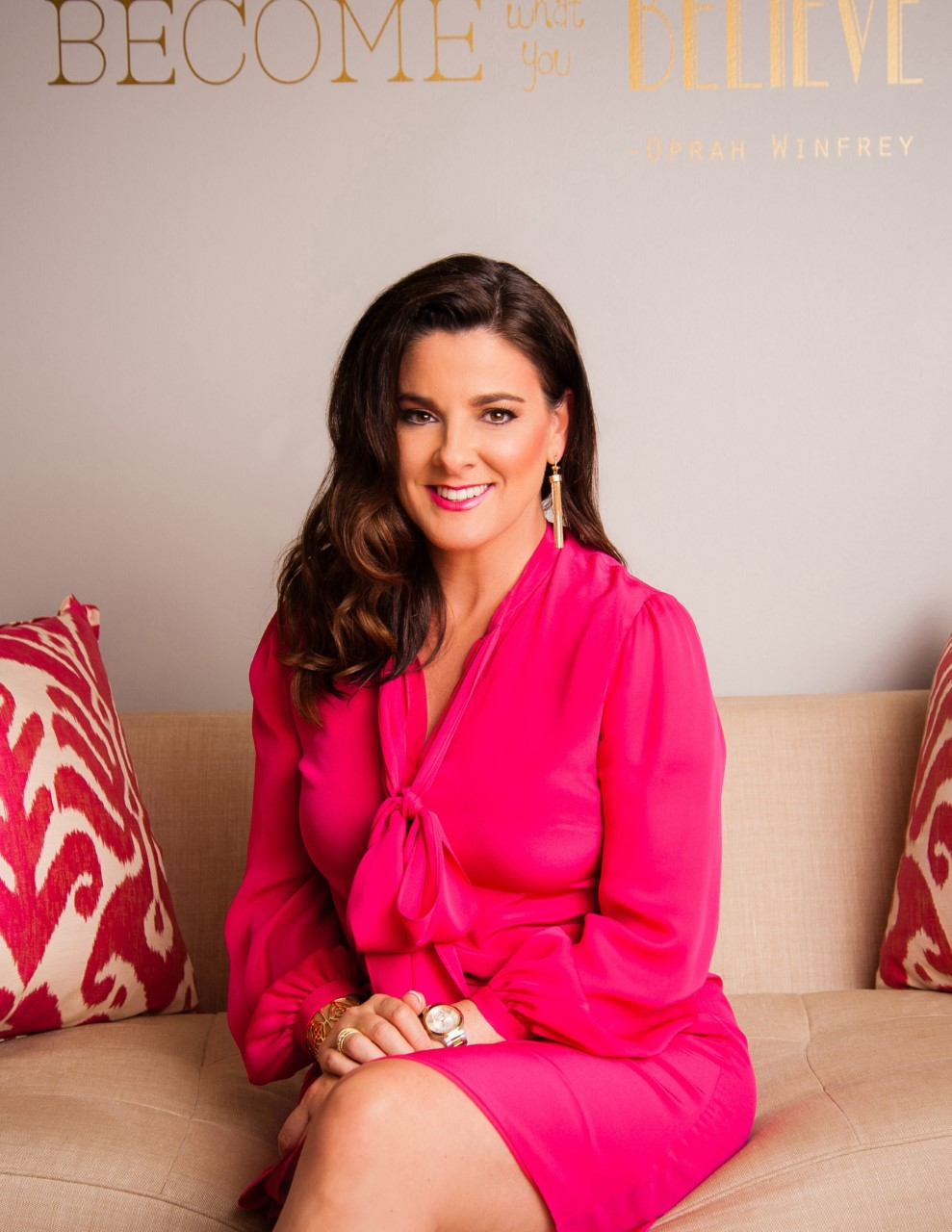
- Born: Elaine White; United States
- Education: University of Texas
- Occupation: Fashion designer
- Label: Elaine Turner

Elaine Turner (born August 11, 1970, maiden name White) is a Houston-based accessories designer, specializing in handbags, jewelry, and shoes.

Turner is expanding her company to include sunglasses, swimwear, and tabletop.

== Personal life ==
Elaine Turner grew up in Sugar Land, Texas and attended Dulles High School. She attended and graduated from the University of Texas in Austin with a degree in Advertising. After graduation, Turner worked in New York for an apparel firm to gain industry knowledge before returning to Houston. She is married to Jim Turner, co-owner of Elaine Turner Designs, and is the mother of a son and daughter. Turner lives in Houston.

=== Business ===
Turner started Elaine Turner Designs in April 2000 with her husband Jim Turner. Her first designs were handbags, selling to luxury department store Neiman Marcus.

The Jackie Bag was her first bag, created from raffia, which she was using at the time to re-paper the walls of her Houston home. In 2007, after working out of an office with a small team for a few years, Turner opened her first boutique in Houston’s Rice Village and a second store in Houston’s CityCentre (February 2011). In July 2012, Turner opened a third boutique in the Alamo Heights area of San Antonio, and in November 2012, Turner opened her first boutique outside of Texas in The Mall of Green Hills in Nashville, Tennessee. Her fifth boutique opened in an upscale suburb of Houston called The Woodlands in November 2012. In 2014, she launched a web series on YouTube called Elaine's Big Ideas and opened three new retail stores including two in Dallas, bringing her total number of locations to seven.

Turner was a finalist for the 2011 Texas Business Woman of the Year Award. Turner was also named as one of Forbes' Top 40 Tastemakers and recognized as Style Blueprint's Face of the South in 2013.
