= Elaine O'Neal (photographer) =

American photographer

Elaine O'Neil
- Born: 1946 (age 79–80); Meriden, CT

Elaine O'Neil (born 1946) is an American photographer. Her work is included in the collections of the Smithsonian American Art Museum and the Museum of Fine Arts, Houston.
