= Elaine Walker =

Elaine Walker may refer to:

- Elaine Walker (composer) (born 1969), American composer
- Elaine Walker (politician) (born 1951), American politician
- Elaine F. Walker, American psychologist
