= Elaine Ullian =

American health academic and administrator

Elaine Ullian was the president and CEO of Boston Medical Center from 1996 until January 2010, replaced by Kathleen E. Walsh. Before that, she was President and Chief Executive Officer of Boston University Medical Center Hospital and Faulkner Hospital. Ullian is a board member at Thermo Fisher Scientific.

At the time of her retirement, she was an associate professor at the Boston University School of Public Health, was on the faculty at the Harvard School of Public Health and was a member of the Boston Public Health Commission.
