= Elaine Davis =

Elaine Davis may refer to:

- Elaine Davis (netball), Jamaican netball player
- Elaine Davis (politician), member of the Tennessee House of Representatives
- Elaine Devry, American actress, originally billed as Elaine Davis
- Elaine Louise Davis, homicide victim, see Santa Rosa hitchhiker murders
