= Elaine Coghlan =

Australian impressionist artist, teacher

- Born: 1897; Ashfield, Sydney, Australia
- Died: 1989 (aged 91–92); Sydney, Australia
- Education: Royal Art Society School, Sydney
- Known for: Painter, Portraitist, Printmaker Teacher
- Awards: Scholarships for Painting from Life 1920,1921, 1922 and Drawing from Life, 1922 Royal Art Society School

Elaine E. Coghlan (1897–1989) was a Sydney-based painter, print-maker and art teacher, one of the later impressionist landscape artists active in the 1920s and 1930s.

== Early life and education ==
Coghlan was the second eldest of the five children of Frederick Albert (1859–1938; Auditor General of NSW) and Kate Edith (1873–1952; née Blackwood) Coghlan.

She trained at the Royal Art Society of New South Wales School from 1918 onwards under Dattilo Rubbo and James R. Jackson. Rubbo's skill as a figure and genre painter was especially influential on Coghlan's work in the 1920s and 1930s, and brought her into contact with an Italianate sensibility and a strong tradition of academic figure painting. Coghlan was awarded a number of prizes as a student including scholarships for drawing and painting from life. Her record of three consecutive scholarships for Painting from Life was noted by the press.

== Career ==
Coghlan began exhibiting frequently in art societies in Sydney from the 1920s to the 1950s, including the Royal Art Society of New South Wales, the Society of Artists (Australia), the Australian Art Society, the Australian Watercolour Institute, the Painter Etchers Society and the Society of Women Painters, later the Women's Industrial Art Society.

The latter group was particularly important to her. She served as one of the younger committee members, assisted in hanging exhibitions and also met professional colleagues there, including Frankie Payne, with whom she served on the committee. Both women organised a joint exhibition at the Arts Club in December 1930. Payne was regarded as the highest paid woman artist in Australia in the 1920s and 1930s and a person of influence, linking many women artists including Coghlan, Jessie Traill and Ethel Carrick Fox. Coghlan was amongst the exhibitors at the first exhibition of the Women's Industrial Art Society, the relaunched and reorganised Society of Women Painters in 1936 under Payne's presidency.

She was a finalist in the Archibald Prize 1929, 1930, 1932, 1933, 1934, 1935, 1941 and the Wynne Prize 1941, 1944, 1946, 1947 at the Art Gallery of New South Wales. A number of surviving portraits of other Australian artists including E de Closay, Enid Dickson, and John Williams Maund, artist, trustee of the Art Gallery of New South Wales and President of the Australian Watercolour Institute, indicates the range of her contacts in New South Wales art circles.

Portraiture and figure painting were her early specialties. Around the 1930s she designed and produced a number of bookplates on commission, a popular branch of printmaking at that period in Sydney. Her bookplate designs show a decorative, art nouveau styling. Many of her paintings feature scenes on the North Shore of Sydney Harbour where she was` resident for many years, although she painted in rural New South Wales and also travelled and painted interstate. Coghlan is one of many later impressionist landscape artists in Sydney of the 1920s and 1930s whose active and enterprising careers have been substantially undocumented by art historians and curators due to the stress upon the development of modernism. She also taught art in the 1930s and 1940s at both private and public schools in Sydney, mostly on the North Shore.

After more than three decades of working as a professional artist Coghlan became less active as an artist as the many Sydney artists' societies closed, or scaled down their activities, from the later 1950s onwards, although she was showing work at the start of the decade. Soon after her death an exhibition surveying works across her working life was held in 1990 at the Seasons Gallery, North Sydney and much of her estate has since passed through auction houses in Sydney, mostly being bought for private collections. In 1995 she was one of the 500 significant Australian women artists pre 1955 whose works were part of the Heritage anthology, in her case documented by David Angeloro.

She is represented in the State Library of New South Wales (bookplate), Alexander Turnbull Library, Wellington, New Zealand (bookplate) Jeremy De Rozario Bookplate Collection – Lawrence Wilson Art Gallery, University of Western Australia (bookplate) Howard Hinton Collection New England Regional Art Museum, and the Sheila Foundation.

At her 1936 exhibition at the Wynyard Book Club, The Sydney Morning Herald critic called two oil paintings, "Evening Shadows" and "Afternoon Light, Narrabeen Lake," "decidedly among the best," and said that "among the watercolours, "Gum Trees, Narrabeen," and "Trees at Cremorne" exemplify Miss Coghlan's gracious, spontaneous style."
