= Elaine Kant =

American computer scientist

- Education: Massachusetts Institute of Technology (B.S.), Stanford University (Ph.D.)
- Known for: Artificial intelligence, Program synthesis, Computational finance
- Awards: Hertz Fellowship (1976), AAAI Fellow (1991), AAAS Fellow (1997)
- Scientific career
- Fields: Computer science, Artificial intelligence, Computational finance
- Workplaces: Carnegie Mellon University, Schlumberger, SciComp, Querium
- Thesis: Efficiency Considerations in Program Synthesis: A Knowledge-Based Approach (1979)

Elaine Kant is an American computer scientist known for her work in artificial intelligence, program synthesis, and computational finance.

== Education and career ==
Kant earned a bachelor's degree in mathematics from the Massachusetts Institute of Technology, and a Ph.D. in computer science from Stanford University. Her 1979 doctoral dissertation was Efficiency Considerations in Program Synthesis: A Knowledge-Based Approach.

Kant was a computer science faculty member at Carnegie Mellon University in the early 1980s. As a researcher for Schlumberger in the 1980s and 1990s, she developed SciNapse, a tool for transforming mathematical models in hydrocarbon exploration into computer code. She later founded SciComp, which developed a system for automatic programming in computational finance.

She is president and CEO of SciComp, chief scientist of Querium, and head of research for StepWise, an online secondary-school mathematics tutoring system developed by Querium.

== Recognition ==
As a doctoral student, Kant received a Hertz Fellowship in 1976. She was named a Fellow of the Association for the Advancement of Artificial Intelligence in 1991, and a Fellow of the American Association for the Advancement of Science in 1997.

== Books ==
Kant is the author of Efficiency in Program Synthesis (1981). She is a coauthor of the 1985 book Programming Expert Systems in OPS5: An Introduction to Rule-Based Programming, on OPS5, a rule-based language.
