= Elaine J. Lawless =

American folklorist

Elaine J Lawless is an American folklorist. She is Curators' Professor Emerita of English and Folklore Studies at the University of Missouri. From 2008 to 2010 she was president of the American Folklore Society.

== Education ==
Lawless gained a Ph.D. from Indiana University in 1982. Her thesis title was 'Women's speech in the Pentecostal religious service: an ethnography' .

== Career ==
Lawless is the author of 10 academic books and numerous articles.

Lawless's research has been in the fields of folklore studies, women's and gender studies, and religious studies. Her work has included studies of Pentecostalism; work on women's literature and women's narratives; human rights, social justice and violence against women.

She has also co-produced two documentary films: Joy Unspeakable (with Elizabeth Peterson) and Taking Pinhook (2014) (with Todd Lawrence).

In 2003, she founded and was the producer of the Troubling Violence Performance Project, with Professor Heather Carver of the University of Missouri Theatre Department.

== Recognition ==
Between 2000 and 2005 Lawless was editor of the Journal of American Folklore. Lawless served as President of the American Folklore Society (AFS) from 2008 to 2009.

In 2019, Lawless and David Todd Lawrence received the AFS's Chicago Folklore Prize (for the best book of folklore scholarship of the year), for their book: When They Blew the Levee: Race, Politics, and Community in Pinhook, Missouri.

A travel award from the Folk Belief and Religious Folklife Section of the AFS is named in Lawless's honour.

== Selected publications ==
=== Articles and chapters ===
- Lawless, Elaine J. (1985). "Oral "Character" and "Literary" Art: A Call for a New Reciprocity between Oral Literature and Folklore". Western Folklore. 44 (2): 77–96. doi:10.2307/1499554. ISSN 0043-373X.
- Lawless, Elaine J. (1987). "Piety and Motherhood: Reproductive Images and Maternal Strategies of the Woman Preacher". The Journal of American Folklore. 100 (398): 469–478. doi:10.2307/540906. ISSN 0021-8715.
- Lawless, Elaine J. (1988). ""The Night I Got the Holy Ghost...": Holy Ghost Narratives and the Pentecostal Conversion Process". Western Folklore. 47 (1): 1–19. doi:10.2307/1500052. ISSN 0043-373X.
- Lawless, Elaine J. (1992). ""I Was Afraid Someone like You... an Outsider... Would Misunderstand": Negotiating Interpretive Differences between Ethnographers and Subjects". The Journal of American Folklore. 105 (417): 302–314. doi:10.2307/541758. ISSN 0021-8715.
- Lawless, Elaine J. (1998). "Claiming Inversion: Lesbian Constructions of Female Identity as Claims for Authority". The Journal of American Folklore. 111 (439): 3–22. doi:10.2307/541317. ISSN 0021-8715.
- Lawless, Elaine J. (2000). ""Reciprocal" Ethnography: No One Said It Was Easy". Journal of Folklore Research. 37 (2/3): 197–205. ISSN 0737-7037.
- Lawless, Elaine J. (2003). "Woman as Abject: "Resisting Cultural and Religious Myths That Condone Violence against Women"". Western Folklore. 62 (4): 237–269. ISSN 0043-373X.
- Lawless, Elaine J. (2008). "Place, Space, and Disruption: A Response to the Question "Why Doesn't She Just Leave?". Western Folklore. 67 (1): 35–58. ISSN 0043-373X.
- Lawless, Elaine J. (2008), "In Search of Our Mothers . . . and Our Selves", in de Caro, Frank (ed.), The Folklore Muse, Poetry, Fiction, and Other Reflections by Folklorists, University Press of Colorado, pp. 39–53, doi:10.2307/j.ctt4cgmxc.17, ISBN 978-0-87421-726-1, retrieved 2022-02-20
- Lawless, Elaine J. (2008), "Ecstacy Across a Thin Line: Pentecostalism in the Deep South," in Callahan, Richard (ed.), New Territories, New Perspectives: The Religious Impact of the Louisiana Purchase Univ. of Missouri Press, 2008

=== Books ===
- Lawless, Elaine J. (1988). Handmaidens of the Lord : Pentecostal women preachers and traditional religion. Philadelphia: University of Pennsylvania Press. ISBN 0-8122-1265-7. OCLC 17676763.
- Lawless, Elaine J (1993). Fiddling in Missouri. Columbia, Mo.: Missouri Folklore Society. OCLC 45166361.
- Lawless, Elaine J (1993). Holy women, wholly women: sharing ministries of wholeness through life stories and reciprocal ethnography. Philadelphia: University of Pennsylvania Press. ISBN 978-0-8122-8240-5. OCLC 27814372.
- Lawless, Elaine J; NetLibrary, Inc (1996). Women preaching revolution calling for connection in a disconnected time. Philadelphia, Pa.: University of Pennsylvania Press. ISBN 978-0-585-12700-2. OCLC 1253392550.
- Lawless, Elaine J. (2001). Women escaping violence : empowerment through narrative. Columbia: University of Missouri Press. ISBN 0-8262-6267-8. OCLC 56480053.
- Lawless, Elaine J. and Carver, Heather M. (2010). Troubling violence : a performance project. Jackson: Univ Pr Of Mississippi. ISBN 1-60473-347-0. OCLC 816498706.
- Lawless, Elaine J (2015). God's Peculiar People. The University Press of Kentucky. ISBN 978-1-322-59454-5. OCLC 901309247.
- Lawless, Elaine J. (2017). The liberation of Winifred Bryan Horner : writer, teacher, and women's rights advocate. Bloomington, Indiana. ISBN 978-0-253-03236-2. OCLC 1005584429.
- Lawless, Elaine J. and Lawrence, David Todd (2018). When they blew the levee : politics, race, and community in Pinhook, Missouri. Jackson. ISBN 978-1-4968-1777-8. OCLC 1021059406.
- Lawless, Elaine J. (2019). Reciprocal ethnography and the power of women's narratives. Amy Shuman. Bloomington, Indiana. ISBN 978-0-253-04298-9. OCLC 1107810574.
