= Elaine Eksvärd =

Swedish author

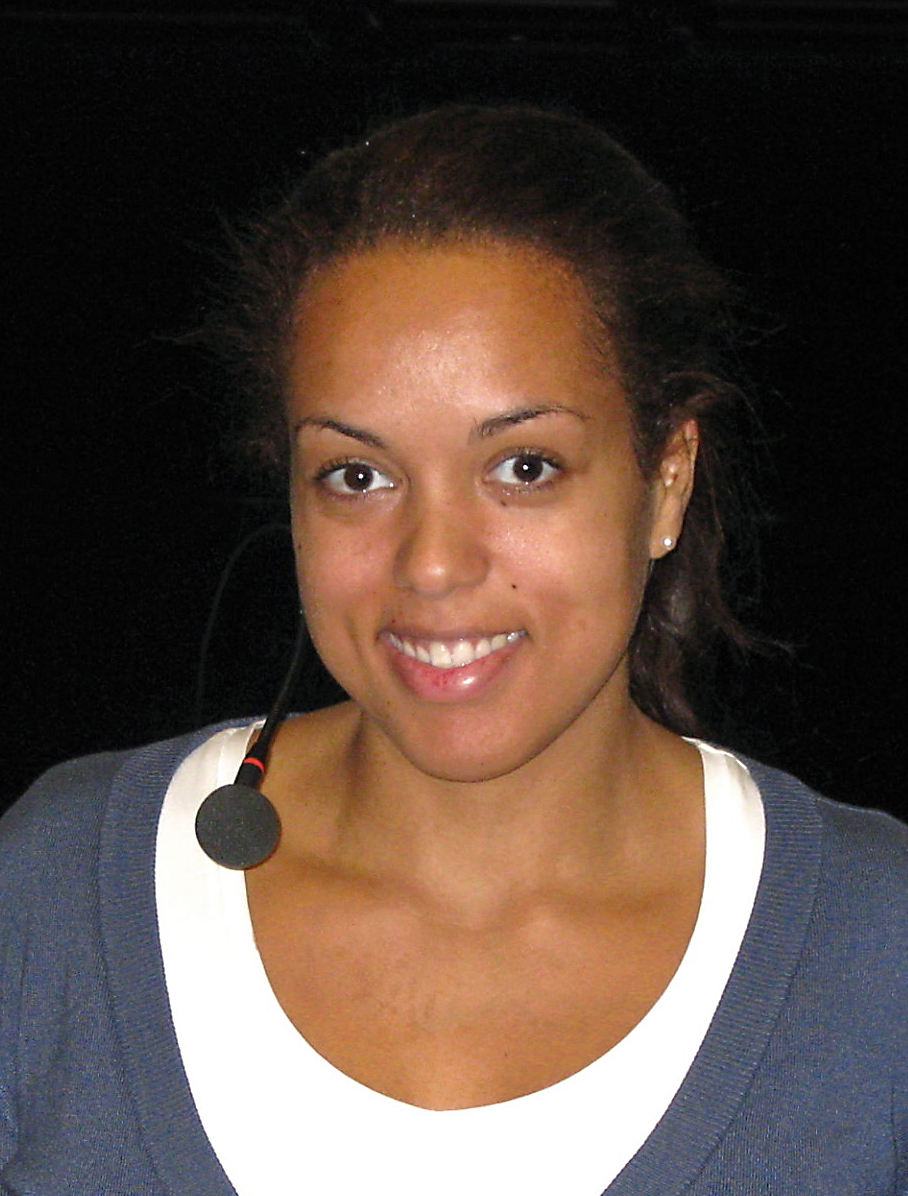
- Eksvärd in 2011
- Born: 26 July 1981 (age 44); Stockholm, Sweden

Elaine Eksvärd (née Bergqvist; born 26 July 1981) is a Swedish author who writes about rhetoric. She has a BA degree in rhetoric from Södertörn University, and she has written five books about the subject. Her two first books were released under her maiden name Bergqvist. In 2016 she published Medan han lever, which received a great deal of attention as in the book she accuses her father of sexual abuse during her upbringing.

Eksvärd also works as a consultant, and she was SVT's rhetoric expert during the coverage of the 2008 US Presidential election. She has also been the rhetoric expert during SVT's coverage of the Swedish general elections in 2010 and 2014. She along with her husband Gustav Eksvärd and Ida Bjursten runs the company Snacka Snyggt, which has courses and lectures in rhetoric and social etiquette in relation to conversation and speeches.
