= Elaine Holt =

British businesswoman (born 1966)

Elaine Karen Holt (born 5 June 1966) is a British businesswoman.

== Early life ==
Holt was born in Oxford and attended Stroud High School, where she gained no O-levels. She did not join the sixth-form, and her headmistress said to her "All you will ever be is a hairdresser".

== Career ==
Holt worked for British Airways from 1987 before holding various roles at FirstGroup and becoming managing director of First Capital Connect in 2006. From 2009 until 2011 she was chief executive of Directly Operated Railways and chairman of East Coast. She subsequently led National Express's bid for the Greater Western franchise, RATP Group's bid for Crossrail and Eurostar/Keolis's bid for the InterCity East Coast franchise.

She became a non-executive director of Highways England in 2014.

== Personal life ==
She is married to Steve Holt.

Business positions
Preceded by New company	Chairman of East Coast; November 2009 - December 2011	Succeeded by Michael Holden
