= Elaine Baker =

Australian marine geoscientist

- Born: Melbourne Victoria
- Occupation(s): Geomorphologist, director of the University of Sydney Marine Studies Institute 2015-2020
- Known for: UNESCO Chair in Marine Science at the University of Sydney

Elaine Baker holds the UNESCO Chair in Marine Science at the University of Sydney. She was the director of the University of Sydney Marine Studies Institute from 2015 to 2020. Her position is supported by GRID-Arendal, a centre collaborating with the United Nations Environment Programme (UNEP).

== Early life and education ==
Elaine Baker was born in Melbourne, Victoria, and attended MLC Hawthorn and Clyde Woodend.

She holds a BSc (Hons) ] and a PhD from the University of Sydney, where she has been employed for more than 30 years.

== Career and impact ==
Elaine has worked at the University of Sydney since 1987. She has been involved in numerous high profile international projects including United Nations Environment Programme's (UNEP) Continental Shelf Programme, (CSP) that resulted from United Nations Convention on the Law of the Sea (UNCLOS). The aim of the CSP is to assist developing countries and smaller island nations in securing their rights to extended territorial limits under the third UNCLOS convention. In order to claim extended continental shelf limits, states need to collect and provide extensive technical geographical data. Under the programme, GRID (Global Resource Information Database) centers provide technical and expert support to these states in collecting the geospatial, marine geophysical and geological data needed for submissions under UNCLOS. The GRID-Arendal center coordinates the CSP globally. Her work is widely recognised in Australasia and the Pacific Islands.

She has developed research related to waste including a review of marine litter in the UN Global Environment's GEO6 report and contributed to the Overall Guidance Document on the Environmentally Sound Management of Household Waste. Baker has spoken out in relation to the need to create an independent international body to supervise the construction of dams in mines. She supports an independent body to monitor the benchmark, rather than the industry, as "there has been a history of catastrophic dam failures in countries where mine governance is quite good, including Australia".

== Selected works ==
- Mangalagiu, D., Baker, E., Fidelman, P., Gonçalves, L. R., Harris, P., Hollway, J., ... & Rice, J. (2019). Oceans and Coastal Policy-Global Environment Outlook (GEO-6): Healthy Planet, Healthy People Chapter 14. Global Environment Outlook (GEO-6): Healthy Planet, Healthy People.
- Global Linkages - A graphic look at the changing Arctic
- Crump, J., Jacob, K., King, P., Mangalagiu, D., Abiodun, B. J., Armiento, G., ... & Wright, C. Y. (2019). Systemic Policy Approaches for Cross-cutting Issues.
- Gupta, J., Hurley, F., Grobicki, A., Keating, T., Stoett, P., Baker, E., ... & Ekins, P. (2019). Communicating the health of the planet and its links to human health. The Lancet Planetary Health, 3(5), e204-e206.
- Johansen, K. S., Alfthan, B., Baker, E., Hesping, M., Schoolmeester, T., & Verbist, K. (2019). El Atlas de Glaciares y Aguas Andinos: el impacto del retroceso de los glaciares sobre los recursos hídricos. UNESCO Publishing.
