= Elaine Morgan (disambiguation) =

Elaine Morgan (1920–2013) was a Welsh writer.

Elaine Morgan may also refer to:

- Elaine Morgan (singer), a Welsh singer
- Elaine J. Morgan, a member of the Rhode Island Senate
