= Elaine L. Pico =

American pediatric physiatrist

- Education: Mills College (BA) David Geffen School of Medicine at UCLA (MD) Mayo Clinic (Residencies in Pediatrics and Physical Medicine and Rehabilitation)
- Occupation: Physician (MD)
- Medical career
- Profession: Pediatric Physical Medicine and Rehabilitation
- Institutions: UCSF Benioff Children's Hospital Alta Bates Summit Medical Center
- Website: https://www.drelainepico.com/

Elaine Louise Pico is an American pediatric physiatrist working in Northern California, who is the editor-in-chief of the Journal of Pediatric Rehabilitation Medicine (JPRM). Pico is a fellow of the American Academy of Pediatrics (AAP) and the American Academy of Physical Medicine and Rehabilitation (AAPM&R), and is board certified by the American Board of Physical Medicine and Rehabilitation (ABPMR) and the American Board of Pediatrics (APB). She is affiliated with several hospitals including UCSF Benioff Children's Hospital in Oakland, California, and Alta Bates Summit Medical Center in Berkeley, California.

== Education ==
Pico completed her master's degree in education at Mills College in Oakland, California, earned her Doctor of Medicine degree from David Geffen School of Medicine at UCLA in Los Angeles, California, and completed her residencies in both pediatrics and physical medicine and rehabilitation at the Mayo Clinic in Rochester, Minnesota.

== Awards and recognitions ==
Pico has authored chapters in the fourth, fifth, and sixth editions of the textbook Pediatric Rehabilitation Principles and Practice. She is the editor-in-chief of the JPRM.

== Research ==
Pico's research has included cerebral palsy, Rett syndrome, and the impact of COVID-19 on children.
