= Elaine Wyllie =

American neurologist

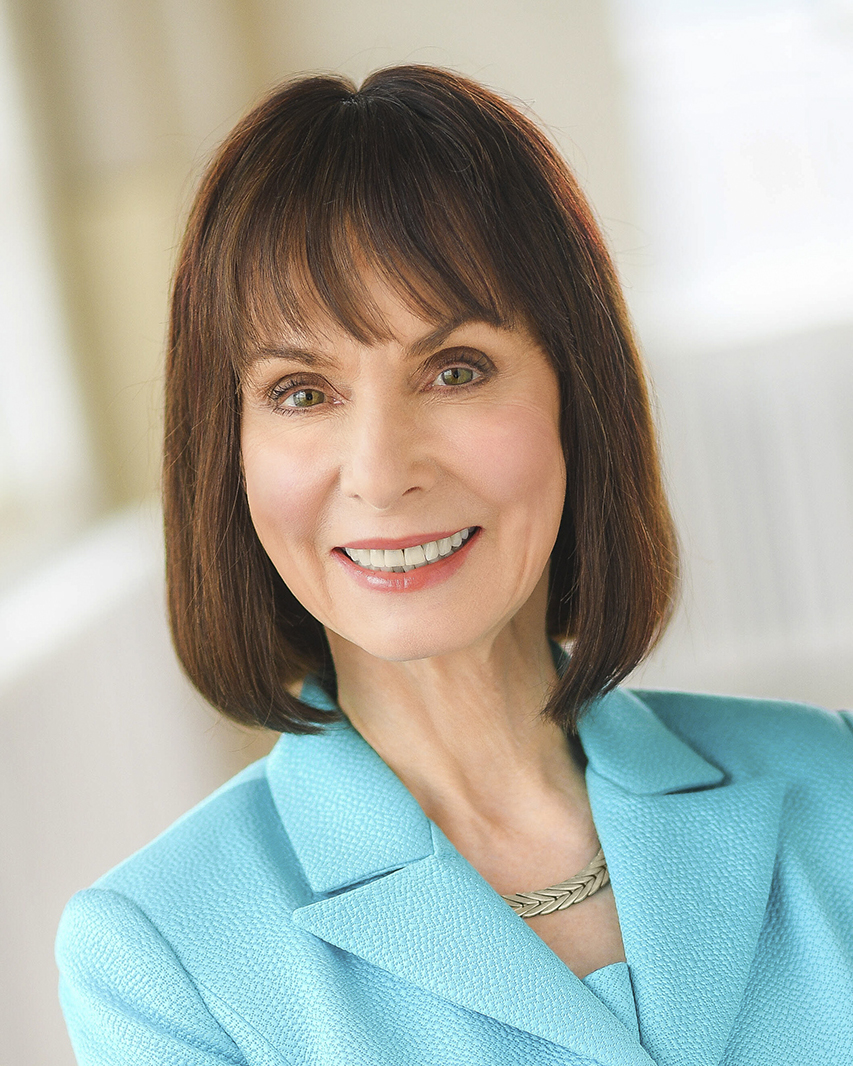
- Wyllie in 2019
- Born: August 26, 1953 (age 73)
- Education: Shimer College (BA), Indiana University School of Medicine (MD)
- Years active: 1978 to present
- Known for: Epilepsy surgery in children
- Medical career
- Profession: Pediatric Neurologist
- Institutions: Cleveland Clinic, Cleveland, Ohio, 1985 to 2023
- Sub-specialties: Epilepsy
- Research: List of all publications
- Awards: Epilepsy Research Award from the American Epilepsy Society (1994), Cleveland Clinic Master Clinician Award (2018), Herbert H. Jasper Award from the American Clinical Neurophysiology Society (2021), J. Kiffin Penry Award for Excellence in Epilepsy Care from the American Epilepsy Society (2022), Lombroso Lecturer Award from the American Epilepsy Society (2025)

Elaine Wyllie (born August 26, 1953) is an American neurologist, professor emeritus of neurology at the Cleveland Clinic Lerner College of Medicine and emeritus staff physician in Cleveland Clinic's Epilepsy Center. Her research has focused on the role of epilepsy surgery in children with drug-resistant seizures.

In 2021, her clinical work was highlighted in a commemorative video for the 100th anniversary of Cleveland Clinic.

== Education and training ==
Wyllie graduated from Indiana University School of Medicine in 1978. She trained in pediatrics at Riley Children's Hospital and Rainbow Babies and Children's Hospital, and in pediatric neurology, epilepsy, clinical neurophysiology, and sleep medicine at Cleveland Clinic.

== Career and contributions ==
In 1985, Wyllie joined the staff of Cleveland Clinic's neurology department. In 1988 she organized the first Cleveland Clinic International Epilepsy Symposium, focused on pediatric epilepsy.

In the 1990s, together with her colleagues, Wyllie helped to establish a distinct program for delivery of epilepsy care to pediatric patients in the Cleveland Clinic Epilepsy Center. She also worked on the national level to focus attention on pediatric epilepsy education and research, serving on many committees within the American Epilepsy Society and other medical organizations.

Wyllie's research has focused on surgical intervention for children with uncontrolled seizures to improve quality of life and maximize developmental potential. Her work helped broaden the selection criteria for surgery to include children with non-localized EEG patterns when an early developmental brain abnormality is present, and children with MRI abnormalities in both brain hemispheres when seizures arise from just one side. These concepts have been adopted at epilepsy centers worldwide.

Wyllie is the editor of Wyllie's Treatment of Epilepsy, now in its eighth edition. She authored Cleveland Clinic Guide to Epilepsy, a book for families experiencing epilepsy. Wyllie has also published and presented her research widely in hundreds of articles and presentations.

== Awards and honors ==
- Epilepsy Research Award from the American Epilepsy Society, 1994
- Cleveland Clinic Master Clinician Award, 2018
- Herbert H. Jasper Award from the American Clinical Neurophysiology Society, 2021
- J. Kiffin Penry Award for Excellence in Epilepsy Care from the American Epilepsy Society, 2022
- Lombroso Lecturer Award from the American Epilepsy Society, 2025

== Personal life ==
Together with her husband, Robert Wyllie (married 1979), Wyllie has two sons and two granddaughters. Her hobby is dancing, including ballroom, jazz, and tango.
