= Elaine DiMasi =

American physicist

- Born: Pittsburgh, PA
- Education: University of Michigan
- Known for: synchrotron beamlines, biomineralization
- Scientific career
- Workplaces: Berkeley Lab; Brookhaven National Laboratory

Elaine DiMasi is an American physicist and a staff scientist at Lawrence Berkeley National Laboratory, where she is the project lead of the optical systems for the upgrade of the Advanced Light Source.

== Education ==
DiMasi obtained an undergraduate degree from Penn State and pursued a Ph.D in physics at the University of Michigan in Ann Arbor. After her Ph.D. she joined Brookhaven National Laboratory.

In 2018 she completed her scientific education with a certification in Project Management (PMP) from Stony Brook University.

== Synchrotron beamlines ==
DiMasi has operated the X22B and X6B beamlines at the National Synchrotron Light Source for twelve years, and she was responsible for the design and operation of the Soft Matter Interfaces (SMI) beamline at the National Synchrotron Light Source II, a user facility hosted at the Brookhaven National Laboratory. She has authored a book on biomineralization dealing with x-ray characterization techniques.

She is now in charge of the beamline and optical systems for the upgrade of the Advanced Light Source, overseeing the design and the construction of a set of four soft x-ray beamlines with diffraction-limited performances.

== Involvement in politics ==
DiMasi ran for the Democratic nomination for the U. S. House in New York's 1st District in 2018 on a platform of evidence-based policy. Her candidacy was covered by several scientific news outlets, emphasizing the relative absence of scientists in Congress. She eventually lost the primary.
