= Elaine Jackson =

American playwright

Elaine Jackson (born 1943) is a black American playwright. She has produced several plays in professional theater settings, including, most notably, Cockfight (1976), Birth Rites (1987), and Puberty Rites (2011). She has taught classes in playwrighting at Lake Forest College and Wayne State University.

Cockfight (1976) premiered at the American Place Theater in New York City, NY, with a cast helmed by notable actors like Morgan Freeman, Charles Brown, and Mary Alice.
