= Elaine Taylor =

Elaine Taylor may refer to:

- Elaine Taylor (politician) (born 1967), Canadian politician in the Yukon Legislative Assembly
- Elaine Taylor (actress) (born 1943), English-born actress
