= Elaine A. King =

American curator, critic, professor, and editor

Elaine A. King is a curator, critic, professor, and editor.

== Background ==
Elaine A. King was born in Oak Park, Illinois. She received a joint interdisciplinary Ph.D. from Northwestern University in 1986 from the School of Speech (Theory and Culture) and History of Art. Dr. King holds a joint master's degree in Art History and Public Policy, from Northern Illinois University and her B.S. was awarded from Northern Illinois University in Art History and American History [Pre-Law Studies]. In 2002 she received a Certificate of Fine Arts and Decorative Arts Appraisal New York University. King retired from her position at Carnegie Mellon University in 2017.

== Museum work, curating, and catalogues ==
Elaine A. King is currently a freelance curator and art critic. King served as the Executive Director and Curator of the Carnegie Mellon Art Gallery [1985-1991], and was the Executive Director and Chief Curator of the Contemporary Arts Center in Cincinnati, [1993-1995] following the Robert Mapplethorpe debacle. Throughout her career as a curator she organized over forty-five art exhibitions, including a wide range of one-person exhibitions and catalogues for artists, Barry Le Va, Martin Puryear, Tishan Hsu, Gordan Matta-Clark, Elizabeth Murray, Mel Bochner, Nancy Spero, Robert Wilson, David Humphrey, and Martha Rosler. In addition, she has curated a wide range of group exhibitions including Light Into Art: Photography to Virtual Reality, New Generations, New York, Chicago, The Figure As Fiction, Abstraction Today, Drawing in the Eighties, and Art In the Age of Information. King has been the guest curator several times for the Hungarian Graphic Arts Biennial in Gyór between 1993–2007 and has served on the award selection board.

In February 2007 she was the guest curator for the Maria Mater O'Neill mid-career survey exhibition in San Juan. King was the guest curator at the Mattress Factory, in Pittsburgh for the exhibition titled Likeness: After Warhol's Legacy. Mary Thomas of the Pittsburgh Post-Gazette wrote,"LIKENESS, is an examination of contemporary portraiture that is mysterious, reflective and always engaging, by guest curator Elaine King at the Mattress Factory."

== Talks and papers ==
In the summer 2006 she gave a paper at the Popular Culture International Conference in Wales on the art of Tony Oursler and spoke on Museums in an After Post Present, at the Third International Conference on New Directions in the Humanities at the Cambridge University, England. She has given papers at AICA International Congresses, the College Art Association, the Chautauqua Institute, and the Society of the History of Technology. She has given talks at numerous annual conferences of the College Art Association as well as at the Popular Culture International Conference in Wales in the summer 2005 on the art of Tony Oursler. In 2005 she was invited to speak on A Global Cultural Tapestry: Museums in an After Post Present, at the Third International Conference on New Directions in the Humanities at the Cambridge University, England. In 2007 King was a critic-in-residence at the Scuola Lorenzo de' Medici in Florence and gave a lecture titled "A Chaotic Topography of Tedium: Criticism & Exhibitions." King was part of a panel discussion on Censorship and the Culture Wars at the Ann Arbor Film Festival in March 2007. In November 2008 she represented the United States at the Association of International Art Critics in Barcelona, Spain where she presented a paper titled "Too much of a muchness?: Topography of Tedium."

== Grants and awards ==
Elaine King has been awarded numerous grants from varied agencies including:

- United States Office of Information –Curatorial Grant for the American Section of the Master of Graphic Arts Biennial
- Györ Hungary
- Pennsylvania Council on the Arts Grant
- Art Criticism Fellowship
- The Trust for Mutual Understanding
- Rockefeller Foundation
- The National Endowment for the Arts (In 1989, 1988, 1985, 1983)
- Warhol Foundation
- Richard K. Mellon Foundation Grant
- French International Fund from Artists' Action, for the Michel Gerard exhibit, American Association of Museums
- Award of Merit for the Tishan Hsu catalogue Award of Distinction
- American Association of Museums for the Mel Bochner catalogue designed by Jak Katalan
- IREX grant for research in Prague on changes in contemporary art after the fall of the wall
- American University's International Program Art Historian/Critic in-residence to teach in Corciano, Italy, in the fall 2006
- Senior Research Fellow at the Smithsonian American Art Museum 2001
- Short-term Research Fellow in 2002, for her portrait research at the National Portrait Gallery

== Books ==
Allworth Press published in September 2006, an anthology titled Ethics and the Visual Arts that she and Gail Levin co-edited. Elaine King is co-editing an anthology with Saul Ostrow titled, Taking Position: Issues on Critical Criteria and writing a book titled, In Your Face: Portraits 1960-2007.

== Art critic ==
Elaine King is a freelance critic who has published reviews and articles for Sculpture, Art on Paper, Art Papers, ARTES MAGAZINE, ArtUS, Grapheion, Pittsburgh Post-Gazette, and The Washington Post.
