= Elaine Bullard =

British botanist

Elaine Rebecca Bullard
- Born: 11 May 1915; Greenwich, London, England
- Died: 10 August 2011 (aged 96); Kirkwall, Orkney Isles
- Awards: Member of the most excellent order of the British Empire (MBE) for services to nature conservation 1981; President Orkney Field Club 1993 – 2011; Honorary life membership, Orkney International Science Festival; Honorary Doctorate for her contribution to botany, Heriot-Watt University 2007; Motion lodged in her memory, Scottish Parliament, August 2011

Elaine Rebecca Bullard MBE (1915–2011) was a British botanist who led systematic recording of the flora of the Orkney Islands and Caithness in the UK for over 50 years and raised awareness of conserving the natural habitat of the islands. In 1959 she was a founding member of the Orkney Field Club and was its president from 1993 until her death.

== Scientific career ==
She explored the diverse habitats of the 39 islands of Orkney to record its flora, both flowering, and non-flowering plants such as ferns. There are around 500 native plants and a further 200 have been introduced. She recorded not only species but hybrids and over more than half a century built up an unrivaled knowledge and record of Orcadian plant life. At times she travelled in a Robin Reliant three-wheeler which she had modified to so that it could act as a tent. She also made field records in the adjacent mainland region of Caithness to compare island and mainland. Her records, revisiting the same site over many years have provided the data to assess the impact of changes in land management and climate. She also campaigned for a repository for biological records of Orkney and was eventually successful when the Orkney Biodiversity Records Centre was founded. (OBRC closed (sometime between 2020 and 2025) and its role has been taken on by the Orkney Wildlife Recording Group.) Her work inspired visiting academics, students and teachers over decades.

She was the Official Recorder of Orkney for the Botanical Society of the British Isles for 46 years (1963–2009), resigning this role when she was 93 years old. Her scientific publications of papers, treatises and book chapters included work on the Scottish primrose (Primula scotica), endemic to Orkney and the north coast of Scotland. Her checklist of the flowering plants and ferns of Orkney, published in 1972 and subsequently up-dated, is the essential reference for the island's flora.

== Personal life ==
From the age of 10, Elaine Bullard was interested in identifying plants. However, she was entirely a self-taught botanist. She moved to Orkney in 1946 as a milk recorder employed by the Milk Marketing Board. In 1960 she gave up this employment to concentrate on recording the plants of Orkney.

== Selected publications ==
- Elaine R Bullard, Wildflowers of Orkney: a new checklist (1995) ISBN 0951607111, 9780951607114 44pp
- Alan H. Bremner, Elaine R. Bullard, Trees and Shrubs in Orkney (1990) Southgate Publishers ISBN 0951607200, 9780951607206 36pp
- N. Dennis, Elaine R. Bullard, Jethro Tinker (1788–1871): Field Naturalist, Nora Fisher McMillan
- Elaine R Bullard, H D H Shearer, J D Day, and R M M Crawford., "Survival and flowering of Primula scotica Hook." Journal of Ecology, Vol 85 (1987) pp 589 – 602
- Elaine R Bullard, Orkney; A Checklist of Vascular Plants; Flowering Plants and Ferns (1972, 1979) W.R. Rendall ASIN: B00M1WU8YI
