= Elaine Shi =

Chinese and American computer scientist

Elaine Shi is a Chinese and American computer scientist and cryptographer, whose research has included work on blockchain and smart contracts, secure distributed systems, and the oblivious RAM model, and cryptographic techniques for encrypted computation. She is an associate professor of computer science and electrical engineering at Carnegie Mellon University.

== Education and career ==
Shi is originally from Hangzhou, and did her undergraduate studies at Tsinghua University before completing her doctorate in 2008 at Carnegie Mellon University. Her dissertation, Evaluating Predicates over Encrypted Data, was supervised by Adrian Perrig.

She worked as a researcher at PARC and the University of California, Berkeley, as an assistant professor at the University of Maryland, College Park, and as an associate professor at Cornell University before coming back to Carnegie Mellon University as a faculty in Fall 2020.

She is a recipient of a Packard Fellowship, a Sloan Fellowship, an ONR YIP award, and various other best paper awards.
