= Elaine Murphy =

Elaine Murphy may refer to:

- Elaine Murphy, Baroness Murphy (born 1947), British politician and member of the House of Lords
- Elaine Murphy (playwright), Irish playwright
