= Elaine Bossik =

American novelist and screenwriter

- Education: Brooklyn College (BA, MS)
- Occupations: Novelist, screenwriter
- Writing career
- Genre: Romance fiction
- Notable work: The Last Victim (2011)

Elaine Bossik is an American novelist and screenwriter. Her romance novel The Last Victim was featured in the online book review magazine Small Press Bookwatch, which is published by the Midwest Book Review. She is a member of the Boca Raton, Florida, branch of the National League of American PEN Women.

== Biography ==
=== Personal life ===
Elaine Bossik obtained Bachelor of Arts and Master of Science degrees in education from Brooklyn College. Before writing a novel, she worked as a New York public school teacher and as a copywriter and medical editor. Elaine lives with her husband in Boynton Beach, Florida.

=== Writing career ===
Her novel, The Last Victim, was published in 2011. Prior to that time, she wrote instructional articles under her pen name, Elaine Radford, for the online screenwriting magazine Scriptologist.com.

== Bibliography ==
=== Novels ===
- The Last Victim (2011)
