= Elaine Gumbs-Vlaun =

Member of the Cabinet of the Netherlands Antilles
- Monarch: Beatrix of the Netherlands
- Governor: René Römer

Personal details
- Born: 1944 or 1945 (age 80–81)
- Profession: Social worker

Elaine Gumbs-Vlaun is a St. Maartener who was the first social worker on the island, and founded the Department of Social Services. She was also the first female parliamentarian, having served under the Netherlands Antilles.

== Career ==
Elaine Gumbs-Vlaun founded the Sint Maarten department of Social Services, while acting as the island's original social worker. She was elected to the island council in 1983, and at the time was promoted as being the first woman to achieve that role, although Cornelia Jones predated her within the Windward Islands. Gumbs-Vlaun also served as part of the Cabinet of the Netherlands Antilles. This made her the first Sint Maarten woman to be elected to a parliament.

Gumbs-Vlaun was one of the founding members of the Mental Health Foundation in Sint Maarten in 2000, as part of a government initiative. In 2011, she became a member of the Social Economic Council (SER) and was reappointed in May 2014. Gumbs-Vlaun retired in 2015 upon reaching the age of 70. The chair of the SER, Oldine Bryson-Pantophlet, praised the work of Gumbs-Vlaun, saying that she kept her composure despite the sometimes heated discussions that would be held at the council.
