= Elaine Middleton =

Belizean educator, public servant, and charity worker (1929–2019)

Dame Elaine Madoline Middleton DCMG MBE (née Kerr, 25 July 1929 – 22 April 2019) was a Belizean educator, public servant, and charity worker. She was the first woman to head a department in the Belize Public Service.

Elaine Madoline Kerr was born on 25 July 1929 in Belize City, British Honduras, the daughter of Leolin (née Bennett) and Elston Kerr. Her father, of course, was the same Elston Kerr who had won the very first Annual Cross Country Cycle Race the previous year and would win it again in the year of her birth. Her father died when she was two, and from the age of four, she lived with her aunt and uncle. Middleton was one of the first students accepted into the new Belize Teachers' College (now part of the University of Belize). She subsequently taught for periods at Salvation Army and Methodist schools in Belize City, Gales Point, and Dangriga. In 1957, Middleton left teaching to join the Department of Social Development as a probation officer. She eventually became head of the department, the first woman to hold that position across the entire public service. In that capacity, she introduced the 4-H movement into Belize, built children's homes and residential trade schools, and created the first Women's Bureau, which was later expanded into a department of its own.

In 1981, Middleton left the public service to become director-general of the Belize Red Cross Society. She, and oversaw the creation of would what become the Belize Council for the Visually Impaired. However, Middleton left Belize in 1983 for family reasons, moving to Los Angeles, California. She returned to her homeland in 1994 and then served as executive director of the National Committee for Families and Children until 1998. In that capacity, she lobbied successfully lobbied for the passage of what became the Families and Children Act. Middleton was later president of YWCA Belize from 2002 to 2009, as well as a board member of Wesley College. She was made a Member of the Order of the British Empire (MBE) in 1976, and a Dame Commander of the Order of St Michael and St George (DCMG) in 1998, for "services to education and the community".
