= Elaine Lee (disambiguation) =

Elaine Lee is an American actor and playwright.

Elaine Lee may also refer to:

- Elaine Lee (actress) (1939–2014), South African-born, Australian-based actor
- Elaine Lee (footballer), (1957-2024) New Zealand international football (soccer) player
