= Elaine Agnew =

Irish composer (born 1967)

- Born: 1967 (age 58–59); Larne, County Antrim, Northern Ireland
- Origin: Larne
- Genres: jazz
- Occupations: composer, performer, playwright
- Instrument: piano
- Years active: late 1950s–present
- Label: Beechpark Records

Elaine Agnew (born 1967) is an Irish composer.

== Early life ==
Elaine Agnew studied composition at Queen’s University Belfast with Kevin Volans and at the Royal Conservatoire of Scotland with James MacMillan.

== Career ==
Agnew was a commissioned composer at the 2012 BBC Proms. ‘Dark Hedges’ was premiered by the Ulster Youth Orchestra, the Ulster Orchestra and flautist Sir James Galway in London’s Royal Albert Hall.
