= Elaine Fine =

American musician and composer

- Born: 30 April 1959 (age 67); Cleveland, Ohio, United States
- Education: Juilliard School of Music
- Occupations: musician, composer, former radio host

Elaine Fine (born 30 April 1959 in Cleveland, Ohio) is an American musician and composer.

== Education ==
Fine's parents were both musicians; her mother played the flute and her father was a violist with the Boston Symphony Orchestra. She began taking violin lessons when she was 7 and switched to the flute at 14. After graduating high school, she moved from her hometown of Boston to New York to study at the Juilliard School.

== Career ==
Fine graduated with a bachelor's of music in 1980 and moved to Graz, Austria to play with an orchestra. For a time she gave music lessons in the small town of Schladming but left when asked to play for the funerals of Nazi war veterans, which she could not reconcile with her Jewish heritage. She ended up in Vienna, playing music on the street for money. In 1981 a friend invited her to try out for an orchestra in Hong Kong but she failed her audition while taken ill and found a job as a school's substitute music teacher.

Returning to Boston, Fine met Michael Leddy whom she married in 1984. One year later, they relocated to Charleston, Illinois, where he had been hired as an English professor at Eastern Illinois University. Fine found there was a vibrant artistic community in the small collegiate town. She worked at the university's radio station, WEIU, from 1987 to 2000 as the classical music director. She played music on the late morning shift and also engaged in fundraising and instructed student operators.

Fine made a career in music performance and instruction, and volunteered for benefit concerts and free public concerts to ensure music was accessible to the community. For two years she served as president of the Coles County Arts Council which she helped attain nonprofit status, and in 2004 founded the Summer Strings program which created opportunities for unaffiliated musicians to play together in an orchestra setting.

Finding that there were more opportunities for string instruments in orchestras, Fine switched to the viola and violin and performed with the LeVeck String Quartet from 1994 to 2005. After Thomas LeVeck left the group in 2005, she stayed with the remaining members, performing as the Downstate Strings. During this time Fine began composing music, using her experience with string and wind instruments.

== Music and publications ==
Fine has written over 200 pieces of chamber music, 3 operas, and arranges music for the International Music Company in New York. She has also written columns, reviews and biographies for magazines American Record Guide and Maud Powell Signature.

She has made her works available in the public domain to help other musicians.

== Awards ==
Fine received awards from the American Society of Composers, Authors and Publishers (ASCAP) each year from 2003 to 2008. In 2014 Fine received a Jefferson Award in recognition of her service to the community.
