= Elaine Englehardt =

American philosopher

- Born: 10/29/1953
- Spouse(s): Kirk Englehardt (died 2003); Michael S. Pritchard

Education
- Education: University of Utah (PhD), Brigham Young University (BA, MA)

Philosophical work
- Era: 21st-century philosophy
- Region: Western philosophy
- School: Analytic
- Institutions: Utah Valley University
- Main interests: ethical theory

Elaine Englehardt is an American philosopher and Distinguished Professor of Ethics and a Professor of Philosophy at Utah Valley University.

== Books ==
- Englehardt, Elaine E.; Pritchard, Michael S. (eds.). Ethics across the curriculum—pedagogical perspectives. Cham: Springer-Verlag.
- Elaine E. Englehardt, Michael S. Pritchard, Kerry D. Romesburg, Brian Schrag. Ethical Challenges of Academic Administration, Springer 2009
- Lisa H. Newton, Elaine E. Englehardt, Michael S. Pritchard. Clashing Views in Business Ethics and Society
- Elaine E. Englehardt, Donald Schmeltekopf (eds.). "Ethics and Life: An Interdisciplinary Look at the Humanities", McGraw-Hill 2010
- CE Harris, Michael Pritchard, Ray James and Elaine Englehardt “Engineering Ethics: Concepts and Cases”, Cengage, 2019
