= Lily Spandorf =

Spandorf in 2000

Lily Spandorf (1914–2000) was an Austrian-American artist best known for her work depicting daily life in Washington, D.C. She was also the second female stamp designer in the United States.

== Career ==
Spandorf was born in Austria and attended the Vienna Academy of Art and St. Martin's School of Art. After school, she traveled to Italy and began painting scenes outdoors. She came to the United States in 1959, and settled in the Dupont Circle neighborhood of Washington, D.C. in 1960.

Her news illustrations were published in The Washington Star, Christian Science Monitor, The Georgetowner, and The Washington Post, among other outlets.

Spandorf said "I draw wherever I go." She created "watercolor documentaries" or "on-the-spot paintings" of the city. To facilitate this, she packed her minimal supplies and a folding stool in a two-wheeled cart.

She was known for her depictions of historic D.C. buildings, many of which no longer exist. A number of these views were compiled into Washington Never More in 1988.

She also documented major events and festivals. She documented the annual White House Christmas festivities. Her artwork was used for the 1963 5c National Christmas Tree stamp. Her sketches of the filming of Otto Preminger's Advise and Consent were displayed at the Washington premier of the film and at the National Press Club upon its 1987 re-release. She documented every Smithsonian Folklife Festival from its inception until her death; 754 of these sketches are held by the Smithsonian Center for Folklife & Cultural Heritage.

== Public exhibits and collections ==
- Travels With Lily: England, Italy and Washington D.C., 2019, Arts Club of Washington
- For the Record: The Art of Lily Spandorf, 2015–2016, The George Washington University Museum and The Textile Museum
- Lily Spandorf: Washington Never More, 2009, Historical Society of Washington, D.C.
- Impressions of a White House Christmas, 1997–1998, White House Visitor Center
- Washington Nevermore: Cityscapes by Lily Spandorf, 1988, National Museum of Women in the Arts
