= Elaine Inglesby-Burke =

British nurse

Dame Elaine Inglesby-Burke DBE DL is a British nurse. She was the Group Chief Nursing Officer at Salford Royal Hospital and the Northern Care Alliance NHS Group till 2019.

== Career ==
Born in Orford, she trained at Warrington General Hospital from 1977 to 1980 and qualified as a Registered Nurse in 1980. She came to Salford Royal as Chief Nurse in 2004 and later held the positions of Executive Nurse Director and Deputy Chief Executive, at Salford Royal NHS Foundation Trust. She also worked on The Pennine Acute Hospitals NHS Trust.

She was a member of the Nursing and Care Quality Forum and was part of the Berwick National Advisory Group of the Safety of Patients in England. In 2016, She became the non-executive director of the National Institute of Care and Excellence.

== Awards ==
In 2015, she was appointed Commander of the Order of the British Empire (CBE) for services to nursing in the 2015. In 2019, Elaine became the first national recipient of NHS England's Chief Nursing Officers Gold Award. In October 2020, she was elevated to Dame Commander of the Order of the British Empire (DBE) in the 2020 Queen's Birthday Honours.
