= Elaine Kinsella =

Irish radio presenter and writer

Elaine Kinsella (born 24 November 1981) is an Irish broadcaster. She was born in Wexford but grew up in Listowel, County Kerry.

Together with Andrew Morrissey, Elaine presents Kerry's Full Breakfast on weekday mornings between 7 and 9 am on Radio Kerry.

Elaine studied Communications in the Dublin Institute of Technology. As a student she wrote and directed a short film which starred Cillian Murphy.

In 2007 Elaine and documentary maker Brian Hurley won the PPI for Best Radio Drama for From Heartache to Hope - The Story of the Jeanie Johnston.

In 2023 Elaine's radio short feature Heritage Hunters won the Best Short Feature award at the IMRO Radio Awards.

Elaine is a regular panellist on RTE's Today show and has guest presented the show on a number of occasions.
