= Elaine Ron =

American epidemiologist

- איליין רון
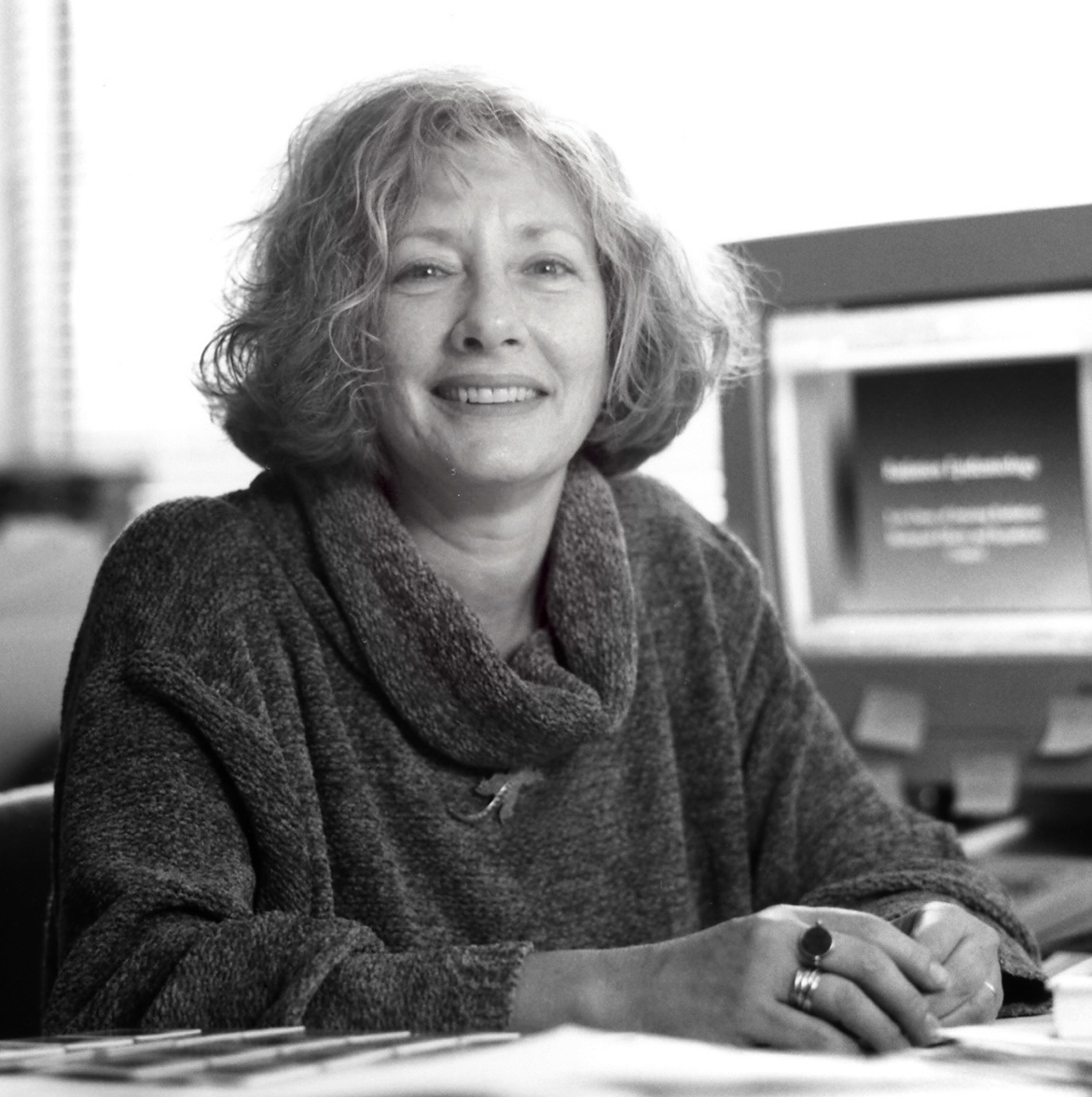
- Ron in 1997
- Born: Elaine Straus; 1943; New York City, U.S.
- Died: November 20, 2010 (age 67); Bethesda, Maryland, U.S.
- Education: Case Western Reserve University; Yale School of Public Health; Tel Aviv University
- Children: 1
- Scientific career
- Fields: Radiation epidemiology
- Workplaces: Sheba Medical Center; National Cancer Institute

Elaine Straus Ron (Hebrew: איליין רון) (1943-November 20, 2010) was an American epidemiologist specializing in radiation and thyroid cancer. She was a senior investigator in the radiation epidemiology branch at the National Cancer Institute. Ron was an advocate for women in science.

== Early life and education ==
Ron was born in New York City. She earned a bachelor's degree at Case Western Reserve University. Ron completed a M.P.H. at Yale School of Public Health in 1974. Her thesis was titled Israeli medical graduates, a subgroup of the FMG population. Ron earned a Ph.D. from Sackler Faculty of Medicine at Tel Aviv University. She was a postdoctoral researcher and visiting associate in the National Cancer Institute (NCI) environmental epidemiology branch from 1980 to 1981.

== Career and research ==
From 1981 to 1986, Ron was chief of the cancer unit in the department of clinical epidemiology at the Sheba Medical Center. While there, she investigated cancer in infertile women. She joined the NCI in 1986 and served as chief of the radiation epidemiology branch from 1997 to 2002. Ron was an advocate of equity for women scientists at work, preventing cruelty to animals, and advancing human rights. She was the first woman scientist advisor in the division of cancer epidemiology and genetics at the NCI. Her advocacy for women led to regular salary comparisons by gender, expanded NIH daycare facilities, workplace flexibility for tenure-track investigators to work part time, and named lectureships honoring women scientists.

Ron specialized in radiation epidemiology and in the causes of thyroid cancer. In her earliest work in Israel, she identified the long-term cancer effects of radiation treatment for tinea capitis. She conducted studies of the atomic bomb survivors in Japan, residents of the former Soviet Union exposed to the radioactive compounds from the Chernobyl accident and patients exposed to diagnostic and therapeutic radiation. Ron led the largest study of cancer risks among patients treated with radioactive iodine for hyperthyroidism and the first international effort to pool epidemiologic data on thyroid cancer. She launched a major investigation into the potential adverse effects of clinical trial screening among children and young adults.

On March 9, 2011, the NCI hosted a memorial symposium on research strategies in radiation and cancer in Ron's honor.

== Personal life ==
Ron died of cancer on November 20, 2010, at her home in Bethesda, Maryland. She was survived by her son, Ariel.
