= Elaine Arnold =

American opera singer

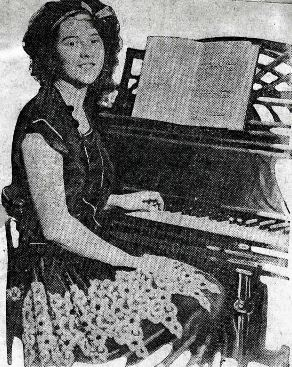
Elaine Arnold

Elaine Arnold, married name Gloria Elaine Scorza, (April 1, 1911, Houston, Texas, USA – December 1, 2006) was the stage name of the American soprano opera singer Gloria E. Arnold. She was the youngest person in history to receive a scholarship to the Juilliard School and was a protege of Marcella Sembrich.

== Biography ==
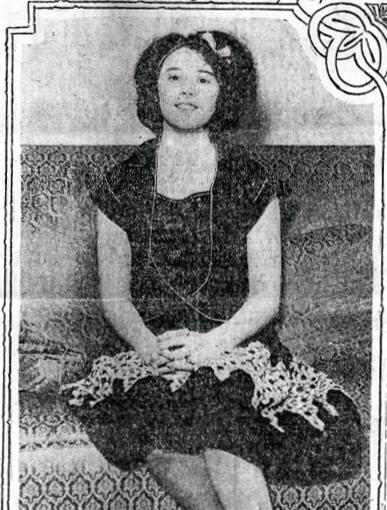
Elaine Arnold 1927

Arnold was a soprano from Houston, Texas, who sang in 1924 at the age of 13 for the British aristocracy at a convention in London, England, and later at a reception held by the President of France in Paris. She is remembered for her ability to hold the high F, a feat frequently needed for operatic arias.

When only 13 years of age, she gained popularity in Texas, where she became known as "the Texas Nightingale". In London, performing at the American Convention, she impressed the British audience with Félicien David's "Thou Lovely Bird" from his operetta La perle du Brésil, followed by "Comin' Thro' the Rye".

In 1927, thanks to a Juilliard School of Music scholarship, she studied in New York under the Polish opera singer Marcella Sembrich, becoming her protégé. She continued her studies in Milan, Italy, receiving training in operas including La traviata, La bohème and Donizeti's La fille du régiment.

In 1931, at her Milan début as Amina in Bellini's La Sonnambula, she met her husband to be, Mario Scorza, a stained-glass artist. Two years later, as Mussolini gained power, they left Italy for the United States. While Elaine Scorza, partly as a result of the Great Depression, did not continue to perform, she helped to train those interested in Italian opera and, as an accomplished concert pianist, played Beethoven and Chopin. She was also an enthusiastic member of San Antonio's opera circle.
