= Elaine Cohen =

American mathematician

Elaine Cohen (July 17, 1946 – October 19, 2025) was an American researcher in geometric modeling and computer graphics, known for her pioneering research on B-splines. She was a professor in the school of computing at the University of Utah.

== Education and career ==
Cohen graduated from Vassar College in 1968, with a bachelor's degree in mathematics. She went to Syracuse University for graduate study in mathematics, earning a master's degree in 1970 and completing her doctorate in 1974. Her dissertation, On the Degree of Approximation of a Function by Partial Sums of its Fourier Series, concerned approximation theory, and was supervised by Daniel Waterman.

At the University of Utah, Cohen became the first woman to gain tenure at the School of Engineering.

== Contributions ==
With Richard F. Riesenfeld and Gershon Elber, Cohen is the author of the book Geometric Modeling with Splines: An Introduction (AK Peters, 2001).

She has also contributed to the development of the Utah teapot, improving it from a two-dimensional surface with no thickness to a bona-fide three-dimensional object.

== Recognition ==
In 2005, the YWCA of Salt Lake City gave Cohen their Outstanding Achievement Award. In 2009, Cohen and Riesenfeld were awarded the Pierre Bézier Award of the Solid Modeling Association for their work on B-splines in computer aided geometric design.

== Memory ==
To honor her scientific and professional legacy, the Dr. Elaine Cohen Memorial Scholarship Fund was established through AnitaB.org to support women in technology.
