= Elaine Stewart =

Elaine Stewart may refer to:

- Elaine Stewart (actress), American actress
- Elaine Stewart (politician), British politician
