= Elaine Abrams =

American physician and epidemiologist

- Born: Brooklyn, New York
- Education: Princeton University; Columbia University
- Scientific career
- Fields: Epidemiology
- Institutions: Columbia University; Harlem Hospital Center

Elaine Abrams is an American physician and epidemiologist who is a professor of epidemiology at Columbia University Mailman School of Public Health. She looks to optimize the treatment of people living with HIV and prevent illness amongst children. She is a founding member of the International Center for AIDS Care and Treatment Program (ICAP) at Columbia.

== Early life and education ==
Abrams grew up in Brooklyn. Her mother was a Holocaust survivor. She was an undergraduate student at Princeton University and a medical student at Columbia University College of Physicians and Surgeons. She completed her specialty training at the Harlem Hospital Center. She was working in New York during the outbreak of the AIDS epidemic, and established the Harlem Hospital Center Family Care Center in 1989. The center was founded to respond to the epidemic of HIV infection in young people in New York City. During this time she became a fierce advocate for women's health.

== Research and career ==
Abrams works on the prevention and treatment of HIV infection in perinatal and pediatric populations. She serves as a professor of epidemiology at Columbia University. She has designed and studied antiretroviral treatment (ART) campaigns for women pre- and post-partum, and studied the risks of vertical transmission. Her research identified environmental and biomedical factors that influence ART efficacy.

Abrmas chaired the World Health Organization consolidation guidelines for the use of ART, including guidelines for dolutegravir/lamivudine/tenofovir. In this capacity she was responsible for transforming access to HIV treatment.

Abrams is a founding member of the Columbia University International Center for AIDS Care and Treatment Program (ICAP). With ICAP, Abrams has looked to scale-up HIV services across developing countries, including improving the lives of children. She created various programs that look to prevent HIV infections amongst children, including Positive Voices, EID Manual and PMTCT toolkit. Her work at ICAP was supported by the President's Emergency Plan for AIDS Relief (PEPfAR), which supported her efforts to provide technical assistance to the global south.

== Selected publications ==
- John P. A. Ioannidis; Elaine J. Abrams; Arthur Ammann; et al. (12 January 2001). "Perinatal transmission of human immunodeficiency virus type 1 by pregnant women with RNA virus loads <1000 copies/ml". The Journal of Infectious Diseases. 183 (4): 539–545. doi:10.1086/318530. ISSN 0022-1899. PMID 11170978. Wikidata Q45122582.
- Carolyn Bolton-Moore; Mwangelwa Mubiana-Mbewe; Ronald A Cantrell; et al. (1 October 2007). "Clinical outcomes and CD4 cell response in children receiving antiretroviral therapy at primary health care facilities in Zambia". JAMA. 298 (16): 1888–1899. doi:10.1001/JAMA.298.16.1888. ISSN 0098-7484. PMID 17954540. Wikidata Q42635298.
- Claude Ann Mellins; Elizabeth Brackis-Cott; Curtis Dolezal; Elaine J Abrams (1 November 2004). "The role of psychosocial and family factors in adherence to antiretroviral treatment in human immunodeficiency virus-infected children". The Pediatric Infectious Disease Journal. 23 (11): 1035–1041. doi:10.1097/01.INF.0000143646.15240.AC. ISSN 0891-3668. PMID 15545859. Wikidata Q39700582.
