= Elaine Kahn =

American poet

- Born: Evanston, Illinois, United States
- Education: MFA from the Iowa Writer's Workshop
- Website: http://www.elainekahn.org

Elaine Kahn is an American poet, artist, and musician based in Los Angeles, California.

== Biography ==
Elaine Kahn (born in Evanston, Illinois) is a writer, artist, and musician currently living in Los Angeles, CA. She has a Bachelor of Arts degree from the California College of the Arts and an MFA from the Iowa Writers' Workshop. Kahn has authored four short poetry books, as well as the full-length collection Women In Public (City Lights, 2015). She has also toured with her music project, Horsebladder. Additionally, Kahn is a founding member of the feminist puppet troop P.Splash Collective

== Writing ==
Kahn's writing has been described as "strategic attacks against mythic fictions like selfhood, gender, even the universal acceptance of scientific knowledge. Publishers Weekly described Women In Public as, "a precise and attentive debut full-length collection [that] probes at notions of femininity with a sharp dagger, her terse but assertive stanzas carrying an understated conviction." Her writing has been featured in Frieze Magazine, Brooklyn Rail, The Poetry Foundation, NADA Contemporary Poetry Zine, Art Papers, Coldfront, Octopus Magazine, SFMOMA's Open Space, Jubilat, Boog City, and other outlets. Kim Gordon listed Kahn as one of the best contemporary writers in a "By The Book" feature in The New York Times. Kahn is the managing editor of the small press Flowers & Cream

== Publications ==
- Romance or The End (Soft Skull Press, 2020)
- I Told You I Was Sick: A Romance (After Hours Ltd., 2017)
- Women in Public (City Lights Books, 2015)
- A Voluptuous Dream During an Eclipse (Poor Claudia/Octopus Books, 2012)
- Customer (Ecstatic Peace Library, 2010)
- Radiant Bottle Caps (Glasseye, 2008)

== Music ==
Kahn's music project, Horsebladder, consists of minimalist loops and incantations, creating primitive pop songs. Horsebladder has toured throughout the US and Canada with acts such as Body/Head and Weyes Blood. Horsebladder's most recent LP, a split with Farewell My Concubine called After You, came out on Hot Releases in 2014. Previous releases include the LP Not I'll Not (Ecstatic Peace, 2011) and the cassettes Summer (PSA Tapes, 2013) and Nicole (Night People, 2010).
