= Elaine Crowley =

Elaine Crowley may refer to:

- Elaine Crowley (author) (1927–2011), Irish author
- Elaine Crowley (presenter) (born 1977), Irish journalist, presenter and newsreader
