= Elaine Avila =

American dramatist

Elaine Avila is a Canadian-American playwright, screenwriter, educator, and dramaturge. As a playwright, her works have been produced all over the world, in places like Panama, New York City, Lisbon, the Azores, Los Angeles, Santa Cruz, London, Toronto, Seattle, Vancouver and Victoria. Her works have been noted for "frequently incorporating music, politics, and humor." Pulitzer Prize winning playwright Suzan-Lori Parks has described Avila as a "wonderful writer, tremendously gifted, reliable and innovative".

== Early life and education ==
=== Early life ===
Born in Maryland, Avila spent the majority of her childhood in San Jose, California. On her father's side, she has a distinct Azorean-Portuguese heritage. Her grandfather, before he immigrated to America to get an education, was a photographer in his home village of Ribeiras, Pico. The specifics of her mother's history are less obvious. In an interview with arts advocate Chris Casquilho on the website HowlRound, Avila has mentioned that her mother was "a part of a state bureaucratic experiment in social engineering... [she was] given up for adoption at birth .. [and] placed with a family that was a “close genetic match” to her biological parents; then all information leading back to [her] birth parents was wiped out."

Avila was first introduced to theater when a childhood friend of hers asked her to come watch a play she was in. From that moment, Avila has said, that theater quickly became "all she ever wanted to do". She first showed interest in becoming either an actor or director. He first paid acting was as a reader at San Jose Rep. An early mentor of hers – the executive director of the repertory Jim Reber – taught her about management and producing. It was not until college, though, the she began to consider becoming a playwright.

=== Education ===
Avila was in the class of 1987 at Sara Clara University; she studied theater, acting, and art history. She wrote her first play inspired by a historical event she studied in a theater history course. It was about "a [commedia de'll arte] troupe in the sixteenth-century run by a woman that was captured by terrorists, which led to the overthrow of the French government". Often feeling like women were underrepresented on the stage, Avila was determined to tell the story of that artist.

After graduating from Sara Clara, Avila received a full scholarship to attend California Institute of the Arts. There she was mentored by, now, Pulitzer Prize winning playwright Suzan-Lori Parks. Parks' work, specifically American Play, had a profound impact on Avila. It inspired to seek out stories that are often not seen on the American stage.

== Works ==
=== Plays ===
- Burn Gloom
- At Water's Edge
- Good Fooling
- Quality
- Lieutenant Nun
- Strike!
- E-mail from Howard Dean
- Flies of Summer
- Jane Austen, Action Figure... and Other Short Plays
- Kitimat

=== Screenplays ===
- Fortune
- Kai takes a Solo
- Outskirts
- Alvarado
- Lead Dress

== LEAP Playwriting Intensive ==
In 2006, Avila founded and served as the director of a multicultural playwriting initiative in Vancouver called LEAP. Through the program, around 150 young writers, 16 to 18 years old, are "mentored through the creation of original dramatic works". LEAP strives to cultivate in their students "positive relationships" with their creativity; it has been credited as a fundamental component in many of it artists' lives. Avila served as the director for one year before handing over the position to the current director Shawn Macdonald.

=== Program ===
All applicants are asked to submit multiple pieces of writing. Once accepted, students gain access to classes taught by the program leader, are given opportunities to network with theater professionals working on new plays, take trips to see select productions, and, lastly, get the chance to have their work workshopped and read by professional actors at their annual festival. By the end of the program, many of the artists will leave with a full length dramatic script.

The program is broken up into three levels:

"Level 1 students are mentored through the creation of a short play (10 minutes), Level 2 students write one-act plays, and the Level 3 student is supported through the creation of a full-length play."[5]

== Awards and nominations ==
- The Victoria Critic's Circle for Best New Play, a Canada Council Millennium Grant
- “New Works for Young Women” Award/Residency from Tulsa University
- Canada Council (the Canadian NEA)/Playwright's Guild of Canada Awards
- The A.S.K. Theatre Projects Scholarship
- Research Fellowship from the Office of the New Mexico State Historian
- The Alden B. Dow Fellowship
- Career Development and Creative Work Grants

== Personal life ==
Avila lives with her husband - a professional jazz musician - and her child in Vancouver, BC. She is fluent in both Portuguese and Spanish.
