= Elaine Smith =

Elaine Smith may refer to:

- Elaine Smith (Scottish politician) (born 1963), Scottish Labour politician
- Elaine Smith (Idaho politician) (died 2024), Democratic Idaho State Representative
- Elaine Smith (actress) (born 1962), Scottish-born Australian actress
- Elaine C. Smith (born 1958), Scottish actress and comedian
- Elaine Smith, mother of Paula Yates and a showgirl, actress and writer of erotic novels, who used the stage names Helene Thornton and Heller Torren
