= Elaine D. Harmon =

American aviator

Elaine Danforth Harmon
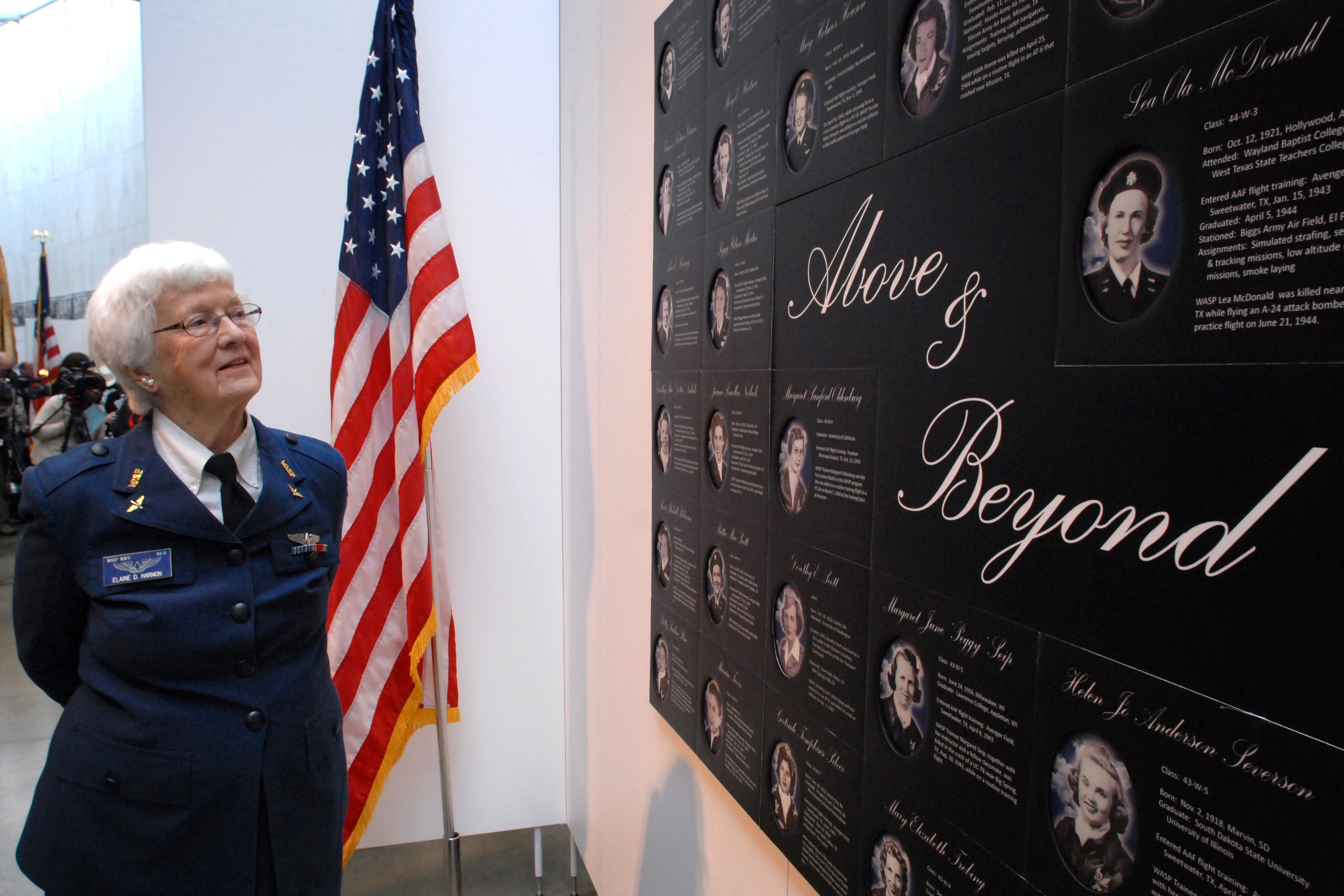
- Elaine D. Harmon walks through the "Fly Girls of World War II" exhibit in Arlington, Virginia
- Born: Elaine Danforth; December 26, 1919; Baltimore, Maryland
- Died: April 21, 2015 (aged 95); Casey House hospice center, Rockville, Maryland
- Spouse: Robert Harmon
- Children: 2 sons, 2 daughters

Elaine D. Harmon (December 26, 1919 – April 21, 2015) was an American from Maryland who served in the U.S. Women Airforce Service Pilots (WASP) during World War II. In 2009 she received a Congressional Gold Medal for her service as a pilot during World War II. As a WASP pilot, she has been accorded full military honors at Arlington National Cemetery. In 2016, Ms. Harmon was posthumously inducted into the Maryland Women's Hall of Fame.

== Early life and education ==
Elaine Danforth Harmon, daughter of Dr. Dave Danforth and Margaret Oliphant Danforth, was born December 26, 1919, in Baltimore, Maryland. A 1936 graduate of Eastern High School, in 1940 she earned a bachelor of science degree in bacteriology at the University of Maryland, College Park. From 1940 to 1944 she worked as a hospital lab technician. In 1941 she married patent attorney Robert Harmon and they lived in Silver Spring, Maryland. They had two sons and two daughters. Her husband died in 1965.

== Careers ==
While at the university she became a private pilot through the Civilian Pilot Training Program. Harmon learned to fly Piper Cubs at College Park Airport as part of the Civil Aeronautics Authority program. She joined the Women Airforce Service Pilots against her mother's wishes, who thought WASPs "were all just awful, just probably loose women".

Over 25,000 women had applied to the program; Harmon was one of 1,830 accepted, and one of 1,074 who earned their wings. She completed six months of flight training and ground school, as well as at least 500 flight hours. After training at Avenger Field in 1944, she served at Nellis Air Force Base, flying trainers PT-17 and BT-13, the AT-6 Texan, and the B-17 Flying Fortress. Harmon's job was to fly with men who needed retraining in instrument flying — she said she served as a lookout, "to make sure that we didn’t run into any other airplanes".

Following the war, Harmon had a 25-year career as an independent real estate appraiser, working for Associated Appraisers in Beltsville, Maryland, until retiring in the early 1990s.

== Legacy ==
=== Maryland Women's Hall of Fame ===
A lifelong resident of Maryland, and in recognition of her role model status, having been a trailblazing female pilot during WWII, in 2016 Ms. Harmon was posthumously inducted into the Maryland Women's Hall of Fame. The following is the inscription on the plaque placed in her honor at the Maryland Women's Heritage Museum:

"It was a man's world, but we (WASP) did something really great that was needed for the war effort ... There is never a day that I don't think how lucky I am to be a U.S. citizen and a Maryland resident ... Carpé Diem!"

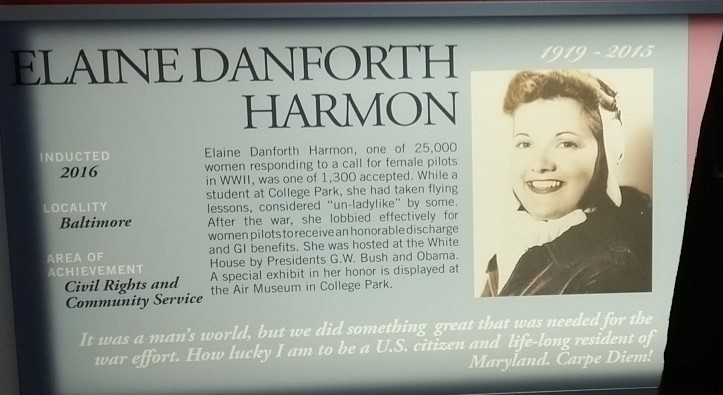

=== College Park Aviation Museum - University of Maryland ===
Ms. Harmon learned to fly at the College Park Airport on the campus of the University of Maryland, from which she graduated in 1941. Her WASP artifacts (Flight Log, uniform, Congressional Gold Medal) are on permanent display at the College Park Aviation Museum.

== Controversy over WASP benefits ==
WASPs had been assigned to non-combat operational duties, such as ferrying cargo, delivering new planes, training male pilots, and dragging targets for other pilots. Because they flew domestic missions, the Army had classified WASPs as civilians rather than veterans, and they were not eligible for veterans' benefits, including burial at Arlington National Cemetery. Army Air Forces Commanding General Henry Arnold had championed WASP benefits to Congress, but male pilots objected that the women were taking their jobs, and Congress denied the women veterans' status.

President Jimmy Carter signed legislation in 1977 granting WASPs veteran status, and in 2002 the Army granted military funeral honors to WASPs, including eligibility for inurnment at Arlington National Cemetery. Harmon was honored with a Congressional Gold Medal in 2009. However, in March 2015, secretary of the Army John McHugh ruled that due to a technicality in the 1977 legislation, WASPs did not have status in the Army, and were only eligible for burial in cemeteries administered by the Veterans Administration. Representative Martha McSally (R-Arizona) and Senators Barbara Mikulski (D-Maryland) and Joni Ernst (R-Iowa) introduced legislation in 2016 to reinstate inurnment rights for WASPs at Arlington. The legislation was passed unanimously by both houses of Congress, and President Obama signed it into law in May 2016.

Elaine Harmon was buried at Arlington as she had wished on September 7, 2016.
