= Elaine Stratford =

Geographer in Australia

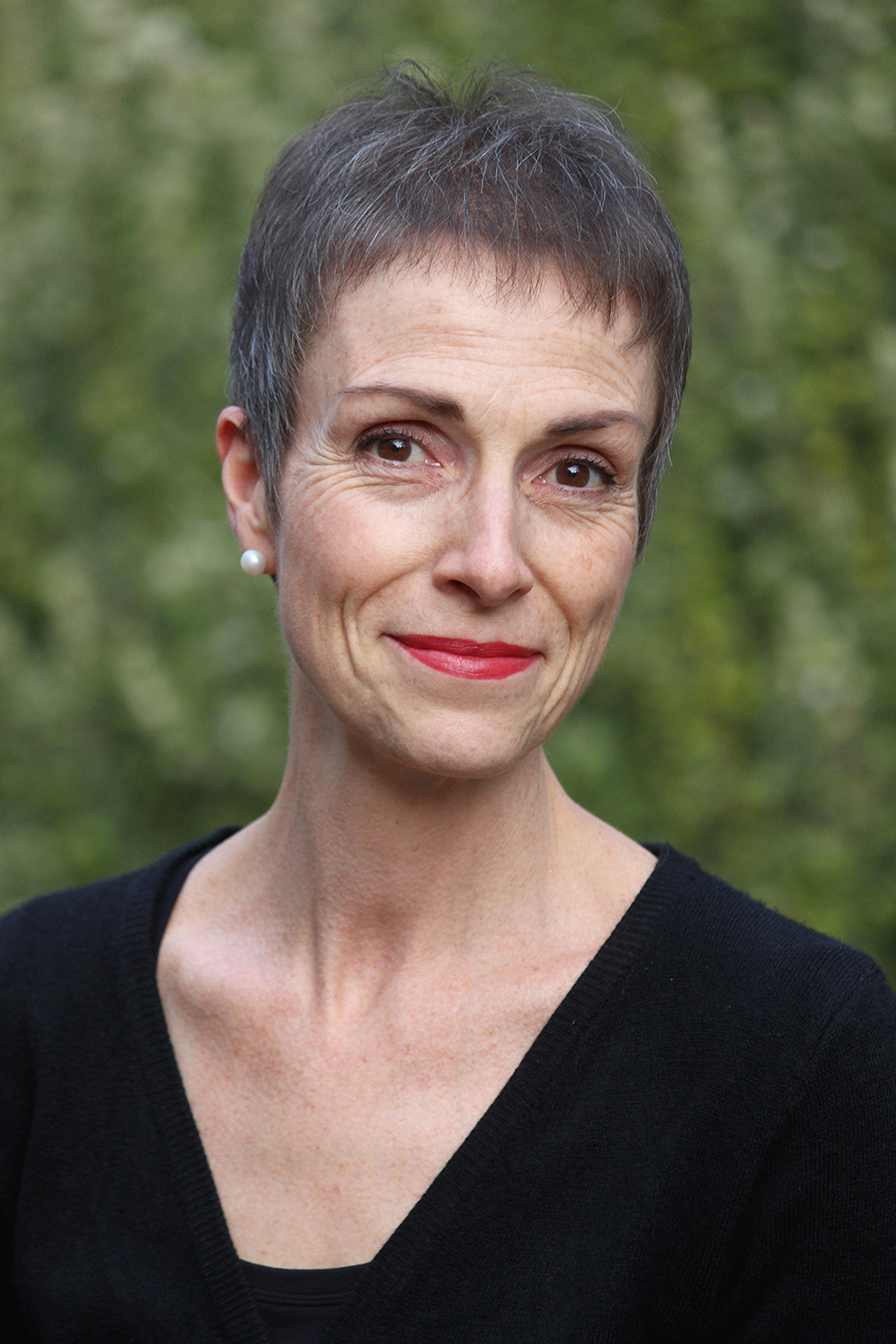
- Born: Saskatoon, Saskatchewan, Canada
- Citizenship: Australian
- Occupations: Cultural and political geographer, academic and author
- Awards: Griffith Taylor Medal, Institute of Australian Geographers (2021)

Academic background
- Education: Flinders University, BA in Geography and Visual Arts (1984); The University of Adelaide, PhD in Environmental Studies(1996); The University of Melbourne, Masters of Tertiary Education Management (2010)

Elaine Stratford is an Australian cultural and political geographer, academic, and author. She is a professor of geography in the School of Geography, Planning, and Spatial Sciences in the College of Sciences and Engineering at the University of Tasmania.

Stratford's work has focused on how people think about flourishing and languishing in place and on the move over the life-course in both historical and contemporary settings.

Stratford is a Fellow of the Institute of Australian Geographers from whom, in 2021, she received the highest award, the Griffith Taylor Medal, for her contributions to geography in Australia. She is also a Fellow of both the Royal Society of Arts and the Royal Geographical Society/Institute of British Geographers.

== Early life and education ==
Stratford was born in Saskatoon, Saskatchewan and then lived in Christchurch, New Zealand, and Adelaide, Canberra, and Hobart in Australia. She completed her undergraduate education at Flinders University, earning a Bachelor of Arts in Geography and Visual Arts in 1984, followed by a Degree in Geography in 1986. She pursued her doctoral research in Environmental Studies at the Mawson Graduate Centre for Environmental Studies at The University of Adelaide from 1992 to 1995. In 2010, she also completed a Master of Tertiary Education Management at the LH Martin Institute at The University of Melbourne, and her minor dissertation was on the role of university heads of departments.

== Career ==
Stratford began her academic career in 1987 as a tutor in geography at Flinders University. From 1992 to 1995, while working on her PhD she worked as a tutor in the Mawson Centre and as a Research Assistant to the Professor of Linguistics. In December 1995, she joined the University of Tasmania as a lecturer. She was promoted to senior lecturer in 2003, to associate professor in 2008, and to professor in 2016.

Stratford was the Head of the School of Geography and Environmental Studies at the University of Tasmania from mid-2005 to the end 2013. She was appointed the founding Director of the Peter Underwood Centre for Educational Attainment within the same institution in 2015, and continued to do research with the Underwood Centre from 2017 to 2019 while working on special projects in the Institute for the Study of Social Change.

In 2020, Stratford was seconded to be Acting Head of the School of Technology, Environments and Design. In 2021, she was seconded again to a limited term position as Associate Executive Dean at the College of Sciences and Engineering. Since 2022, she has resumed her role as professor in the School of Geography, Planning, and Spatial Sciences at the University of Tasmania. Throughout her time at the University of Tasmania, she held several appointed and elected leadership roles.

Stratford also engaged in leadership in Tasmania, nationally, and internationally. From 2011 to 2014, Stratford held a ministerial appointment as the Chair of the Tasmanian Southern Regional Reference Group for Economic Development. She had also served as the Chair of the Tasmanian Settlements Committee for the State of the Environment Report from 1999 to 2003. She was also an inaugural member of Australian Council of Environmental Deans and Directors, a Founding Member of the International Geographical Union Commission on Small Islands, and an Executive Member of the International Small Island Studies Association.

== Research ==
Stratford's research in human geography explores factors that contribute to human flourishing in different contexts, encompassing place, movements, daily life, and the life-course in both historical and contemporary settings. Part of that focus has meant understanding why (and where) people languish. Given concerns about climate change and rising sea levels, studies with children and young people in island locations have been one focus of her work. That focus has led to other studies on elemental geographies, including the cultural and political geographies of drowning.

Stratford has written or co-authored over 300 outputs— books, edited collections, chapters, journal articles, editorials, research reports, and opinion pieces. These outputs have been used to create knowledge about settlements, communities, and mobilities over the life-course; island studies; and sustainability studies; those foci have been underpinned by other work on geographical thought and professional life in higher education.

=== Works ===
Among Stratford's authored books are Geographies, Mobilities, and Rhythms Over the Life- Course; Home, Nature, and the Feminine Ideal; Rethinking Island Methodologies (with Godfrey Baldacchino and Elizabeth McMahon); and Landscape, Association, Empire: Imagining Van Diemen’s Land (with Philip Hutch). Her edited works include Australian Cultural Geographies, commissioned when she was still a doctoral candidate; Island Geographies: Essays and Conversations, and Territory Beyond Terra (with Kimberley Peters and Philip Steinberg).

In Stratford's edited book, Island Geographies: Essays and Conversations, several academics presented perspectives that offered empirical evidence of the contributions human geographers could make to understanding islands. Keith Jackson commended her book, noting that one of its outstanding features is the way in which she has linked structure to the coherence of analysis and added that "Readers who are aspiring researchers in these overlapping fields of geographical enquiry can take inspiration from this conversation." Richard Howitt in his review for Geographical Research remarked, "In Island Geographies, an impressive and diverse collection of essays, and a terrific, but singular conversation, considers the contemporary implications and challenges the dominance of continental discourse," and it "calls into question the very processes by which we imagine things to bound into an impermeable category when they are entangled in mobile, changeable, and relational settings."

Co-edited with Kimberley Peters and Philip Steinberg, Stratford's book Territory Beyond Terra, explored the politics of dynamic and contentious spaces, such as oceans, air, and watercourses, extending the understanding of territory beyond the simplistic characterization of land as fixed points with stable features. António Ferraz de Oliveira praised Territory beyond Terra for contributing to the new literature that explores the "interconnections between geopolitics, environmental governance, and the Anthropocene... with a collection of thoughtful essays on how indeterminate elements, environments, and bodies can flow against expectations of an abstract and fixed political spatiality." Alistair Sisson, in a review for Australian Geographer, stated that the book "undoubtedly succeeds in destabilising inherited ontologies of territory and provides myriad alternative or extended theorisations and practices... in decoupling territory from terrain." Dibyesh Anand, an academic at the University of Westminster, commented that "Territory will never feel the same after reading this book." In addition, Sasha Engelmann characterized this volume as "essential reading for scholars working at the intersection of political philosophy, geography and anthropology and is, at the same time, a generous invitation for further investments in thinking about elemental and fluid territories."

In 2019, Stratford authored the book, Home, Nature, and the Feminine Ideal: Geographies of the Interior and of Empire, which explored the interconnectedness of home, nature, and the feminine ideal, tracing their roles in shaping anatomo-politics, biopolitics, and diverse geographies across the nineteenth century Anglophone world. Jean Hillier called this book a "major work on the biopolitical shaping of femininity in the Anglophone world in the 19th Century – and indeed into the 21st Century." Ruth Fincher also reviewed this work and commented that "Stratford's lively, wide-ranging and yet penetrating analysis of nineteenth century texts shows how women's bodies were governed in the interests of improvement." Francesca Moore found it, "a superb book that is avowedly geographical in its Foucauldian exploration of gendered social norms and the relationship between bodies and territories," and Carla Pascoe Leahy noted that "Engaging with an impressively interdisciplinary body of knowledge, Stratford... displays her scholarly dexterity and sophistication in managing to create a compelling narrative and "manages to genuinely straddle and bridge multiple disciplines."

Over the course of her career, Stratford has been involved in journal editing and review processes. She was the editor-in-chief of Geographical Research between December 2015 and the end of November 2024, and is now Senior Associate Editor for the journal. Stratford was also lead editor for Rowman and Littlefield's ten-year book series Rethinking the Island (2014–2023).

=== Settlements, communities, and mobilities over the life-course ===
Stratford's work has provided insights into the interplay between settlements, communities, and mobilities. She has examined the impact of climate change mobility on identity, specifically focusing on the effects of climate change migration on island identity and geography. Additionally, her research has addressed the research gap on race and alterity in climate change and migration debates, connecting them with critical race theory and postcolonial theory. She has also collaborated on work about the challenges and opportunities faced by Tuvaluans in relation to climate change and about alternative perspectives on sovereignty and mobility.

In her book Geographies, Mobilities and Rhythms over the Life-Course: Adventures in the Intervals, Stratford has explored the significance of movements, rhythms, and changing locations throughout one's life. The work started with an examination of the geographies of conception and birth and ended with another about the geographies of dying and death, and included chapters on children and climate change; adolescents, street skating, and rights to the city; workers, commuting, and terrorism on the Underground; and older adults and the geographies of working out to stay fit. Throughout, the focus was on the search for individual and collective ways to flourish in the face of significant challenges. Susannah Clement pointed out the book's "incredible richness," attributing it to the "multidisciplinary nature of the empirical examples." She also said that “This striking, remarkable book has a great deal to offer diverse readers across mobility studies, emotional geography and life-course geographies, as well as, more broadly, a wide range of social policy and planning areas." Hector Agredano, in a review featured in the Journal of Cultural Geography, remarked that Stratford's book is “An ambitious work that is theoretically expansive and intellectually generative. Ample in scope – covering the life-course from conception to death” and “can serve as a basis for generating ideas."

Stratford's research has also looked into how age is constructed and experienced in mobile urban spaces, with a particular emphasis on intergenerational mobilities. In related research with Gordon Waitt and Teresa Harada, she has emphasized the potential of philosophical pragmatism to offer fresh insights into walkability and its role in promoting spatial qualities, spatial justice, and civic participation in small city centers. She has investigated the relationship between skating, urban governance, and public space, uncovering implications for citizenship and safety, and producing a rare comparative analysis of skater mortality in the United States and Australia. Her work on parklets in Australia with Nicholas Jarman has revealed a desire for people-oriented street design and highlighted the uncertain outcomes of T/T urbanism initiatives led by large organizations.

=== Island studies ===
Stratford has made contributions on small island sustainability as well. Her research has focused on unique island characteristics, the impact of globalization, and strategies to effectively manage social, economic, and environmental challenges while promoting human and social capital. In one of her early collaborative works, she put forth a research agenda to inquire into the neglected nexus between land and sea, as well as the connection between islands and the continent/mainland. That work led to multi-year collaborations for Tasmania's international arts festival, 10 Days on the Island when it was led by Robyn Archer and then Elizabeth Walsh. Several other projects, installations, and events emerged from that work including an arts and education project, Webbing the Islands, with Sarah Howell. Another collaboration, Map of a Dream of the Future, was with Nicholas Low, Heidi Douglas, Anna Pafitis, and Joc May, and presented at the Junction Arts Festival.

Stratford has also analyzed islandness as a set of emotional geographies and considered its relevance for governing islands, particularly regarding the divisive impacts of economic development. In addition, she has studied how involving young people in interpretive trails can promote a sense of responsibility and empower them to tackle local climate change and sustainability challenges. In artist Colin Langridge's Dis-covery exhibition she investigated how artists have engaged with the geopolitical spaces of islands, challenging romanticized representations and addressing issues such as resource mining and marginalization. Some of her work has also addressed the complexities of the Anthropocene and colonial legacies, documenting an attempt to decolonize the methodology of their island research. This approach emphasized respect for islands and their islanders.

=== Sustainability studies ===
Stratford's research has contributed to sustainability studies, including in environmental management and planning and natural resource management (NRM). In collaborative work, she has addressed the challenges associated with multi-level environmental governance in Australian NRM and emphasized the significance of establishing effective communication and coordination mechanisms between various levels of governance. That group of researchers proposed a set of governance principles applicable to NRM at local, subnational, and national scales that has become a by-word in the sector and among scholars. In 2006, her joint research examined the UNESCO Biosphere Reserve Program in Australia, exploring factors that influenced renewed interest and highlighting limited success in the country. In one of many collaborations with Julie Davidson, she applied the capital assets model to research social and institutional aspects of NRM, prioritizing collaboration, flexibility, and sustainability. Moreover, integrating the capital assets model with intercultural borderlands, she addressed Australia's unique land management tensions. Her work also investigated the relationship between gender and water in South Australia, revealing the impact of gender on individuals' connections to environmental resources. In mapping the gendered dimensions of modern water management, she advocated for the integration of the feminine principle in resource management.

=== Geographical thought and professional life in higher education ===
Stratford has focused on enhancing academic writing and facilitating engagement and influence within the discipline of geographical thought. In the early stages of her academic career, she conducted "The Millennium Project," an oral history project on Australian Geography and Geographers. This project focused on preserving the narratives of foundational figures within the discipline and examining the amalgamation of geography and environmental studies within Australian universities, shedding light on the associated concerns and debates. Centered on qualitative research methods in human geography, her joint research with Karen George elucidated the utilization of oral history in geographical research. This covered aspects such as rapport building, addressing sensitivities, ethics, effective questioning, and sound quality. One of her highly cited works, in collaboration with Bradshaw, contributed to establishing the significance of careful design and rigorous methodology in ensuring the dependability of qualitative research. This encompassed tasks such as crafting research questions, selecting cases and participants, and ensuring comprehensive research rigor. She has also published numerous editorials at the journal Geographical Research, In 2022, she initiated a Festschrift offering in the journal, starting with a celebration of the contributions of emeritus Professor Ruth Fincher, highlighting colleagues' influences on the discipline.

At the age of 19, with Dianne Joy, Stratford led a campaign against Flinders University's decision to cancel women's studies, advocating for increased investment in the field. Additionally, her research has explored the role of the head of school/department, analyzing tensions faced by university heads, underlining the need for management and leadership skills beyond academia, and investigating the potential transformation of the headship role. This work focused on the context of the University of Tasmania, Australia, and extended to broader implications within the sector.

== Awards and honors ==
- 2009 – Fellow, Institute of Australian Geographers
- 2016 – Fellow, Royal Society of Art
- 2021 – Griffith Taylor Medal, Institute of Australian Geographers
- 2025 – Rockefeller Foundation Bellagio Center Writer's Residency Fellowship

== Bibliography ==
=== Books ===
- Geographies, Mobilities, and Rhythms Over the Life-Course (2015) ISBN 978-1-135-11742-9
- Home, Nature, and the Feminine Ideal (2019) ISBN 978-1-78348-510-9
- Rethinking Island Methodologies with Godfrey Baldacchino and Elizabeth McMahon (2023) ISBN 978-1-5381-6519-5
- Landscape, Association, Empire with Philip Hutch (2024) ISBN 978-981-99-5418-6

=== Edited books ===
- Australian Cultural Geographies (1999) ISBN 978-0-19-550608-2
- Island Geographies: Essays and Conversations (2017) ISBN 978-1-138-33935-4
- Territory Beyond Terra (2018) ISBN 978-1-78660-013-4

=== Selected articles ===
- Stratford, E. (2008). Islandness and struggles over development: A Tasmanian case study. Political Geography, 27(2), 160–175.
- Lockwood, M., Davidson, J., Curtis, A., Stratford, E., & Griffith, R. (2009). Multi-level environmental governance: lessons from Australian natural resource management. Australian Geographer, 40(2), 169–186. *Lockwood, M., Davidson, J., Curtis, A., Stratford, E., & Griffith, R. (2010). Governance principles for natural resource management. Society and Natural Resources, 23(10), 986–1001.
- Stratford, E., Baldacchino, G., McMahon, E., Farbotko, C., & Harwood, A. (2011). Envisioning the archipelago. Island Studies Journal, 6(2), 113–130.
- Farbotko, C., Stratford, E. and Lazrus, H. (2016) Climate migrants and new identities? The geopolitics of embracing or rejecting mobility, Social and Cultural Geography 17(4), 533–52.
- Stratford, E. (2016) Mobilizing a spatial politics of street skating: thinking about the geographies of generosity, Annals of the Association of American Geographers 106(2), 350–357.
- Stratford, E., Waitt, G. and Harada, T. (2019) Walking city streets: spatial qualities, spatial justice, and democratizing impulses, Transactions of the Institute of British Geographers 45(1), 123–138.
- Stratford, E., & Bradshaw, M. B. (2021). Rigorous and trustworthy: Qualitative research design. In I. Hay & M. Cope (Eds.), Qualitative Research Methods in Human Geography (5th ed.). Oxford University Press.
- Stratford, E., Farbotko, C., Watson, P., Kitara, T., Berthelsen, J., Hnaraki, M. C., Ginoza, A., Cozier, C., & Hardenberg, J. E. (2023) Islands, the Anthropocene, and Decolonisation. Antipode, 55(4), 1255–1274.
- Morgan, M., Stratford, E., Harpur, S., and Rowbotham, S. (2023) A systems thinking approach for community health and wellbeing. Systemic Action and Research 37(May), 161–183,
