= Elaine Diacumakos =

Cell biologist

- Born: 11 August 1930
- Died: 11 June 1984 (aged 53)
- Education: University of Maryland, College Park; New York University
- Known for: Cell biology
- Scientific career
- Workplaces: Rockefeller University

Elaine Diacumakos (August 11, 1930 – June 11, 1984) was an American cell biologist and head of the cytobiology laboratory at Rockefeller University. She developed the first techniques for removing and inserting material into and from cells.

== Early life and education ==
Diacumakos was born in Chester, Pennsylvania on August 11, 1930. She studied zoology at the University of Maryland, College Park, graduating in 1951. She completed a master's degree in embryology in 1955 and her doctorate at New York University in 1958. She remained there as a research associate until 1964.

== Research ==
Diacumakos completed her postdoctoral training at Rockefeller University between 1958 and 1960. She worked at the Memorial Sloan Kettering Cancer Center and Cornell University Medical Center from 1965 to 1971. In 1961 she joined Edward Tatum, developing microneedle techniques that allowed her to transplant the nuclei of one cell to another.

She returned to Rockefeller University as a senior researcher in 1971, working on cellular drug resistance and cell insertion techniques. She made important contributions to the micromanipulation of mammalian cells. She studied the displacement of chromosomes during extraction at different mitotic stages. She demonstrated the precise fusion of mammalian somatic cells using microsurgery in 1972. She was made head of the Cytobiology Laboratory in 1975 after Tatum died unexpectedly. She was unable to raise funding for her own research. Her work with micropipettes became well known, and she worked with Dana Giulian on electrodes which could impale human cells without damage and measure the potential of a cytoplasm.

In 1979 she collaborated with William French Anderson to insert a functioning gene into a defective cell within a living mouse, correcting a genetic defect. Her microsurgical techniques opened new paths to curing medical conditions. They conducted their first ever experiment on a human 11 years later. She lectured at the Pasteur Institute in 1981.

Diacumakos died of a heart attack on June 11, 1984.
