= Elaine Saunders (scientist) =

Engineer, audiologist, inventor and researcher

- Born: 1954
- Education: University of Manchester
- Scientific career
- Workplaces: Swinburne University

Elaine Saunders (born 1954) is an associate professor at the Swinburne University of Technology and executive director of Blamey Saunders, as well as an inventor, entrepreneur. She was elected a Fellow of the Australian Academy of Science Technology and Engineering in 2019. She is one of only nine women out of 160 to win the Clunies Ross award for entrepreneurship, and has won many other awards, as well as given numerous keynote addresses on the value of entrepreneurship and innovation in STEMM.

== Early life and career ==
Saunders' career is based on helping relieve the burden of people who have hearing loss. She co-founded the hearing aid company, Blamey Saunders Hears, with Professor Peter Blamey. She currently works at Swinburne University and the Bionics Institute. She has described how she was inspired to work in hearing as her father was deaf.

" I was inspired to do that as a missionary entrepreneur kind of thing because my dad was deaf and I saw how he just wanted good hearing aids. The technology just wasn’t good enough. That got me working with deaf kids as a volunteer. I thought the problem there was even worse. I didn’t really know how you could address the problem, but I was really interested to work in the field. Then, when I think about it all the jobs that I’ve had since my first career jobs, I was always the first appointee, so I was always quite entrepreneurial in them."

Saunders is the head of an audiology clinic team who work in audiology and research on hearing aids. The team has launched an online hearing test that conducts analysis of hearing for speech sounds.

Saunders also was a co-founder and CEO of the company "Dynamic Hearing", (which later became Cirrus Logic), which focused on supplying digital signal processing for ultra-low power chips as part of products which include Bluetooth headsets and hearing aids.

== Education ==
Saunders obtained a BSc (Hon) in chemical physics from the University of Manchester, England. She then obtained a master's degree in clinical audiology, also at the University of Manchester, and then a PhD in biomedical engineering from the University of Southampton. She worked within England, with positions as a clinical audiologist and lecturer in audiology. She then moved back to Australia in 1984 and subsequently worked as a clinical and research audiologist.

== STEMM careers and advocacy ==
Saunders is an advocate of using education and training in STEMM in biotechnical careers, and has appeared and spoken at many STEMM careers events, encouraging others to 'use STEMM to do good in the world'. She has also given presentations about the benefit of STEMM careers to students and parents of students. She is also an advocate of Women in STEMM and encouraging women to study, and work in STEMM. Saunders has been involved with supporting and mentoring many women in STEMM careers, from early to mid-career researchers.

== Awards and prizes ==
Saunders was one of the only nine women of the 160 winners of the Clunies Ross award for inventors and entrepreneurs. She has won numerous other prizes including:

- Fellow of the Academy of Science and Technology and Engineering (2019).
- BioMelbourne Network's inaugural Women in Leadership Award (2015).
- Asia's Leading Woman in Healthcare (2011).
- Victorian Pearcey Entrepreneur Award (2011).
- American Academy of Audiology's Award for Achievement in Industry (2010).
- Melbourne Award for Contribution to Community by an Individual (2012).
- AFR Australia's 100 most influential women (2015).
- Clunies Ross Entrepreneur of the Year award (2016).

== Works ==
Saunders was co-author with John Bamford of Hearing Impairment, Auditory Perception, and Language Sisability, first published in 1985 by E. Arnold, with a second edition in 1991 by Whurr Publishers.

Saunders was a co-producer of a play, The Sound of Waves performed in 2014 in Melbourne. The play was centred around the life experience and story of a girl who is profoundly deaf (played by Jodie Harris). The protagonist of the play was a trial patient who received a cochlear implant in 1999.

Her autobiography, Sounds of Silence, was published by New Holland in 2015. In 2019 the book she edited, Tele-audiology and the Optimization of Hearing Health Care Delivery, was published by Hershey.
