= Patricia Duffy =

American politician

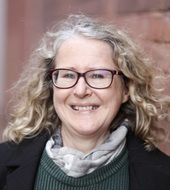

Member of the Massachusetts House of Representatives from the 5th Hampden district
- Incumbent
- Assumed office January 6, 2021
- Preceded by: Aaron Vega

Personal details
- Born: August 8, 1963 (age 62) San Pedro, Los Angeles, California, U.S.
- Party: Democratic
- Spouse: Joe Paul (m. 2014)
- Education: University of Massachusetts Amherst (B.A.); Tufts University; University of Georgia (M.A.)
- Website: Official website

Patricia A. Duffy is an American state representative for the 5th Hampden District seat in Massachusetts, which includes Holyoke. She was born in California and moved to Massachusetts aged eight.

== Political career ==
Duffy was elected in 2020. She won a three-way Democratic primary in 2020 then faced no Republican challenger in the general. Before running she was the legislative aid to her predecessor Aaron Vega. In 2002 she ran for and lost the state representative seat in the 2nd Hampshire seat.

== Committees ==
- House Committee on Global Warming and Climate Change
- Joint Committee on Cannabis Policy
- Joint Committee on Health Care Financing
- Joint Committee on Higher Education
- Joint Committee on Veterans and Federal Affairs

== See also ==
- 2021–2022 Massachusetts legislature
