= Holyoke Civic Symphony =

Orchestra in Massachusetts, USA

- Orchestra
- Former name: Holyoke Community College Civic Orchestra
- Founded: 1967; 58 years ago
- Location: Holyoke, Massachusetts, US
- Concert hall: Leslie Phillips Theater, Fine and Performing Arts (FPA) Building, Holyoke Community College
- Principal conductor: David Kidwell
- Website: www.holyokecivicsymphony.org

The Holyoke Civic Symphony is an American orchestra based in Holyoke, Massachusetts. It performs at Leslie Philips Theater on the Holyoke Community College campus. Originally established as the Holyoke Community College Civic Orchestra in 1967, it is still closely tied to the community college, but changed its name in the 1980s, becoming a separate non-profit entity by the 1991–1992 season. The orchestra, primarily composed of amateur musicians, has a stated mission to promote access to music for the residents of the region and every season, 3 of its 4 concerts are free to attend.
