= Elaine Nicpon Marieb =

American anatomist

- Born: April 5, 1936; Northampton, Massachusetts
- Died: December 20, 2018 (aged 82); Naples, Florida
- Education: Holyoke Community College, Fitchburg State College, Mount Holyoke College, University of Massachusetts at Amherst
- Occupations: Writer, Scientist
- Parents: Francis Joseph Nicpon (father); Evelyn Rose (Pelkey) Nicpon (mother)

Elaine Nicpon Marieb was a human anatomist and the author of many textbooks, most notably Human Anatomy & Physiology, Essentials of Human Anatomy And Physiology, and Essentials of Human Anatomy & Physiology Lab Manual (3rd Edition).

== Early life ==
Marieb was born on April 5, 1936, in Northampton, Massachusetts. She grew up on her family's farm. Marieb was a nontraditional student; she earned her bachelor's degree at Westfield State College at age 28. She later earned a master's degree in biology at Mount Holyoke College and a Ph.D. in zoology at the University of Massachusetts Amherst. In 1969, Marieb began working as a teacher at Holyoke Community College, and then at Holyoke Junior College.

== Career ==
Marieb started her teaching career at Springfield College and then in Holyoke Community College from 1969 (formerly known as Holyoke Junior College) until she retired in 1993 to devote herself to writing. Marieb donated to HCC Foundation starting in 1986. Her donation exceeded $1.5 million in 2019, making her the biggest benefactor in the annual student scholarship program and faculty award. She also made a record setting donation of $21.5 million to The UMass Amherst College of Nursing. The UMass Amherst College of Nursing will also be renamed “The Elaine Marieb College of Nursing” following the donation.

Marieb was a self-described "accidental author," as she had authored only a few journal articles before beginning her work reviewing textbook manuscripts for Addison-Wesley in the 1970s. While writing those articles, she decided to write a laboratory manual, which became the most widely used lab manual in colleges and universities across the United States, soon after it was published in 1981.

Marieb then set out to write what would become her magnum opus—her human anatomy and physiology textbook, Human Anatomy & Physiology. The textbook was published in 1989 and took off with both instructors and students.

Marieb was best known for her textbooks on anatomy and physiology. She enrolled in Holyoke Community College's nursing program to better understand the concerns of those nurses, in 1980 graduating with an associate degree. She got her bachelor's in nursing from Fitchburg State College, and a master's in nursing and gerontology from the University of Massachusetts.

== Death ==
Elaine Nicpon Marieb died at the age of 82 on December 20, 2018, in Naples, Florida of complications due to Parkinson's disease.

== Legacy ==
In 2016, Time magazine named its "100 Most-Read Female Writers in College Classes." Just below authors such as Jane Austen, Toni Morrison, Mary Shelley, and Virginia Woolf, Marieb ranked 7. Around the world, her books are assigned in more than 2,400 classrooms, and some students now study in the college that bears her name at Florida Gulf Coast University.

In 2021, her foundation made a $21.5 million donation to one of her many schools, the College of Nursing at the University of Massachusetts Amherst, the largest donation to the school to this date. As a result, the school was named after her as the Elaine N. Marieb College of Nursing.

Marieb had a knack for teaching human anatomy and physiology. She taught this, among other subjects, at Springfield College and Holyoke Community College for years, and she eventually wrote down her methods. She published more than a dozen textbooks.
