= Aaron Vega =

American politician

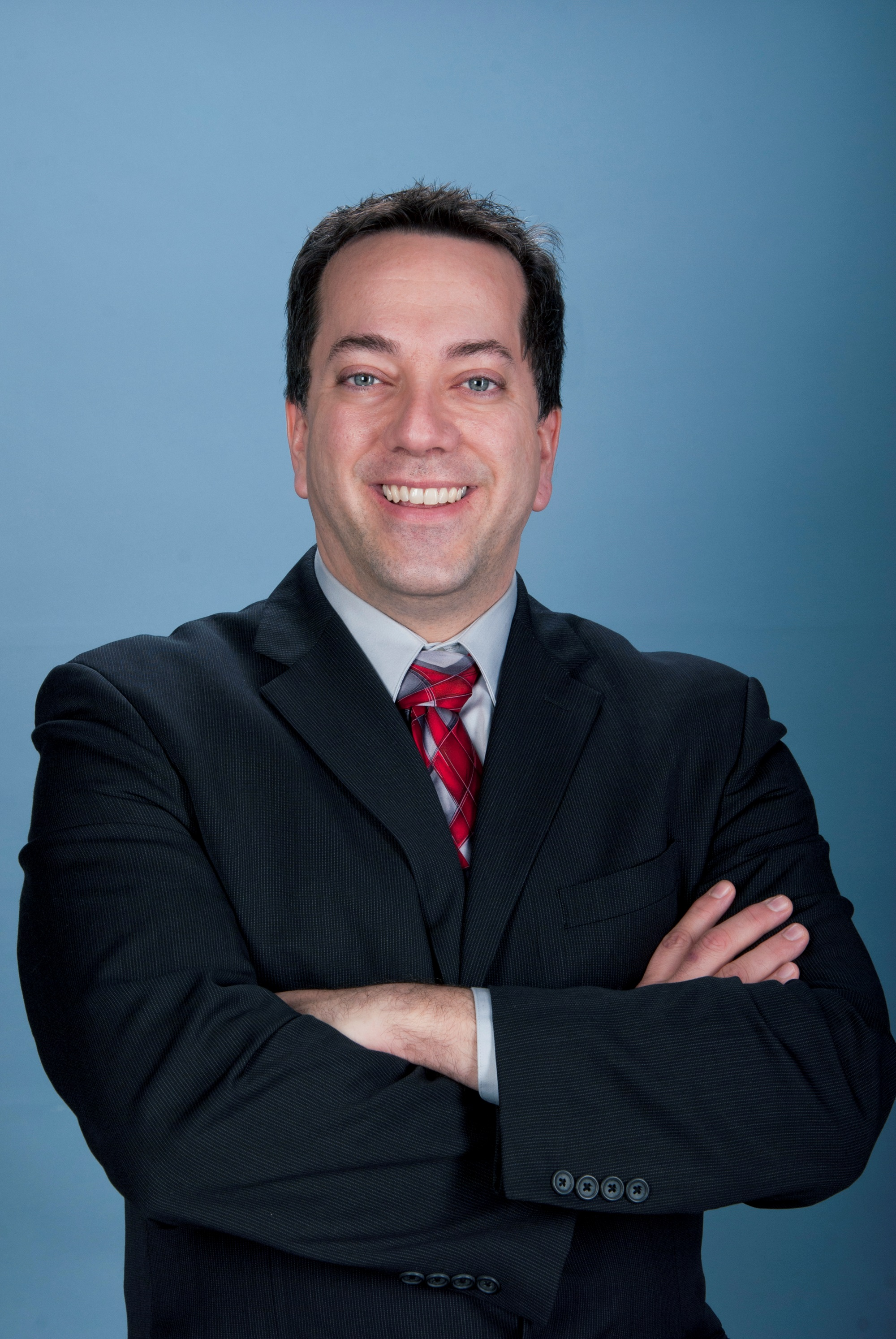
- Vega, c. 2018

Member of the Massachusetts House of Representatives from the 5th Hampden district
- In office January 2, 2013 – January 6, 2021
- Preceded by: Michael F. Kane
- Succeeded by: Patricia Duffy

Member of the Holyoke City Council from the at-large district
- In office 2010–2012

Personal details
- Born: August 15, 1970 (age 56) Holyoke, Massachusetts, U.S.
- Party: Democratic
- Spouse: Debra Vega (m. 2006)
- Children: 4
- Education: Holyoke Community College; Keene State College (BA, MA)
- Occupation: Small business owner, yoga instructor, film editor
- Website: Official website Campaign website

Aaron Vega (born August 15, 1970) is an American state legislator who previously represented the 5th Hampden district of the Massachusetts House of Representatives, co-owner of a yoga business, and a former film editor. He has been nominated for the Argentine Film Critics Association's Silver Condor Award for Best Film for directing jazz documentary Van Van - Empezó la fiesta!, and has worked on several PBS documentaries including American Experience and Ken Burns' Jazz. A member of the Democratic Party, Vega began his political career in 2009 when he successfully ran as a city councilor in Holyoke, and subsequently ran successfully for state representative for the 5th Hampden district in 2012. In 2020, then-Mayor Alex Morse appointed Vega as Director of the City of Holyoke's Office of Planning and Economic Development, replacing outgoing director Marcos Marrero; Vega assumed the office on January 21, 2021, and would subsequently lead Mayor Josh Garcia's transition team.

== Personal life ==
The son of local Ecuadorian activist and cofounder of Nueva Esperanza, Carlos Vega, Aaron Vega was born in Holyoke on August 15, 1970, and grew up in South Holyoke, attending Morgan Elementary School, before moving with his mother to New Hampshire. He graduated from Mascenic Regional High School in 1988, and soon after attended Holyoke Community College and subsequently Keene State College where he received dual bachelor's degrees in psychology and film studies. Over the next several years he worked as an editor on a number of PBS documentaries, including several directed by Ken Burns, before returning to Holyoke in 2002. In 2008, Vega opened a yoga studio with his wife in the converted Lyman Mills, now known as Open Square, becoming a mobile yoga service in 2017. Vega resides in Holyoke with his wife Debra, who teaches dance at Mount Holyoke College, his three daughters, and son. He is a member of the board of the Carlos Vega Fund for Social Justice.

== Selected filmography ==
Vega has worked as an editor for a number of films, primarily human interest stories told through documentaries. He is credited as the film editor of the following works, unless otherwise noted

- Refugee Kids: One Small School Takes on the World, 2014, short
- Héroes, 2011, TV movie (Puerto Rico), director
- Sosúa: Make a Better World, 2009, documentary
- American Experience

- A Class Apart, 2009
- Race to the Moon, 2005

- Artists of the Bahamas, 2008, documentary edited with Scott Hancock
- Through Deaf Eyes, 2007, documentary
- Clock Paint Eyeball, 2006, short, edited with Chris Ohlson
- My Electric Bill, 2006, short
- Addison's Wall, 2005, drama
- Front Wards, Back Wards, 2005, documentary
- The Spin Cycle, 2004, short
- Blue Vinyl, 2002, post-production coordinator
- The New Sideshow, 2002, TV movie
- Ram Dass, Fierce Grace, 2001, documentary
- Jazz (TV series), 2001, 3 episodes

- The True Welcome: 1929-1934
- The Gift: 1917-1924
- Gumbo: Beginnings to 1917

- Van Van - Empezó la fiesta!, 2001, director with Liliana Mazure, documentary, nominated for 2002 Silver Condor Award for Best Film
- Lewis & Clark: The Journey of the Corps of Discovery, 1997, assistant editor

== Massachusetts House of Representatives (2013–2021) ==
Vega ran for the Massachusetts House of Representative's 5th Hampden District legislative seat, which was made vacant upon the resignation of incumbent state representative Michael F. Kane who accepted a position with Columbia Gas of Massachusetts. He defeated the Republican nominee Ward 5 City Councilor Linda M. Vacon and Green-Rainbow nominee Jerome T. Hobert and was sworn in on January 2, 2013. He is a member of the Massachusetts Black and Latino Legislative Caucus.

=== Committee assignments ===
- Committee on Personnel and Administration
- Joint Committee on Economic Development and Emerging Technologies
- Joint Committee on Higher Education

== Electoral history ==
Massachusetts House of Representatives, 5th Hampden District, 2018:

- Aaron Vega (D) – 10,199 (99.6%)
- All Others – 38 (0.4%)
- Blank Votes – 2,214

Massachusetts House of Representatives, 5th Hampden District, 2016:

- Aaron Vega (D) – 13,687 (99.7%)
- All Others – 40 (0.3%)
- Blank Votes – 3,312

Massachusetts House of Representatives, 5th Hampden District, 2012:

- Aaron Vega (D) – 9,545 (60.8%)
- Linda Vacon (R) – 3,211 (20.5%)
- Jermone Hobert (Green-Rainbow) – 2,939 (18.7%)

Democratic primary for the Massachusetts House of Representatives, 5th Hampden District, 2012:

- Aaron Vega – 1,947 (65.4%)
- Michael F. Kane (inc.) – 999 (33.6%)

Holyoke City Council, At-large, 2011:

- Kevin Jourdain (inc.) – 5,029
- Peter Tallman – 4,834
- Aaron Vega (inc.) – 4,697
- Joseph McGiverin (inc.) – 4,675
- Brenna Murphy (inc.) – 4,528
- Daniel Bresnahan – 4,264
- James Leahy (inc.) – 4,252
- Rebecca Lisi – 4,213
- Patricia Devine (inc.) – 3,886
- John Whelihan – 3,675
- Yasser Menwer – 1,706

== See also ==
- 2019–2020 Massachusetts legislature
