= Joe Peters =

American glass artist

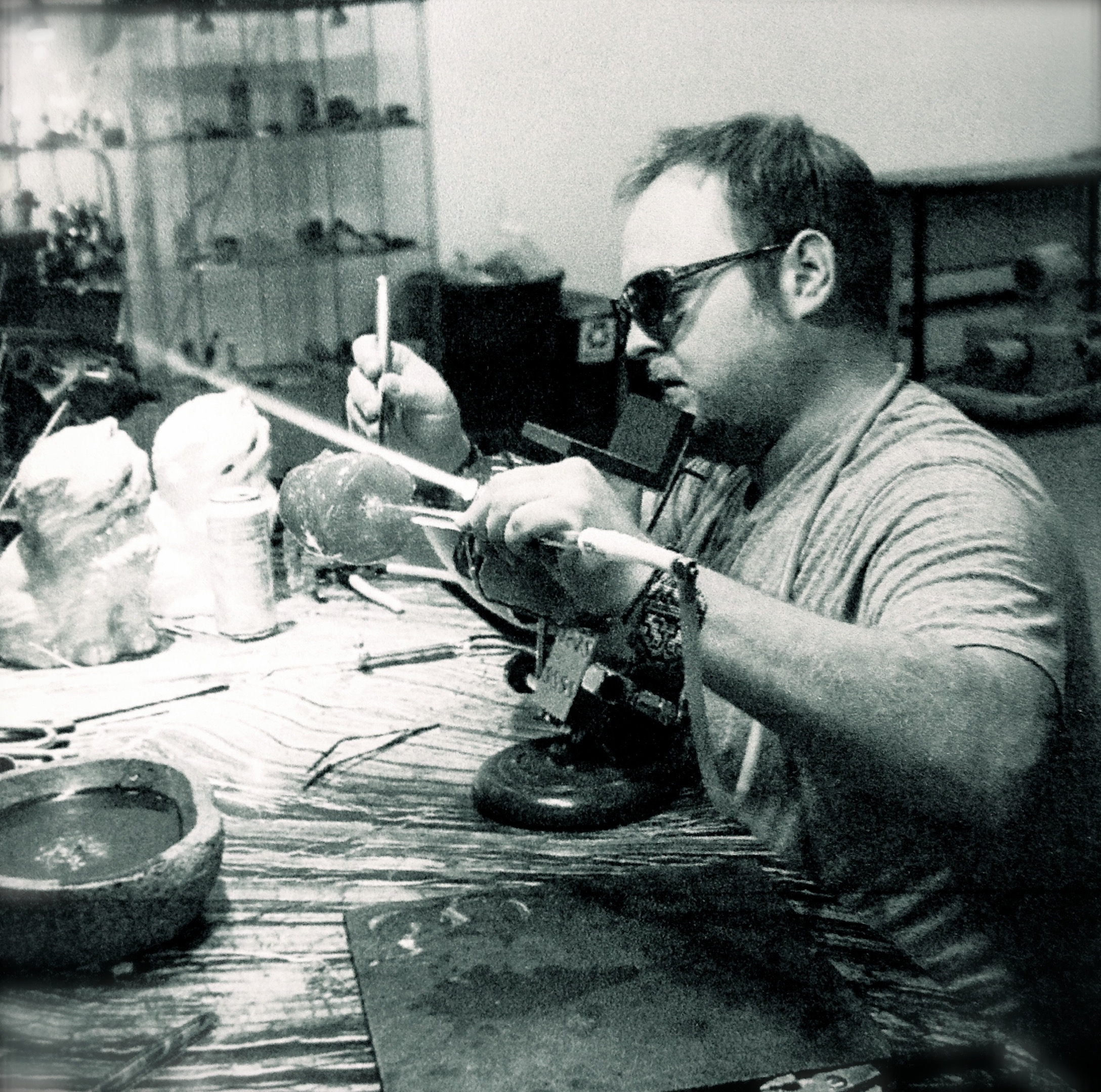
- Joe Peters working at Everdream Studio, 2014
- Born: Joseph Quinn Peters; November 25, 1983 (age 41); Springfield, Massachusetts, U.S.
- Education: Holyoke Community College, Snow Farm
- Known for: Glass artist
- Awards: NICHE Award 2011, (with Peter Muller) NICHE Award 2013

Joseph Quinn Peters (born November 25, 1983) is an American glass artist who specializes in the sculpture of natural life-forms. An avid scuba diver, Joe has been heavily influenced by wildlife and the natural world. His solo work and collaborations have been featured in galleries and museums across the United States including Corning Museum Gallery, Monterey Bay Aquarium, Pismo Gallery, Hodgell Gallery, and Dane Gallery.

== Biography ==
Born in Springfield, Massachusetts, Peters was active in the local art scene at a young age. While attending Holyoke Community College, Peters began glassblowing and later studied flameworking at Snow Farm, a craft school based in Williamsburg, Massachusetts. Peters later became established as a flameworking teacher, teaching at Snow Farm, Corning Glass Museum, and the Penland School of Craft.

== Influences ==
Peters attributes the greatest influence on his work to be from glass artists Robert Michelson and Vittorio Costantini, while he is most impressed by contemporary artists Buck and Banjo. Peters also draws on instruction from glass artists such as Robert Burch, Sally Prasch, Milon Townsend, Robert Mickelsen, and Emilio Santini.

== Works ==
Peters began selling glass pendants and beads at local craft shows, Peters later expanded his work to include sculpture for sale at galleries.

=== Collaborations ===
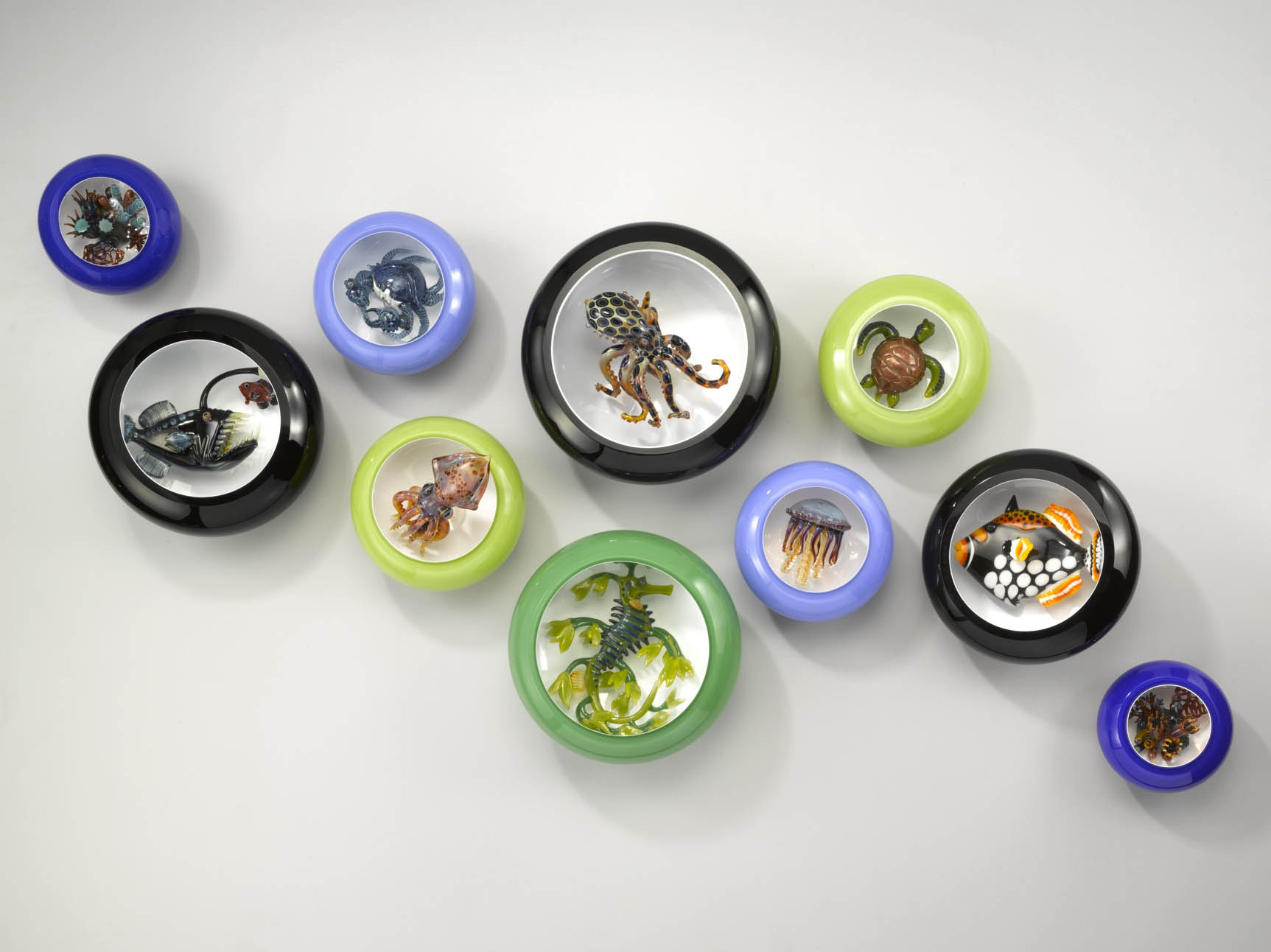
Joe Peters and Peter Muller collaboration 2009

In 2005, Joe Peters and Peter Muller met at Snowfarm. Furnace and Flame, a collaboration between the two artists, began in 2008. Their collaborative works have received several awards.

=== Functional work ===
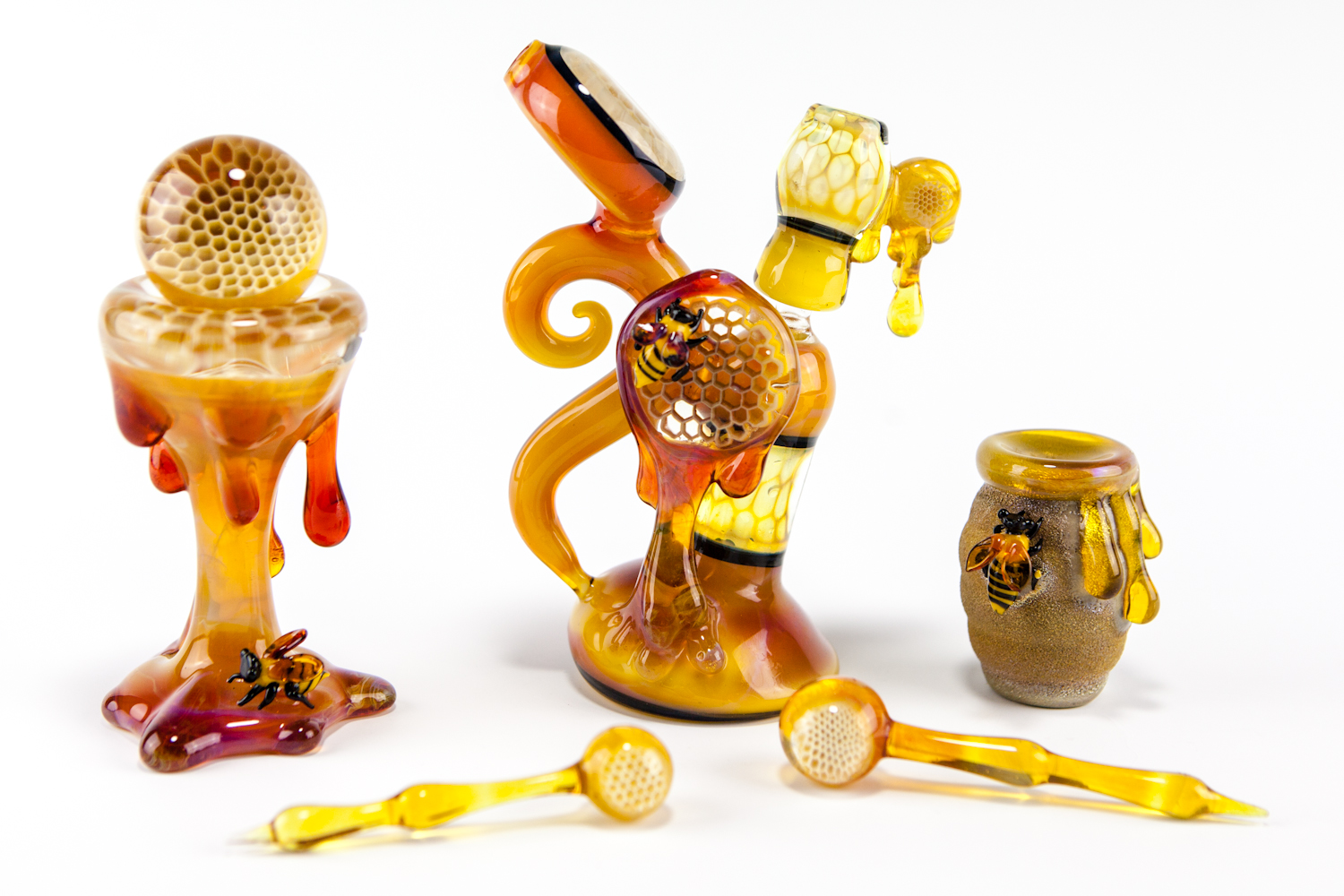
Joe Peters Functional Bubbler, Marble and Dish Set 2013

In 2012, encouraged by growing international demand from private collectors and galleries, Peters created work that was increasingly inclusive of functional glass components. In order to be closer to the glass community and to do more collaborative work, Peters relocated to Evergreen, Colorado, where he joined the Everdream Studio with other flameworkers, N8, Adam G, WJC, Elbo, and Eusheen. On his own and through collaborative engagements, Peters continues to create pieces for glass enthusiasts worldwide. His functional glass works were featured in his show at GooseFire Gallery in Los Angeles, CA in 2013. Peters has created an aquarium that is on display at the Boston Children's Hospital as of 2012.

=== Selected exhibitions ===
Exhibition	Location	Date
American Craft Council	Baltimore, MD	2010, 2011
One of a Kind Show- Pier 91	New York, NY	2010, 2011
American Craft	Chicago, IL	2010, 2011
Goosefire Galleries	Los Angeles, CA	2013
Front St. Gallery	Philadelphia, PA	2014
Contemporary Pipemaking - Art Basel	Miami, FL	2014
