= Evelyn Chesky =

American politician

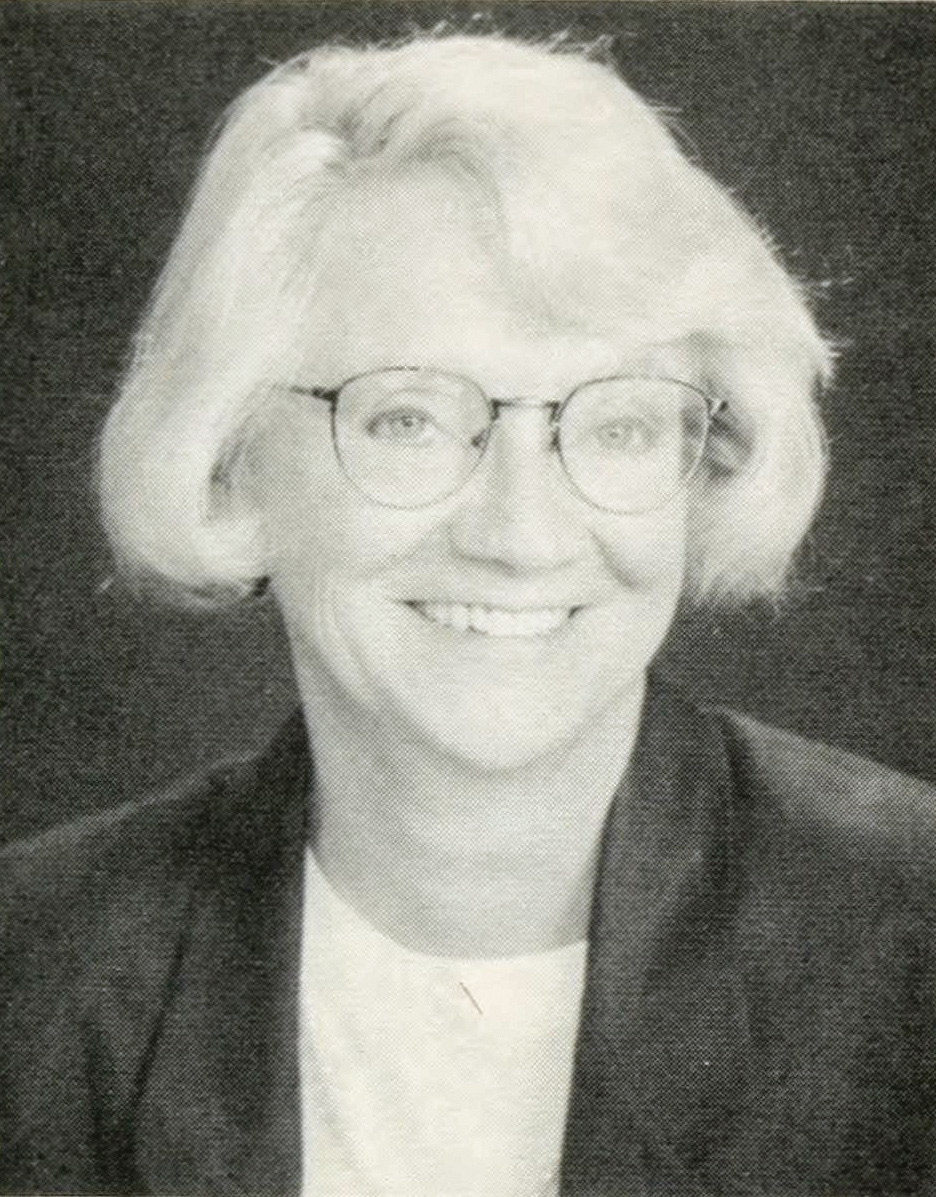
- Portrait of Rep. Chesky during her tenure on Beacon Hill, c. 1995

Member of the Massachusetts House of Representatives from the 5th Hampden District
- In office 1993–2001
- Preceded by: Robert Rohan
- Succeeded by: Michael F. Kane

Personal details
- Born: August 20, 1933 Chicopee, Massachusetts
- Died: May 19, 2025 (aged 91)
- Party: Democratic
- Education: Chicopee High School
- Occupation: Businesswoman; Politician

Evelyn G. Chesky (August 20, 1933 - May 19, 2025) was an American politician who represented the 5th Hampden District in the Massachusetts House of Representatives from 1993 to 2001. Prior to becoming a State Representative she was a member of the Holyoke Board of Aldermen.
