= Paul Boland =

American impressionist, singer and announcer (born 1960/61)

- Born: Paul Edward Boland Jr. 1960 or 1961 (age 63–64)
- Occupation(s): Singer, impressionist, announcer
- Years active: 1985–present
- Spouse: Marlise Ricardos (m. 1993)
- Children: 1
- Website: http://www.paulboland.com/ at the Wayback Machine (archived October 8, 2007)

Paul Edward Boland Jr. (born 1960 or 1961) is an American impressionist, singer, and announcer.

Raised in Springfield, Massachusetts, Boland began his career as an actor in community theater in Lomita, California. He performed on Rick Dees' TV show Into the Night Starring Rick Dees in 1990 and was the announcer for the 1998 revival of Match Game. While Rod Roddy was receiving cancer treatment, Boland filled in as announcer on The Price Is Right in 2002.

Since around the 1990s, Boland has performed as an impressionist on cruise ships, including for Cunard Line but mostly for Royal Caribbean Group. He routinely impersonates Elvis Presley and is able to imitate over 100 characters including Frank Sinatra, the Beatles, and Kermit the Frog.

== Early life and early career ==
Paul Edward Boland Jr. was born in 1960 or 1961 to Paul Boland Sr. and Christine Boland and was raised in Springfield, Massachusetts. He received a high school diploma in 1978 from Cathedral High School and was a theater major at Holyoke Community College.

Boland played Lancelot in the musical Camelot at El Camino College in 1986. Theater critic Bill Dorsett wrote in the Daily Breeze, "Boland makes his first entrance and before he can say 'moi' he has the audience in his pocket." He played the revolutionary Norman Cornell in the Neil Simon comedy The Star-Spangled Girl in a 1985 Chapel Theater run in Lomita, California. The critic Dorsett said that "Boland plays Norman very low-key during the opening scenes, but quickly warms up to the level of the rest of the cast. Boland has some of the best comedy business in the show, and most of the time he handles himself very well on stage." Boland assumed the role of F. Sherman in the Bill Manhoff comedy The Owl and the Pussycat in 1986 for Chapel Theater. Daily Breeze reviewer James Bronson criticized his performance, writing, "Boland is low-key – in fact, too low key – through much of the play. And he doesn't show an inherent comedic sense, which keeps the play flat." At the Lomita restaurant and nightclub Seymour Hamms in 1986, Boland acted as the baron Cletis T. Fullernoy in the James McLure play Lone Star. Daily Breeze reviewer Bill Dorsett wrote that Boland "proves his versatility in the nerdy role" since within the last year, he "has given memorable performances in The Star Spangled Girl, Camelot and now Lone Star playing three very different characters expertly."

At Seymour Hamms in 1987, Boland produced and staged the musical show "Be-Bop-A-Lula" that showcased music from the 1950s and 1960s. Boland hosted a 2.5-hour musical show, "A Tribute to Neil Diamond", in 1988 at Seymour Hamms. Daily Breeze reviewer Shari Okamoto found that "Saturday's show wasn't perfect, but it was a flattering tribute to Diamond and rousing entertainment for people not familiar with his work."

== Career ==
Boland performed an impersonation sketch with Gregg Binkley on an episode of Rick Dees' TV show Into the Night Starring Rick Dees in 1990. While dressed up like Elvis Presley, Boland imitated the voices of Presley, Jim Ignatowski in the TV series Taxi, and Kermit the Frog. After singing part of "My Way" in Presley's voice, for the rest of the song, he imitated 17 people in total such as Dudley Moore, Richard Dreyfuss, Sonny Bono, Cher, and Jack Nicholson. The New York Times reviewer John J. O'Connor called Boland's and Binkley's performances the "best bit". Writing in the Orange County Register, critic Ray Richmond stated, "this Elvis (actually actor Paul Boland) was no ordinary Elvis imposter. For one, he was pretty good." Calling Boland an Elvis look-alike, The Seattle Times's John Voorhees found that he "proved to be a great impersonator" in his Into the Night Starring Rick Dees appearance.

Boland performed for the Apollo Theater Chicago show "Al Anthony's Salute to the Superstars" in 1991. In a positive review, Chicago Tribune theater critic Richard Christiansen wrote that the show was "strictly phony, but at least the phoniness is genuine and unpretentious" and said of Boland's performance, "When Paul Boland, not even looking or particularly singing like Elvis Presley, comes on and does an amiably offhand, what-the-hell turn as The King, the mature ladies who chat and dance with him no doubt feel they are in the presence of a real rocker." He performed at The Mirage on the Las Vegas Strip around 1992.

He was the game show announcer for the 1998 revival of Match Game. Boland performed song impersonations at a Ray Charles concert in San Diego in 1999. The San Diego Union-Tribune music critic Mikel Toombs had a negative review of Boland's work, writing, "Some of Boland's bits had an entertaining familiarity – and some didn't, which is death to an impressionist – but his lack of imagination showed why he's stuck on TV hosting a recycled game show ("The New Match Game")."

Boland performed on the Cunard Line's cruise ship Queen Elizabeth 2 in 1999. In a review of Boland's performance, The Gazette columnist Gus Schrader wrote, "We enjoyed Boland the most. He is a versatile young man you probably will be seeing on TV - or maybe already have. He rivaled impressionist Rich Little with his clever lines as he imitated famous people, mostly singers." He filled in for announcer Rod Roddy on The Price Is Right in 2002 during Roddy's cancer operations. After Roddy died, Boland auditioned to become announcer, but Rich Fields received the role. George Hamilton called Boland "the very best there is" and Wayne Newton said he is "one of the greatest entertainers I know".

Boland performed for a fundraiser at the St. John Fisher Parish School in Rancho Palos Verdes, California, in 2008. The journalist Frank Brown wrote, "He gave a non-stop, athletic performance singing in his own voice and accurately imitating more than two dozen of the country's top pop and even country and western singers. He added a repertoire of amusing bits of costume and wigs, one of the funniest of which proved to be Willie Nelson." According to a 2013 article, Paul and his wife Marlise Boland, a musical theater actress, have performed on cruise ships for two decades. The duo have been entertainers primarily for the Royal Caribbean Group. During his performances, Boland imitates 100 people including Frank Sinatra, Elvis Presley, and the Beatles. Boland performed at the Sun Lakes Friendship Club in Banning, California, in 2019. Imitating the voices of Louis Armstrong, Ray Romano, Jerry Seinfeld, Jimmy Stewart, Robin Williams, Boland performed "It's a Wonderful World". In his rendition of "I Got You Babe", he put on a wig that had Sonny Bono on one side and Cher on the other.

== Personal life ==
Boland married Marlise Sharleen Ricardos at the Mary Star of the Sea Catholic Church in San Pedro, Los Angeles, in 1993. Ricardos had won the Miss California title in 1988. The couple live in Los Angeles and have a daughter.
