= Henry P. Monaghan =

American legal scholar (1934–2025)

- Born: May 26, 1934; Holyoke, Massachusetts, U.S.
- Died: January 1, 2025 (aged 90)
- Awards: American Academy of Arts and Sciences (1988)

Academic background
- Education: Holyoke Junior College (AA); University of Massachusetts (BA); Yale University (LLB); Harvard University (LLM)

Academic work
- Discipline: Constitutional law
- Institutions: Boston University; Columbia University

Henry Paul Monaghan (May 26, 1934 – January 1, 2025) was an American legal scholar. He was the Harlan Fiske Stone Professor of Constitutional Law at Columbia Law School from 1988 to 2019.

== Life and career ==
Monaghan was born in Holyoke, Massachusetts, on May 26, 1934. He graduated from Holyoke Junior College in 1953, and received his Bachelor of Arts from the University of Massachusetts in 1955. He received his Bachelor of Laws from Yale Law School in 1958 and a Master of Laws from Harvard Law School in 1960.

Monaghan joined the Columbia Law School faculty in 1984. His scholarship focused on constitutional law and federal courts. In 2018, he received the inaugural Daniel J. Meltzer Award from the Association of American Law Schools for his scholarship on the federal courts. His students included Columbia Law School professor Gillian E. Metzger and Dean of New York University School of Law Trevor Morrison.

He also argued a number of cases in state courts and three times before the Supreme Court of the United States. His views are sometimes considered conservative, though he was a self-described Democrat.

Monaghan was named a fellow of the American Academy of Arts and Sciences in 1988.

Monaghan died on January 1, 2025, at the age of 90.

== Views on Article V ==
In 1988 and again in 1994, when Akhil Reed Amar argued that Article V of the U.S. Constitution was not intended as the exclusive amendment mechanism for the United States Constitution and used popular sovereignty as one of the justifications and rationales for his position on this issue, Amar's position in regards to this was heavily criticized by Henry Paul Monaghan, who argued that there is a lack of historical evidence and historical precedents for Amar's position, argued that Amar's position makes Article V itself superfluous (thus violating the canon against surplusage) since virtually no one would ever actually want to utilize the astronomically more demanding Article V amendment process if a much easier national referendum process is always allegedly available on demand, and pointed out that Amar's Article V stance in regards to popular sovereignty being non-waivable and non-relinquishable is completely incompatible with Amar's stance on secession, where Amar argues that the various states of the United States not temporarily, but rather permanently, gave up some of their sovereignty by creating and joining the much larger United States of America. Monaghan also argued that since Amar himself acknowledges that there are certain decisions that he believes that even a majority of the American people should not be able to make, such as voting to abolish speech, it's difficult to argue why exactly the American people can't require a supermajority amendment process for their existing constitutional order, using the logic that constitutional changes should command more support than just a fleeting, transient, extremely narrow majority.

== Works ==
- Monaghan, Henry Paul (January 1996). "We the People[s], Original Understanding, and Constitutional Amendment". Columbia Law Review. 96 (1). Columbia Law Review Association, Inc.: 121–177. doi:10.2307/1123218. JSTOR 1123218.

== See also ==
- Bibliography of the United States Constitution
