= Michael F. Kane =

American politician (born 1967)

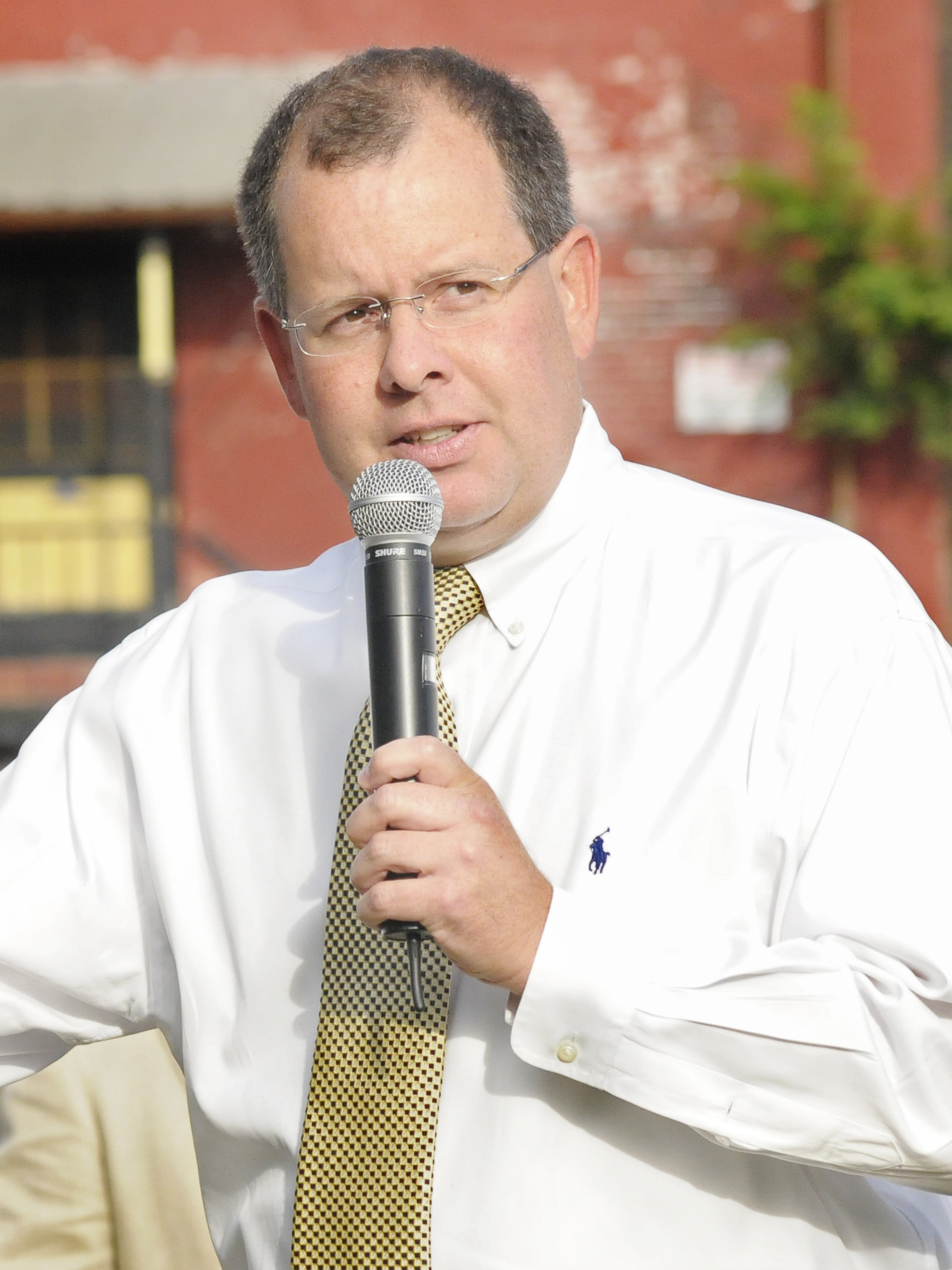
- Kane in 2008

Member of the Massachusetts House of Representatives from the 5th Hampden district
- In office 2001–2012
- Preceded by: Evelyn Chesky
- Succeeded by: Aaron Vega

Personal details
- Born: June 10, 1967 (age 59) Holyoke, Massachusetts
- Party: Democratic
- Education: Holyoke Community College; American International College
- Occupation: Politician

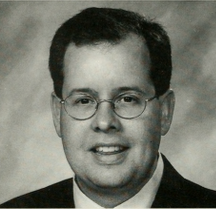
Kane in 2005

Michael F. Kane (born June 10, 1967, in Holyoke, Massachusetts) is an American politician who represented the 5th Hampden District in the Massachusetts House of Representatives and was a Holyoke City Councilor from 1996 to 2000. Kane resigned his seat on June 11, 2012, to take a job at Columbia Gas. City Councilor Aaron Vega, a Democrat, won the election to succeed him during the general election on November 6, 2012.
