= Craig Blais =

American :poet

- Born: 1978 (age 47–48); Springfield, Massachusetts, U.S.

Academic background
- Education: Holyoke Community College (AA); University of San Francisco (BA); Wichita State University (MFA); Florida State University (PhD)

Academic work
- Discipline: English
- Sub-discipline: Creative writing Poetry
- Institutions: Anna Maria College

Craig Blais (born 1978) is an American poet and academic. He was an associate professor of English at Anna Maria College.

== Early life and education ==
Blais was born in Springfield, Massachusetts. He earned an Associate of Arts in liberal arts from Holyoke Community College, a Bachelor of Art in English from the University of San Francisco, a Master of Fine Arts in creative writing from Wichita State University, and a Ph.D. in English from Florida State University.

== Career ==
Blais's first book About Crows won the 2013 Felix Pollak Prize in Poetry judged by Terrance Hayes and published by the University of Wisconsin Press. About Crows was awarded gold medal in the category of poetry in the 2014 Florida Book Awards competition. His second book Moon News was selected by former Poet Laureate of the United States Billy Collins as finalist for the Miller Williams Poetry Prize, to be published by the University of Arkansas Press in 2021.

His poems have appeared in Best New Poets, The Antioch Review, Barrow Street, Hayden's Ferry Review, Los Angeles Review, New Welsh Review, The Southern Review, and other places. He is associate professor of English at Anna Maria College in Paxton, Massachusetts.

== Works ==
- About Crows (2013)
- Moon News (2021)
