= WCCH =

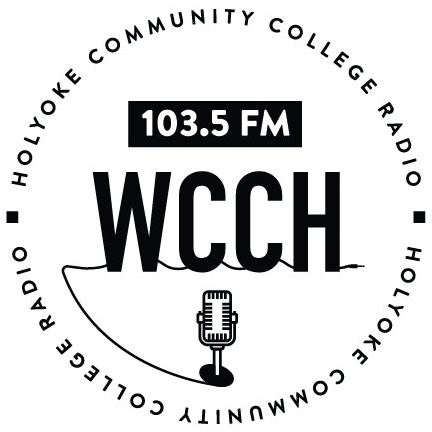
- Holyoke, Massachusetts; United States
- Frequency: 103.5 MHz
- Branding: WCCH 103.5

Programming
- Format: College Radio

Ownership
- Owner: Holyoke Community College

History
- First air date: November 1977
- Call sign meaning: "Community College, Holyoke"

Technical information
- Licensing authority: FCC
- Facility ID: 27526
- Class: D
- ERP: 9 watts
- HAAT: 79.0 meters (259.2 ft)
- Transmitter coordinates: 42°11′55.00″N 72°38′27.00″W

Links
- Public license information: Public file; LMS
- Webcast: Listen live
- Website: wcch1035.com

WCCH (103.5 FM) is a low-power college radio station broadcasting in the Holyoke, Massachusetts, United States, area. The station is owned by Holyoke Community College. WCCH airs a variety of programming 24/7.

== See also ==
- Campus radio
- List of college radio stations in the United States
