= Match Game =

American television game show

- Logo from the 2016 ABC revival
- Also known as: The Match Game (1962–1969); Match Game 73–79 (1973–1979); Match Game PM (1975–1981)
- Created by: Frank Wayne
- Directed by: Jim Elson, Ira Skutch, Rodger Wolf, Mike Gargiulo (1962–1969); Marc Breslow (1973–1991); Randall Neece (1998–1999); Beth McCarthy-Miller (2016); Ron de Moraes (2017); Harbinder Singh (2025)
- Presented by: Gene Rayburn; Ross Shafer; Michael Burger; Alec Baldwin; Martin Short
- Announcer: Johnny Olson; Gene Wood; Paul Boland; Steve French; Donovan Corneetz
- Theme music composer: Bert Kaempfert (1962–1967); Score Productions (1967–present)
- Country of origin: United States
- No. of episodes: The Match Game: 1,760; Match Game 7x: 1,454; Match Game PM: 230; Match Game (1979–1982): 525; Match Game (1990–1991): 242; Match Game (2016–2021): 65; Match Game (2025): 8

Production
- Producers: Jean Kopelman (1962–1969); Ira Skutch (1973–1982); Jonathan Goodson, Chester Feldman (1990–1991); Kevin Belinkoff (1998–1999); Scott St. John (2016–2021)
- Running time: 22–26 minutes (1962–1999); 42–46 minutes (2016–21, 25)
- Production companies: Mark Goodson-Bill Todman Productions (1962–1982); Sojourn Productions, Inc.; (1962–1969); Celebrity Productions, Inc.; (1973–1981); The Match Game Company; (1981–1982); Mark Goodson Productions; (1990–1999); The MG Company (1990–1991); MG Productions, Inc.; (1998–1999); Triple Threat Productions (2016–present); Entertain the Brutes (2016–2021); El Dorado Pictures (2016–2021); Fremantle USA (2016–present)

Original release
- Network: NBC
- Release: December 31, 1962 – September 26, 1969
- Network: CBS
- Release: July 2, 1973 – April 20, 1979
- Network: Syndication
- Release: September 8, 1975 – September 10, 1982
- Network: ABC
- Release: July 16, 1990 – July 12, 1991
- Network: Syndication
- Release: September 21, 1998 – May 21, 1999
- Network: ABC
- Release: June 26, 2016 – July 28, 2021
- Release: July 23, 2025 – present

Related
- Match Game-Hollywood Squares Hour; Blankety Blank; Blankety Blanks

Match Game is an American television panel game show that premiered on NBC in 1962 and has been revived several times over the course of the last six decades. The game features contestants trying to match answers given by celebrity panelists to fill-in-the-blank questions. Beginning with the CBS run of the 1970s, the questions are often formed as humorous double entendres.

The Match Game in its original version ran on NBC's daytime lineup from 1962 until 1969. The show returned with a significantly changed format in 1973 on CBS (also in daytime) and became a major success, with an expanded panel, larger cash payouts, and emphasis on humor. The CBS series, referred to on-air as Match Game 73 to start – with its title updated every new year, ran until 1979 on CBS, at which point it moved to first-run syndication (without the year attached to the title, as Match Game) and ran for three more seasons, ending in 1982. Concurrently with the weekday run, from 1975 to 1981, a once-a-week fringe time version, Match Game PM, was also offered in syndication for airing just before prime time hours.

The 1973 format would be used, with varying modifications, for all future revivals. Match Game returned to NBC in 1983 as part of Match Game-Hollywood Squares Hour, then had a daytime run on ABC in 1990 and another for syndication in 1998; each of these series lasted one season. It returned to ABC in a weekly prime time edition on June 26, 2016, running as an off-season replacement series. Production ended in 2019 (with some episodes held to 2020 and 2021), but ABC again revived the show in 2025.

All versions of the series were hosted by Gene Rayburn from 1963 until 1984. The 2025 version is presented by Martin Short.

The series was a production of Mark Goodson/Bill Todman Productions, along with its successor companies, and has been franchised around the world, notably as Blankety Blank in the UK and Blankety Blanks in Australia.

In 2013, TV Guide ranked the 1973–79 CBS version of Match Game as No. 4 on its list of the 60 greatest game shows ever. It was twice nominated for the Daytime Emmy Award for Outstanding Game Show, in 1976 and 1977.

== 1962–69, NBC ==
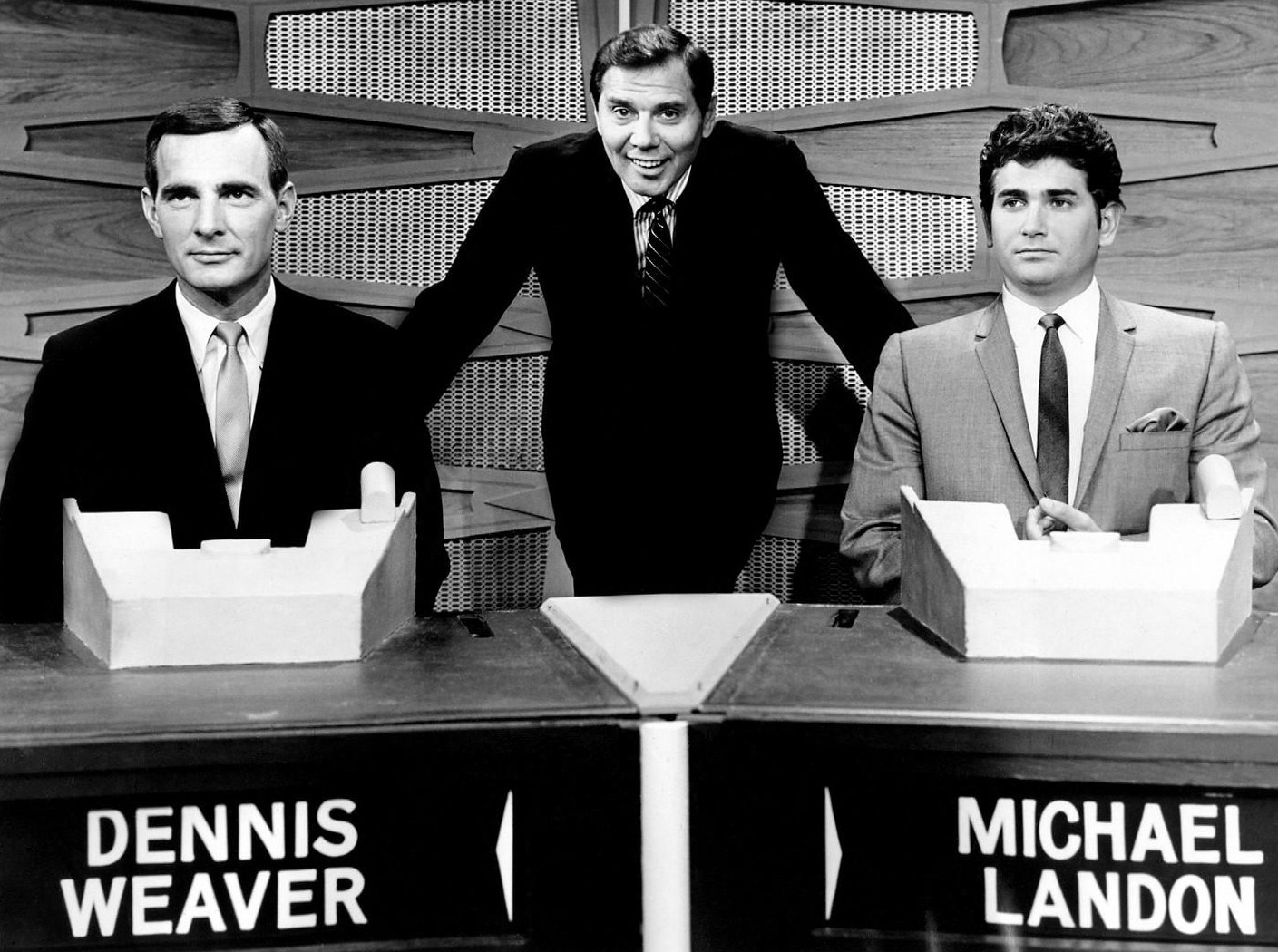
Gene Rayburn (center) hosting a prime-time Match Game special episode, 1964

The Match Game premiered on December 31, 1962. Gene Rayburn was the host, and Johnny Olson served as announcer, for the series premiere, Arlene Francis and Skitch Henderson were the two celebrity panelists. The show was taped in Studio 8H at 30 Rockefeller Plaza in New York City, NBC's largest New York studio, which since 1975 has housed Saturday Night Live, among other shows. The show originally aired in black and white, but although the studio moved to color on June 24, 1963, it continued to air in black and white until it made the switch to color on April 5, 1965.

Both teams were given a question and each player privately wrote down their response, raising their hand when done. Then each player was asked individually to reveal their response. A team scored 25 points if two teammates matched answers or 50 points if all three contestants matched. The first team to score 100 points won $100 and played the audience match, which featured three survey questions (some of which, especially after 1963, featured a numeric-answer format, e.g., "we surveyed 50 women and asked them how much they should spend on a hat," a format similar to the one that was later used on Family Feud and Card Sharks). Each contestant who agreed with the most popular answer to a question earned the team $50, for a possible total of $450.

The questions used in the game were pedestrian in nature to begin: "Name a kind of muffin," "Write down one of the words to 'Row, Row, Row Your Boat' other than 'Row,' 'Your,' or 'Boat,'" or "John loves his _____." The humor in the original series came largely from the panelists' reactions to the other answers (especially on the occasional all-star episodes). In 1963, NBC canceled the series with six weeks left to be recorded. Question writer Dick DeBartolo came up with a funnier set of questions, like "Mary likes to pour gravy all over John's _____," and submitted it to Mark Goodson. With the knowledge that the show could not be canceled again, Goodson gave the go-ahead for the more risqué-sounding questions, a decision that caused a significant boost in ratings and an "un-cancellation" by NBC.

The Match Game consistently won its time slot from 1963 to 1966 and again from April 1967 to July 1968, with its ratings allowing it to finish third among all network daytime TV game shows for the 1963–64 and 1967–68 seasons (by the latter season, NBC was the dominant network in the game show genre, ABC was not as successful and CBS had mostly dropped out of the genre). NBC also occasionally used special episodes of the series as a gap-filling program in prime time if one of its movies had an irregular time slot. Although the series still did well in the ratings (despite the popularity of ABC's horror-themed soap opera Dark Shadows), it was canceled in 1969 along with other game shows in a major daytime programming overhaul, being replaced by Letters to Laugh-In which, although a spin-off of the popular primetime series Rowan & Martin's Laugh-In, ended in just three months, on December 26.

The Match Game continued through September 26, 1969, on NBC for 1,760 episodes, airing at 4:00 p.m. Eastern (3:00 p.m. Central), running 25 minutes due to a five-minute newscast slot. Since Olson split time between New York and Miami to announce The Jackie Gleason Show, one of the network's New York staff announcers (such as Don Pardo or Wayne Howell) filled in for Olson when he could not attend a broadcast.

On February 27, 1967, the show added a "telephone match" game, in which a home viewer and a studio audience member attempted to match a simple fill-in-the-blank question, similar to the 1970s' "head-to-head match". A successful match won a jackpot, which started at $500 and increased by $100 per day until won.

Very few episodes of the 1960s The Match Game survive (see episode status below).

== Match Game 73–79 (1973–79, CBS) ==
In the early 1970s, CBS vice president Fred Silverman began overhauling the network's programming as part of what has colloquially become known as the rural purge. As part of this overhaul, the network reintroduced game shows, beginning in 1972. One of the first new offerings was The New Price Is Right, a radically overhauled version of the 1950s game show The Price Is Right. The success of The New Price Is Right prompted Silverman to commission more game shows. In the summer of 1973, Mark Goodson and Bill Todman took a similar approach in adapting The Match Game by reworking the show, moving it to Los Angeles, adding more celebrities, and increasing the amount of prize money that could be won. It was this show (along with the Bob Stewart game shows The $10,000 Pyramid, Three on a Match, Jackpot, and the Heatter-Quigley show Gambit) that reintroduced five-figure payouts for the first time since the quiz show scandals of the late 1950s.

The new version had Rayburn returning as the host and Olson returning as the announcer. The gameplay for this version had two solo contestants attempting to match the answers given by a six-celebrity panel. Richard Dawson was the first regular panelist. CBS News coverage of the Watergate hearings delayed the premiere one week from its slated date of June 25 to July 2.

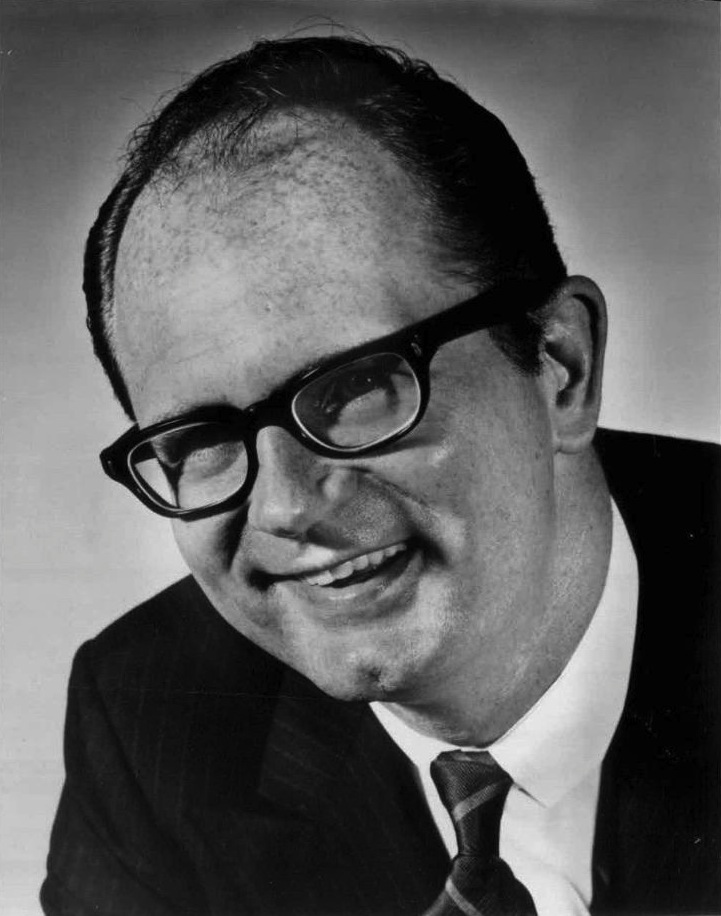
Charles Nelson Reilly (pictured in 1969) was a regular panelist from 1973 to 1991.

The first week's panelists were Dawson, Michael Landon, Vicki Lawrence, Jack Klugman, Jo Ann Pflug, and Anita Gillette. Rayburn reassured viewers of the first week of CBS shows that "This is your old favorite, updated with more action, more money, and, as you can see, more celebrities." The first few weeks of the show were somewhat different from the rest of the run. At first, many of the questions fit into the more bland and innocuous mold of the earlier seasons of the original series. In addition, many of the frequent panelists on the early episodes were not regulars later in the series but had appeared on the 1960s version, including Klugman, Arlene Francis, and Bert Convy.

However, the double entendre in the question "Johnny always put butter on his _____" marked a turning point in the questions on the show. Soon, the tone of Rayburn's questions changed notably, leaving behind the staid topics that The Match Game had first disposed of in 1963 for more risqué humor. Celebrity panelists Brett Somers (Klugman's wife at the time) and Charles Nelson Reilly began as guest panelists on the program, with Somers brought in at the request of Klugman, who felt she would make a nice fit on the program. The chemistry between Somers and Reilly prompted Goodson–Todman and CBS to hire them as regular panelists, Somers remained on the show until 1982, while Reilly continued appearing through the 1983–84 and 1990–91 revivals, with a brief break in 1974–75 when Gary Burghoff, Nipsey Russell, and Rip Taylor substituted for him. Burghoff and Russell continued to appear as semi-regular panelists afterward.

Celebrity panelists appeared in week-long blocks, due to the show's production schedule. A number of celebrities, including Betty White, Dick Martin, Marcia Wallace, Bill Daily, Fannie Flagg, Elaine Joyce, Sarah Kennedy, Patti Deutsch, Mary Wickes, Bill Anderson, and Joyce Bulifant, were semi-regular panelists, usually appearing several times a year. Celebrity panelists also included personalities from other Goodson–Todman-produced game shows, such as The Price Is Right's Bob Barker, Anitra Ford, Janice Pennington, and Holly Hallstrom and Password's Allen Ludden. The panelists were all seated in a strict order: The male guest panelist of the week, Somers, and Reilly usually sat in the top row from the viewer's left to right (occasionally a recurring panelist sat in for Somers or Reilly), and the female guest panelist of the week, Dawson (after 1978, a semi-regular male panelist), and a semi-regular female panelist (most frequently White, Flagg, Deutsch, Bulifant, or Wallace) occupied the bottom row.

=== Format ===
Two contestants competed on each episode. On the CBS version, the champion was seated in the upstage (red circle) seat and the challenger (opponent) was seated in the downstage (green triangle) seat. On the syndicated versions, which had no returning champions, positions were determined by a backstage coin toss. The object was to match the answers of the six celebrity panelists to fill-in-the-blank statements.

The main game was played in two rounds (three on Match Game PM after the first season). The opponent was given a choice of two statements labeled either "A" or "B". Rayburn read the statement, and the six celebrities wrote their answers on index cards. After they finished, the contestant verbally gave an answer. Rayburn then asked the celebrities, one at a time beginning in the upper left-hand corner of the panel, to respond with their answers.

While early questions were similar to those from the NBC version (e.g., "Every morning, John puts [blank] on his cereal"), the questions quickly became more humorous and risqué. Comedy writer Dick DeBartolo (who stayed in New York), who had participated in the 1960s Match Game, contributed broader and saucier questions. Frequently, the statements were written with bawdy, double entendre answers in mind. One example was, "Did you catch a glimpse of that girl on the corner? She has the world's biggest [blank]."

Frequently, the audience responded appropriately as Rayburn critiqued the contestant's answer. For the "world's biggest" question, Rayburn might show disdain to an answer such as "fingers" or "bag" and compliment an answer such as "rear end" or "boobs", often also commenting on the audience's approving or disapproving response. The audience usually groaned or booed when a contestant or celebrity gave a bad or inappropriate answer, whereas they cheered and applauded in approval of a good answer. Sometimes, they howled at a risqué answer. At other times, their reaction was deliberately inappropriate, such as howling at a good answer or applauding a risqué answer, to perverse effect.

The contestant earned one point for each celebrity who wrote down the same answer (or a reasonably similar one as determined by the judges; for example, "rear end" matched "bottom" or a similar euphemism), up to six points for matching everyone on the celebrity panel. After one contestant played, the second contestant played the other question.

A handful of potential answers were prohibited, the most notable being any synonym for genitalia. In instances where a celebrity gave the censorable answer, the word "Oops!" was superimposed over the index card and the celebrity's mouth, accompanied by a slide whistle masking the spoken response.

Popular questions featured a character named "Dumb Dora" or "Dumb Donald." These questions often began, "Dumb Dora/Donald is so dumb..." To this, in a routine taken from The Tonight Show Starring Johnny Carson, the audience responded en masse, "How dumb is she/he?" This expanded to the generalized question form "[adjective]-[alliterative-name] is SO [adjective]..." To this, the audience responded, "How [adjective] is he/she?" Rayburn finished the question or, occasionally, praised the audience or derided the audience's lack of union and made them try the response again. Other common subjects of questions were Superman/Lois Lane, King Kong/Fay Wray, Tarzan/Jane, The Lone Ranger/Tonto, panelists on the show (most commonly Brett Somers), politicians, and Howard Cosell. Questions also often featured characters such as "Ugly Edna" (later "Ugly Ulfrea"), "Unlucky Louie/Louise," "Horrible Hannah/Hank," "Rodney Rotten," and occasionally "Voluptuous Velma".

Some questions dealt with the fictitious (and often sleazy) country of "Nerdocrumbesia" or the world's greatest salesman, who could sell anything to anyone. Other questions, usually given in the second round (or third round in Match Game PM) to allow trailing contestants to catch up quickly, hinted at more obvious answers based on the context of the question. One such question was "James Bond went to an all-night restaurant. When the waitress told him they were out of coffee, he ordered a [blank]." Because James Bond's signature drink is a martini, shaken, not stirred, the panelists and contestants were expected to choose that answer. In the most extreme cases, the questions were puns with only one answer that made sense. "Did you hear about the religious group of dentists? They call themselves the Holy [blank]" was written so that only "Molars" made sense.

Rayburn often played the action for laughs and frequently tried to read certain questions in character, such as "Old Man Periwinkle" or "Old Mrs. Pervis". He also did the same with Confucius and Count Dracula. Regular panelist Charles Nelson Reilly, a Broadway director, often responded with comments such as "I like it when you act" and "That character was really very good. Along with the other two that you do," to the amusement of the audience.

In the second round, the contestants attempted to match the celebrities whom they had not matched in the first round. On the CBS version, the challenger always began the second round (unless that contestant had matched all six stars, in which case the champion selected from the two questions available). This meant that a champion who had answered only one question could be ahead of a challenger who had played both questions, rendering the final question moot. On the syndicated versions, the leader after a round played first in the next round. In case of a tie score, the contestant who had not selected their question in the previous round made the selection in the tiebreaker round.

On Match Game PM, the third round was added after the first season as games proved to be too short to fill the half-hour. Again, the only celebrities who played were those who did not match that contestant in previous rounds. On Match Game PM, the questions with the most obvious answers were typically used in the third round.

If the contestants had the same score at the end of the game, the scores were reset and the contestants played one tiebreaker question each, again attempting to match all six celebrities. Tiebreaker rounds were repeated until a winner was determined. On Match Game PM, or on the syndicated daytime show if time was running short, a time-saving variant of the tiebreaker that reversed the gameplay was used. The contestants wrote their answers first on cards in secret, then the celebrities were canvassed to give their answers verbally. Originally, this included regulars Somers, Reilly, and Dawson only, but when Dawson left the show, the canvass was expanded to include all six panelists in the usual order. The first celebrity response to match a contestant's answer gave that contestant the victory. If there was still no match, which was rare, the round was replayed with a new question. On the CBS version, the tiebreaker went on until there was a clear winner. If it came to the sudden-death tiebreaker, only the final question (the one that ultimately broke the tie) was kept and aired.

The CBS daytime version had returning champions, and the gameplay "straddled" between episodes, meaning episodes often began and ended with games in progress. In this version, champions stayed until they were defeated or had won $25,000, whichever occurred first. Originally, this amount was the network's winnings limit. Anything above that amount was forfeited, but the rule was later changed so that although champions retired after winning $25,000, they kept any winnings up to $35,000. During the six-year run of Match Game on CBS, only one champion, Carolyn Raisner, retired undefeated with $32,600, the highest total ever won on Match Game.

On the daily 1979–82 syndicated version, two contestants competed against each other in two games, with two new contestants replacing them afterward. The show was timed so that two new contestants appeared each Monday. This was necessary as the tapes of the show were shipped between stations, and weeks could not be aired in any discernible order. This was a common syndication practice at the time, known as "bicycling". Usually, three pairs of contestants competed in a total of six games over the five episodes for each week.

On Friday episodes that ran short, during the first season, a game was played with audience members for a small cash prize, usually $50. The game was played with regular panelist Brett Somers first. A word or phrase with a blank was asked of Somers, and she wrote it down on her card. Rayburn then circulated amongst audience members who raised their hands to play, and if the audience member matched the answer Somers had written down, they won $50. Rayburn continued picking audience members until someone matched the answer. If there was more time left, the same game was played with Charles Nelson Reilly responding to and writing down an answer for another audience member to guess.

Episodes of Match Game PM were self-contained, with two new contestants appearing each week.

=== Super Match ===
The contestant who matched more celebrities than the other contestant at the end of the game won the game and went on to play the Super Match, which consisted of the audience match and the head-to-head match segments, for additional money. On the CBS version, the winner of the main game won $100.

==== Audience Match ====
The contestant was shown a short fill-in-the-blank phrase (example: "Tell it to ______"), for which the members of a previous studio audience had provided responses. The three most popular responses were hidden on the board, and the contestant attempted to match one of them. The contestant chose any three celebrities to offer suggestions, and could either use one of their ideas or give a different one. Matching one of the three responses on the board awarded $500, $250, or $100 in descending order of popularity. If the contestant failed to match any of them, the round ended immediately and the contestant won nothing. The premise for Family Feud (which Dawson began hosting in 1976) was derived from the audience match.

Two audience matches were played on Match Game PM, allowing the contestant to win up to $1,000 in this half of the Super Match. If a contestant failed to win any money in either audience match, Rayburn then read a question similar to those in the main game. The contestant earned $100 per celebrity matched, for a maximum of $600. However, on the first occasion this happened, the contestant ended up with nothing and the remaining time was spent with Dawson reading a funny letter.

==== Head-to-Head Match ====
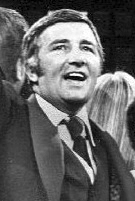
Richard Dawson, a regular panelist from 1973 to 1978, was usually chosen to participate in the head-to-head match.

A contestant who won money in the audience match then had the opportunity to win an additional 10 times that amount (therefore, $5,000, $2,500, or $1,000) by exactly matching another fill-in-the-blank response with one celebrity panelist. Originally, the contestant chose the celebrity. Later, the celebrity who played this match was determined by spinning a wheel (see "Star Wheel" below). At the very start of the 1970s series, Rayburn read the question before the celebrity was chosen, but this was changed after the first two episodes. The format of these matches was much shorter and non-humorous, typically requiring the contestant and celebrity to choose from a number of similar familiar phrases, such as for "Baseball _____" (baseball game, baseball diamond, etc.). The contestant was instructed that their response must be an exact match, although singular/plural matches were usually accepted, whereas synonyms, derivatives, and partial word phrases were not.

The panelist chosen most often by contestants to play the head-to-head match was Richard Dawson, who usually matched with the contestants who chose him. Dawson, in fact, was such a popular choice for the second half of the Super Match that the producers instituted a rule in 1975 that forbade contestants from choosing the same panelist for consecutive head-to-head matches in an effort to give the other celebrities a chance to play. After four weeks, the rule was rescinded.

==== Star Wheel ====
On June 29, 1978, the producers made a second attempt to ensure that each celebrity received a chance to play the head-to-head match. Instead of simply choosing a celebrity, the contestant spun a wheel that was divided into six sections, each marked with a different celebrity's name. Once the wheel stopped, the contestant attempted to match with the indicated celebrity. If the wheel did not make at least one complete revolution, the contestant was required to spin again.

The introduction of the star wheel also brought about a change in the bonus payout structure. Each section included several gold stars, which doubled the stakes if the wheel stopped on one of them. The maximum prize was $10,000 on the daytime series and $20,000 on Match Game PM.

When the star wheel was introduced, each section contained five stars in a continuous white border, and the prize was doubled if the wheel stopped with its pointer anywhere in that area. Beginning with the premiere of the 1979 syndicated version, the wheel was re-designed so that each section had three stars in separate, evenly spaced squares. The pointer now had to be on a square in order to double the money.

Ironically, the wheel stopped on Dawson the first time it was used, inspiring four of the panelists (Somers, Reilly, guest panelist Mary Wickes, and Dawson himself) to stand up from their places and leave the set momentarily out of disbelief, leaving recurring panelist Scoey Mitchell and guest panelist Sharon Farrell behind. As the others returned, Wickes said to host Rayburn, "Do you know what that wheel costs us? And it's right back to Richard!"

At the time, Dawson was becoming weary as a regular panelist on Match Game as he had concurrently been hosting Family Feud, which by then was producing 10 shows a week between its daytime run on ABC and a separate syndicated version. Dawson was tired from appearing on both shows regularly and wished to focus solely on the latter. The addition of the Star Wheel ended what effectively was Dawson's "spotlight" feature on the show, which distressed him further, and he left the panel of Match Game permanently a few weeks later.

The subsequent 1990–91 version of the show used a redesigned version of the star wheel. The wheel itself was stationary, and the contestant spun the pointer on a concentric ring to determine which celebrity he or she had to match. The prize was doubled if the pointer stopped on either of two circles within each section.

=== Staffing and ratings ===
The 1973–82 versions were produced by veteran Goodson–Todman producer Ira Skutch, who also wrote some questions and acted as the on-stage judge. Marc Breslow directed while Robert Sherman was associate producer and head writer.

When CBS revamped Match Game in 1973 with more of a focus on risqué humor, ratings more than doubled in comparison with the NBC incarnation. Within three months, Match Game '73 was the most-watched program on daytime television. By summer 1974, it grew into an absolute phenomenon with high school students and housewives, scoring remarkable ratings among the 12–34 age demographic. The best ratings this version of Match Game saw were in the 1975–76 season when it drew a 12.5 rating with a 35 share, higher numbers than that of some prime-time series. It surpassed records as the most popular daytime program ever with a record 11 million daily viewers, one that held until the "Luke and Laura" supercouple storyline gripped viewers on ABC's General Hospital some years later.

Every New Year's Eve, when the two-digit year designation in the Match Game sign was updated, there was a New Year's party with the cast and studio audience. Up to and including the 1977–78 changeover, a new sign was built each year. Coinciding with a redesign of the set, a new sign was built with interchangeable digits that could be swapped as the years changed. Additionally, this sign allowed for a "PM" logo to be attached for tapings of the syndicated program instead of using an entirely different sign. Charles Nelson Reilly swapped out the "78" portion of the sign and installed the new "79" on-air, to the playing of "Auld Lang Syne" and wished the audience a happy new year.

In 1976, the show's success, and celebrity panelist Richard Dawson's popularity, prompted Goodson–Todman to develop a new show for ABC, titled Family Feud, with Dawson hosting. This show became a major hit in its own right, eventually surpassing the parent program. Family Feud was said to be based on Dawson's expertise in the audience match segment of Match Game.

Meanwhile, Match Game kept its high standing in the ratings despite a short-lived move ahead one half-hour from August to December 1975. In November 1977, however, CBS made a fatal mistake regarding the show's time slot. Taking note of a ratings boon that resulted when The Price Is Right and Match Game were paired in afternoons, a major hole in the schedule had developed in the morning slot that The Price Is Right had left behind. In an attempt to resolve the crisis, CBS moved Match Game to 11:00 a.m., immediately following The Price Is Right at 10:00 a.m. However, because much of Match Game's audience was composed of students who were in school at that time of day, ratings began to sag and eventually free fall; many of these students did not return. As a result, Family Feud quickly supplanted Match Game as television's highest-rated game show.

CBS attempted to correct the problem on December 12, 1977, with a scheduling shuffle among Match, Price, and Tattletales. However, in a move that turned out to do even more damage, the network moved Match Game to its 1960s time slot of 4:00 p.m., a time slot which, by this point, many local stations were preempting in favor of local or syndicated programming. As a result, Match Game was unable to get the audience it once did in the 1960s at 4:00.

=== 1978 changes and cancellation ===
On July 19, 1978, a new Match Game set was built by CBS, changed from the original bright orange to a new set with blue and white colors, as well as revamping the logo. The newly designed Match Game sign meant that a whole new sign no longer had to be built each year as had been done previously. An attachment designating the year was simply taken off the end of the revamped Match Game '78 sign and replaced with a new one numbered '79 on New Year's Eve of 1978, which actually aired January 2, 1979, becoming Match Game '79. (An alternate attachment was used for Match Game PM.)

At 4:00 p.m., the show trailed Family Feud, The Price Is Right, and NBC's Wheel of Fortune, and it fell out of the top three game shows in 1979 for the first time in the CBS run (as opposed to a solid and twice top-3 hit in the 1960s). The 1,439th and final CBS episode aired on April 20, 1979. The Tom Kennedy-hosted game show Whew! replaced Match Game on the schedule when it premiered in the 10:30 a.m. time slot on April 23, 1979, in a scheduling shuffle with The Price Is Right and Love of Life.

=== Match Game PM (1975–81, weekly syndication) ===
On September 8, 1975, the first syndicated version, a weekly nighttime series dubbed Match Game PM premiered. The series, sold to many ABC affiliates (including the network's owned and operated stations such as WABC-TV in New York), was produced by Goodson–Todman and distributed by Jim Victory Television, G-T's syndication partner for Concentration.

Match Game PM was the first version of the game with self-contained episodes. The front game was originally played the same way as the daytime Match Game with two rounds of questions, but in the second season, the third round of questioning was added to fill time in the half-hour. The maximum score a contestant could achieve remained six points, with matched celebrities not playing subsequent questions.

Beginning with the second season, tiebreakers were conducted differently from the daytime version. A "Super Match"-style question was asked, and the contestants wrote their answers, then called on celebrities for a match. Originally, only Somers, Reilly and Dawson played in the tiebreaker, but after Dawson's departure in 1978, all six celebrities played.

Match Game PM's Super Match used two audience matches, with the answer values combined and multiplied by ten for the head-to-head match, with a maximum of $10,000 available. When the star wheel was introduced, that potential payout grew to $20,000 if a contestant spun a double.

Match Game PM ran until the end of the 1980–81 TV season. For its last two seasons, the show's affiliate count went down significantly due in large part to a daily syndicated version that debuted in September 1979, although some markets kept both shows on the air–in New York, WCBS-TV ran the daily syndicated version as WABC-TV continued to air episodes of Match Game PM into its final season. The show aired 230 episodes over six seasons, and remains the longest-running version to air in syndication.

== Later revivals ==
=== 1979–82, daily syndication ===
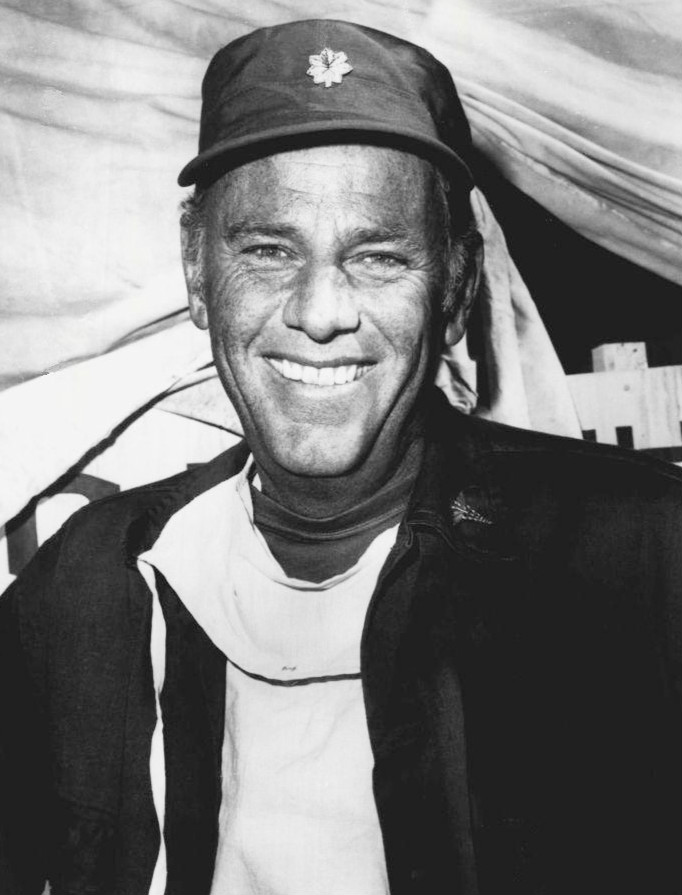
McLean Stevenson became a regular panelist during its final season in syndication.

After the cancellation of Match Game 79, there was still enough interest in the series for Goodson–Todman and Jim Victory Television to consider a continuation of the daily series in syndication as the weekly Match Game PM was still airing and had not stopped production. The consideration eventually came to fruition as a daily syndicated Match Game, without a year attached and often referred to on-air as The Match Game, debuted on September 10, 1979.

The rules and gameplay were the same as before, including the star wheel bonus, but the format was altered slightly. Each contestant on this version of Match Game played a two-game match against another contestant, and the Super Match was played after each game. As is the case with Match Game PM, a contestant did not win any money for winning the game. There were also no returning champions on the daily syndicated series, as two new contestants began each match. The star wheel reduced the golden star sections to three, making it more difficult to double the winnings in the head-to-head match.

The maximum payout for a contestant was $21,000 (two $500 audience matches and two $10,000 head-to-head match wins), the same its syndicated sister series Match Game PM was offering during this time.

For the first two seasons Bill Daily, Dick Martin, Richard Paul, and Bob Barker were among the male semi-regulars who filled Dawson's old spot on the panel. McLean Stevenson, who appeared once in September 1978 and twice near the end of the second year of this version, appeared in nearly all of the third season (1981–82) and became a regular from the eleventh taped week through the end of the season.

The syndicated Match Game helped exacerbate the perception of the 4:00 p.m. time slot being a "death slot" for network programming. After CBS canceled Match Game 79, the network moved the soap opera Love of Life into the vacant time slot. Although the syndicated Match Game was not a direct cause of the ratings problems Love of Life faced—the 4:00 p.m. time slot, the last network daytime slot, had been a problem for all three networks for years, and Love of Life had seen a precipitous drop in ratings since the April 1979 move to the late afternoon—many stations ran the syndicated Match Game against the soap opera, and several more stations, including many CBS-owned stations and affiliates, dropped or delayed Love of Life in favor of the new Match Game. (Love of Life aired its final episode on February 1, 1980, five months after the debut of the new Match Game.) The daytime syndicated show produced 525 episodes, running until September 10, 1982 – exactly three years after its debut.

Match Game's 1973–82 run was taped in Studio 33 at CBS Television City in Los Angeles, except for one week of shows in 1974 in which it was shot in Studio 41.

=== The Match Game-Hollywood Squares Hour (1983–84, NBC) ===
In 1983, producer Mark Goodson teamed up with Orion Television (who had recently acquired the rights to Hollywood Squares) and NBC to create The Match Game-Hollywood Squares Hour. Rayburn, after a year as a morning show host in New York, agreed to return as host. However, few of the regular Squares cast appeared on this version. Jon Bauman (Sha Na Na) was tapped to host the Hollywood Squares segment of the game and he and Rayburn swapped seats while the other hosted his portion of the show. The primary announcer was Gene Wood, with Johnny Olson, Bob Hilton, and Rich Jeffries substituting.

These rules were roughly the same as those of Match Game PM with both contestants given three chances apiece to match each panelist once. The lone noticeable difference was in the tie-breaker. Played similarly to the Super Match, four answers to a statement were secretly shown to the contestants (e.g., "_____, New Jersey", with the choices of "Atlantic City", "Hoboken", "Newark" and "Trenton"). They each chose one by number. Then, as was the case in Match Game PM, the host polled the celebrities for verbal responses, and the first panelist to give an answer selected by one of the contestants won the game for that contestant. The winner of the Match Game segment played the returning champion in the Hollywood Squares segment with the eventual winner of Squares playing the Super Match.

In the Super Match, the audience match featured payoffs of $1,000, $500, and $250. If a contestant did not make an audience match, the game did not end, but the contestant was given $100 and the game continued to the head-to-head match.

For the head-to-head match, the game reverted to the contestant picking the celebrity, and each celebrity had a hidden multiplier (10, 20, 30). The audience match winnings were multiplied by the hidden number to determine the Super Match jackpot for the head-to-head match, with the maximum amount available being $30,000. Champions remained on the program for up to five days unless defeated.

The Match Game-Hollywood Squares Hour ran from October 31, 1983, to July 27, 1984. Several music cues from the program were used as background music during prize descriptions on The Price Is Right.

=== 1990–91, ABC Daytime ===
In 1989, ABC, which had not carried a daytime game show since Bargain Hunters in 1987, ordered a revival of Match Game for its lineup. A week's worth of pilot episodes were commissioned with Bert Convy as host, who was also hosting 3rd Degree for his own production company at the time. The network agreed to pick up the revival for a summer 1990 premiere making it the first Mark Goodson-produced game show to run on the network since Family Feud was cancelled in June 1985.

Just before the new series was to begin, producers were forced to find a new host when Convy was diagnosed with a terminal brain tumor in April 1990. Although original host Gene Rayburn expressed interest in returning, the producers declined, with Rayburn suspecting that public knowledge of his age (72 at the time) led to his being snubbed. Ross Shafer, the former host of Fox's The Late Show and the USA Network dating series Love Me, Love Me Not, took over as host. Charles Nelson Reilly returned as a regular panelist and Brett Somers appeared as a guest panelist for several weeks. Vicki Lawrence, Sally Struthers, Brad Garrett, Bill Kirchenbauer, and Ronn Lucas were among the semi-regulars for this version of the show. Gene Wood returned as an announcer, with Bob Hilton filling in for two weeks. Marcia Wallace, Betty White, Dick Martin, Dolly Martin, Jo Anne Worley, Edie McClurg & Jimmie Walker were among other panelists who also appeared on earlier versions of the show.

==== Gameplay ====
For this edition of Match Game, two contestants competed, with one usually a returning champion. Instead of attempting to match as many of the six panelists as possible over the course of two rounds, the two contestants won money by making matches, with the high scorer becoming champion at the end of the game. Two rounds of fill-in-the-blank questions were played, with each match paying off at $50.

After both contestants played a question of their own, each separately played a speed round of Super Match-style questions called "Match-Up" with a celebrity partner of their choice. The contestant was presented with a question with two possible answers and secretly selected one, after which the panelist was told the choices and then tried to match the contestant's choice by giving a verbal response. Each contestant had 30 seconds to make as many matches as possible as $50 per match. Gameplay began with the trailing contestant, who chose from any of the six panelists. The leading contestant chose from the remaining five panelists for their match-up round.

Following Match-Up, another traditional question round was played with all six celebrities for $50 per match with all six panelists. After round two, contestants then played Final Match-Up (each choosing from the remaining panelists) for 45 seconds, with matches paying off at $100 each. The contestant ahead at the end of Final Match-Up won the game and kept any money earned.

If the game ended in a tie, one tie breaking Match-Up phrase was shown to both contestants along with three choices. The champion chose an answer first and the challenger chose one of the remaining two answers. After the choices were made, the last celebrity who played Final Match-Up was told which answers the contestants selected and was then asked to choose one of them. The contestant whose chosen answer matched the answer said by that celebrity won an additional $100 and the game.

The Super Match was played similar to the 1978–82 version of the round, beginning with the audience match. Initially, the payouts were the same as in the 1970s series, with the top answer worth $500, the second $250, and the third $100, failing to match any of the top three answers awarded $50. After three weeks, the payouts for the second- and third-place answers were increased to $300 and $200, respectively, and the consolation amount was doubled to $100.

Following the audience match, the contestant spun the Star Wheel to choose a celebrity for the head-to-head match and set the stakes. The wheel was fixed in place, and each celebrity's section contained two large red dots. The contestant spun a pointer attached to the rim of the wheel and played for 20 times the audience match value if it stopped on a dot, or 10 times the value otherwise. The contestant had to match the chosen celebrity's response exactly in order to win. The maximum somebody could win in the Super Match was $10,000.

Champions could stay for up to five days or until they were defeated, and kept all their winnings. This version of Match Game was the first not to have a network-imposed winnings limit; ABC had previously set a $20,000 limit on its game shows, but dropped the practice by 1990.

ABC aired the show at 12:00 p.m. because many of its stations in major Eastern Time markets carried local news at that timeslot, which was a major problem among the three networks throughout the 1970s and 1980s; the show was mostly seen in smaller markets and on independent stations in some larger markets without network clearances (which had affected the previous occupier of the time slot, soap opera Ryan's Hope), and was canceled after one season. The show's final episode aired on June 21, 1991; Ross Shafer announced the show would be moving to "another channel, another time, very shortly" on the finale, but this never materialized. On July 15, 1991, Home temporarily expanded to 90 minutes to fill the show's timeslot, until ABC returned the half-hour to its affiliates in September 1992. Match Game was ABC's last daytime game show to date.

=== 1998–99, daily syndication ===
In 1996, a pilot was produced for a new revival of the show as MG2: The Match Game, just five years after the previous incarnation had left the air, with Charlene Tilton as host (who had previously been a panelist herself on the PM version). The pilot (which did not air) had a much greater departure from the game's original format. The producers significantly retooled the format to be more faithful to the original program, and the revival was picked up for syndication in fall 1998.

Michael Burger hosted, with Paul Boland announcing. The only celebrity guests from previous versions of the show were Vicki Lawrence (who appeared for two weeks on the 1970s version and regularly on the 1990–91 version) and Nell Carter (who had appeared on the final week in 1991). The regular panelists on this version were Carter, Lawrence, and Judy Tenuta, and semi-regulars were George Hamilton, John Salley, Coolio, and Rondell Sheridan (the only panelist from MG2 to carry over to the regular series). Production returned to Studio 33 at Television City Studios.

This version was played with rules similar to that of the 1973–82 version. However, the show featured a panel of only five celebrities instead of the usual six. Questions in this version were not labeled A or B; instead, titles with puns gave a clue as to the content. As on the 1990–91 version, all five panelists played each round regardless of whether they matched a contestant on the first question. Correct matches in the first round were worth one point while those in the second were worth two.

After two rounds, the higher scorer played the Super Match, which was played similar to its 1973–78 incarnation, with the exception of the 1983 rule change ($50 in this version for an unsuccessful match). To win the $5,000 top prize in the head to head match, the contestant faced the celebrity (contrary to all previous versions) and the celebrity stood at a lectern to write their answer instead of writing the answer at their seat.

This version aired in late night due to more risqué content, including frank description of genitalia that would have been inappropriate for other scheduling blocks. Some of the content was not censored. It only lasted one season, running from September 21, 1998, to May 21, 1999, with repeats airing until September 17, 1999.

=== Gameshow Marathon (2006, CBS) ===
On June 22, 2006, Match Game was the sixth of seven classic game shows featured in CBS's month-long Gameshow Marathon hosted by Ricki Lake and announced by Rich Fields, and the second of two "semi-final" games in the tournament. The contestants were Kathy Najimy and Lance Bass with Betty White, George Foreman, Kathy Griffin, Bruce Vilanch, Adam Carolla, and Adrianne Curry as the panel. White retained her normal sixth-seat position and was the only one from the original series to appear for this segment of Gameshow Marathon.

Lake used the same signature long-thin Sony ECM-51 telescoping microphone Rayburn used during the CBS version, and the set was rebuilt to be almost an exact match of that used from 1973 to 1978. Najimy won the game, scoring five matches to Bass's three.

The format was that of Match Game PM, except that in the Super Match the head-to-head match was played for 50 times the amount won in the two audience matches ($50,000), which was won.

=== Match Game (Canada) ===
A Canadian revival of Match Game debuted on March 5, 2010, as Atomes crochus, a Québécois version on V, with Alexandre Barrette as host and produced by Zone 3, in association with FremantleMedia North America. A coinciding English-language version debuted on The Comedy Network October 15, 2012 and was hosted by Darrin Rose, with Seán Cullen and Debra DiGiovanni as permanent panelists. On April 4, 2013, it was announced that due to high ratings, the show returned for a 60-episode second season, which premiered on September 2.

The first English-language season shared studios with the French-language version in Montreal, with production of the English version moving to Showline Studios in Toronto for season 2.

Gameplay is similar to the 1990 U.S. revival, two rounds are played, with all six celebrities participating in both rounds, and each match is worth 50 points (100 points starting in season 2). The third round is called match-up!, with each contestant given 45 seconds to match her or his chosen celebrity partner, and successful matches are again worth 50 points (100 starting in season 2). The contestant with more points at the end of this round wins the game and receives the cash equivalent of their score (for example, if the champion's final score was 450 points, the payoff would be $450). If there is a tie after Match-Up, one tiebreaking Match-up is shown with three choices. Both contestants secretly chose their picks and the celebrity that last played Match-Up gets to break the tie with his/her verbal response.

Unlike any previous version, the audience match portion of the Super Match is not played for a payoff, but simply to determine the value of the head-to-head match. The potential payoffs are $2,500–$2,000–$1,500, or $1,000 for an unsuccessful match. If the champion manages a lucky star wheel spin, as in earlier versions, the value is doubled for a payoff of up to $5,000. Originally, in season 1 the payoffs were $2,000–$1,500–$1,000, or $500 for an unsuccessful match, with a potential top payoff of $4,000 for a lucky star wheel spin.

=== First ABC revival (2016–21) ===
The first of ten 60-minute episodes of another revival of Match Game premiered on ABC (which had previously aired the 1990 version) on June 26, 2016. Alec Baldwin served as host and executive producer. The show aired as part of ABC's "Sunday Fun and Games" block alongside the returning Celebrity Family Feud and The $100,000 Pyramid. It also marked the series' return to New York, having taped there during the 1960s. On August 4, 2016, ABC renewed Match Game for a second season.

Gameplay was similar to the 1973–79 version, featuring two full games, each with two new contestants. Each game is self-contained, with two questions per contestant, the winner advances to the Super Match. If the score was tied after two rounds, a tiebreaker round with all stars was played, if the tie persisted, a sudden-death tiebreaker was played. Values for the audience match portion of the bonus game were $5,000, $3,000, and $2,000, with $1,000 awarded for not matching any of the top three answers. The contestant then selected a celebrity for the head-to-head match, which multiplied the audience match winnings by five if successful, for a potential top prize of $25,000.

On many episodes, answers deemed inappropriate for broadcast were edited out with comical effects, including a slide whistle sound effect dubbed over the audible answer in place of the usual bleep censor. In addition, the answer card and celebrity's mouth could be blurred or pixelated.

The show was picked up to fill ABC's winter programming schedule on January 4, 2017.

On April 2, 2017, the show began to be used as a mid-season replacement on Sunday evenings with newly produced episodes filling in for three weeks to replace the canceled period drama/sci-fi series Time After Time before the start of May sweeps, when extended season finales and awards ceremonies fill out the remainder of the season.

On August 6, 2017, ABC announced that Match Game was renewed for a third season, which later premiered on January 9, 2018. Season four of the show debuted in June 2019. On November 20, 2019, the series was renewed for a fifth season, which premiered on May 31, 2020. After the last series of episodes aired over summer 2020 and July 2021, ABC confirmed in April 2022 that the series had been cancelled; the decision was made before Baldwin was involved in an accidental shooting of a crew member on the set of the film Rust in October 2021.

=== Second ABC revival (2025) ===
On April 29, 2025, ABC announced that it would premiere a second prime time revival of Match Game, hosted by Canadian comedian and actor Martin Short, and filmed in Montreal, Quebec. Short also serves as an executive producer. The revival premiered on July 23, 2025.

== Episode status ==
Only 11 episodes of the 1962–69 series are known to survive—the pilot and 10 kinescope recordings, all of which are archived at the Paley Center for Media. Nine of these are black-and-white kinescopes and one is a color episode (from 1969 and on videotape). The pilot has since fallen into the public domain.

=== Reruns ===
The 1973–82 incarnations are shown in reruns daily on Buzzr and GSN.

Virtually all episodes of this version are still extant, although some are reportedly not shown due to celebrities' refusals of clearances, while others have been banned for various reasons (usually for answers from either celebrities or contestants that are now deemed to no longer be politically correct) or pulled from reruns due to tape damage. The 1990–91 ABC version has also had runs on GSN until 2005. On December 25, 2012, an episode of the 1998 version along with a Bert Convy pilot aired on GSN for the first time as part of a Match Game marathon.

Buzzr also airs reruns of the 1970s Match Game incarnation. Buzzr added the Match Game-Hollywood Squares Hour episodes to its lineup in February 2019, initially with the first week of episodes; more episodes were eventually added in September after the network updated the show's archive for 21st-century broadcasting standards. Those episodes had not been seen on television since their original broadcasts.

== The Real Match Game Story: Behind the Blank ==
On November 26, 2006, GSN aired an hour-long documentary titled The Real Match Game Story: Behind The Blank, narrated by Jamie Farr. The documentary features rarely seen footage of the 1960s version, many odd or memorable moments from the main 1973–82 runs, and interviews with Rayburn (including the final interview before his death in 1999), Somers, Dawson, DeBartolo, producer Ira Skutch, and others involved in the show's production.

== Music ==
Match Game featured several theme songs throughout its various runs. From 1962 to 1967, Bert Kaempfert's instrumental "A Swingin' Safari" was used as the theme. Kaempfert's commercial single, recorded in Europe, was used for the pilot, an American cover version by the Billy Vaughn orchestra was used through 1967. From 1967 to 1969, a new theme composed by Score Productions was used.

When the program returned in 1973, Goodson–Todman once again turned to Score Productions for a music package. A new theme, performed by The Midnight Four, was composed by Score staff composer Ken Bichel with a memorable "funk" guitar intro, and similar elements and instruments from this theme were also featured in the numerous "think cues" heard when the panel wrote down their answers. Alternate think cues were extracted from the music packages for Tattletales and The Money Maze. In keeping with the zany atmosphere, the music supervisors also used other notable musical works to add to humorous situations. Among the non-Score Productions music heard on occasion was the "burlesque" music titled "The Stripper", and a version of "Stars and Stripes Forever" (usually humorously played in response to Rayburn's call for "belly dancing" music).

The music for The Match Game–Hollywood Squares Hour was composed by Edd Kalehoff. None of the music used from the 1970s version was used in this version. The main theme song and several of its cue variations were used on The Price Is Right.

In 1990, Bichel re-orchestrated his 1970s theme with more modern instruments with new think cues (with the classic intro/think cue re-orchestrated). The 1998 version again used music from Score Productions. The 2016 revival utilizes Bichel's original 1973 theme and think cues.

== International versions ==
Country	Local name	Host	Channel	Year aired
Argentina	Match Game	Agustín Aristarán	El Trece	2021–22
Australia	Match Game	Michael McCarthy	Network Ten	1960s
Australia	Graham Kennedy's Blankety Blanks	Graham Kennedy	Network Ten	1977–78
Australia	Blankety Blanks	Daryl Somers; Shane Bourne	Nine Network	1985–86; 1996–97
Canada	Match Game	Darrin Rose	The Comedy Network	2012–13
Canada	L'union fait la farce	Serge Bélair; Raymond Lemay	TVA	1976–78
Canada	Atomes Crochus	Alexandre Barrette	V	2010–16
France	Les Bons Génies	Patrice Laffont	France 2	1996
Germany	Schnickschnack	Klaus Wildbolz	ARD	1975–77
Germany	Punkt, Punkt, Punkt	Mike Krüger	ARD (1991); Sat.1 (1992–94)	1991–94
Indonesia	Match Game Indonesia	Arie Untung	GTV	2018
Japan	アイ・アイゲーム; Ai Aigēmu	Shingo Yamashiro	Fuji TV	1979–85
Mexico	Espacio en Blanco	Mauricio Barcelata	Televisa	2006
United Kingdom	Blankety Blank	Terry Wogan; Les Dawson; Lily Savage	BBC1	1979–83; 1984–90; 1997–99
United Kingdom	Lily Savage's Blankety Blank	Lily Savage	ITV	2001–02
United Kingdom	Blankety Blank	David Walliams	ITV	2016
United Kingdom	Blankety Blank	Bradley Walsh	BBC1	2020 (Christmas Special); 2021–26
Vietnam	Siêu sao Đoán Chữ	Đại Nghĩa	HTV7	April 3, 2017 – June 19, 2017

== Merchandise ==
=== Home games ===
Several home game versions based on the 1960s and 1970s American television version were published by Milton Bradley from 1963 through 1978, in multiple editions.

==== The Match Game (1963–69) ====
Starting in 1963, Milton Bradley made six editions of the NBC version. Each game contained crayons, wipe-off papers, 100 perforated cards with six questions per card, a plastic scoreboard tray with colored pegs and chips, and 6 "scribble boards". After the first edition, the vinyl scribble boards and crayons were replaced with six "magic slates" and wooden styli.

The main object of the game is for a contestant to try to write answers to questions that will match the answers of their partner. The rules for a six-contestant game are the same as on the TV show (with similar scoring, such as receiving points for matching two answers and more points for matching all three answers), but the home game also has variations for fewer than six contestants. No bonus game is included.

Milton Bradley also created a Fine Edition and a Collector's Edition with more questions. The magic slates came enclosed in a gold folder, plus a dial to keep score instead of the pegboard. The scoring and point values were just like the TV show. The only difference between the Fine Edition and the Collector's Edition is that instead of being packaged in a normal cardboard box, it came in a leatherette case with buttons on the front apron.

==== Match Game (1974–78) ====
Starting in 1974, Milton Bradley created three more editions based on the most famous CBS version. Each edition contained a game board with a plastic stand, two game booklets (one with instructions) with material for 92 complete games (368 Main Game Questions and 92 audience match and head-to-head match questions), two magic slates and styli (only of the head-to-head match portion), and play money.

As in the 1970s version, two contestants have two chances to match as many of the six celebrities as possible. Celebrity answers are printed in the booklets, and after the contestant gives an answer, the M.C. reads the celebrity responses one by one, marking correct answers on the game board. A contestant can get up to six matches in one game. The contestant with the most matches plays the Super Match round (the MC reads the question and the responses) for a chance to win money (with an audience match and a head-to-head match similar to the TV show) of up to $5,000.

=== Interactive online versions ===
After much success with its online version of Family Feud, Uproar.com released a single-contestant version of Match Game in 2001. However, as of September 30, 2006, the website has been temporarily shut down, no longer offering any game show-based games of any kind.

GSN offered a version called Match Game: Interactive on its own website that allowed users to play along with the show while watching. However, as of January 1, 2007, only those shows airing between 7:00 pm and 10:00 pm were interactive as Match Game itself was not one of them.

=== Slot machine ===
A five reels video slot machine based on the 1973–82 version was released at various US casinos by WMS Gaming in 2004. The game features caricatures of Jimmie Walker, Brett Somers, Charles Nelson Reilly, Morgan Fairchild (even though she has never appeared on any incarnations of the show itself), Rip Taylor and Vicki Lawrence as the panel and Gene Rayburn as the host. The slot machine's bonus round stays faithful to the original game format where round one is adapted from the main game while round two features the Super Match bonus round.

=== Home media ===
A DVD set called The Best of Match Game featuring a collection of more than 30 episodes of the 1970s version including the original 1962 pilot episode (which was originally called The Match Game) was released in 2006. An eight-episode collection, called "The Best of Match Game: Dumb Dora Is So Dumb Edition!", was released later on in 2007 by BCI Eclipse Company LLC (under license from FremantleMedia Enterprises), which contained 8 original episodes, uncut and unedited, and digitally restored, re-mastered and transferred from the original 2-inch videotape recording masters for optimum video quality.

In 2007, Endless Games released a DVD game featuring questions and clips from the 1970s version. Its gameplay was similar to that of the 1970s version; however, it allowed up to six contestants rather than two. Scoring for the game was also slightly different as well, as every match in round one was worth $50 each while in round two, every match was worth $100. Also, the Super Match round was played differently. The audience match portion was played after round one by the leading contestants, and the head-to-head match by the winning contestants, with a correct match doubling the winnings of the contestant's scores.

== In popular culture ==
The success of Match Game led to its portrayal in other media. In the Howard Stern biopic Private Parts, the radio host and his crew play a version of the game with more inappropriate answers (Longtime sidekick Robin Quivers, parodying Somers, responded to the question "[Blank] Willow" with an answer about female genitalia).

Saturday Night Live, the current occupant of Match Game's former New York studio, featured a parody in a Season 33 episode under the title "It's a Match", with fictitious names given to panelists (Amy Poehler and Fred Armisen played characters similar to Somers and Reilly).

Since 2010, Match Game has been parodied by drag artist RuPaul in the cable reality competition series RuPaul's Drag Race as "Snatch Game": a regular challenge in the series where the contestants each impersonate a different celebrity for comedic effect.
