= Holyoke Community College =

Public college in Holyoke, Massachusetts, US

Coordinates: 42°11′40.35″N 72°39′0.87″W

- Former names: Holyoke Graduate School (1946–1947); Holyoke Junior College (1947–1964)
- Motto: Efficiunt Clarum Studio (Latin) "They make it clear by study"
- Type: Public community college
- Established: September 9, 1946; July 1, 1964 (Note: City transferred ownership; formally joined the Massachusetts Community College System.)
- Accreditation: NECHE
- Affiliations: Cooperating Colleges of Greater Springfield
- Endowment: $13.4 million
- President: George Timmons
- Academic staff: 128 full-time faculty 332 adjunct
- Students: 3,550 (fall 2022)
- Location: Holyoke, Massachusetts, United States
- Campus: Suburban
- Colors: Green & Black
- Nickname: HCC
- Mascot: Cougars
- Website: www.hcc.edu

Holyoke Community College (HCC) is a public community college in Holyoke, Massachusetts. It offers associate degrees and certificate programs, as well as a transfer program for students to earn credits for transfer to other colleges. It was the first community college established in Massachusetts, as it was founded by the city's school board in 1946, while others were subsequently chartered under state jurisdiction after 1960.

HCC is located on a 135-acre (0.55 km^{2}) campus and has satellite locations throughout the Pioneer Valley, including the HCC-MGM Culinary Arts Institute, the only culinary arts program at a Massachusetts college accredited by the American Culinary Federation.

The college participates in the Commonwealth Dual Enrollment Partnership (CDEP) and allows high school applicants to opt for full or part-time coursework to receive both high school and transferable college credit. Enrolled students may also complete certain coursework at Mount Holyoke and Smith College, as both share faculty with the community college. Holyoke Community College is accredited by the New England Commission of Higher Education.

== History ==
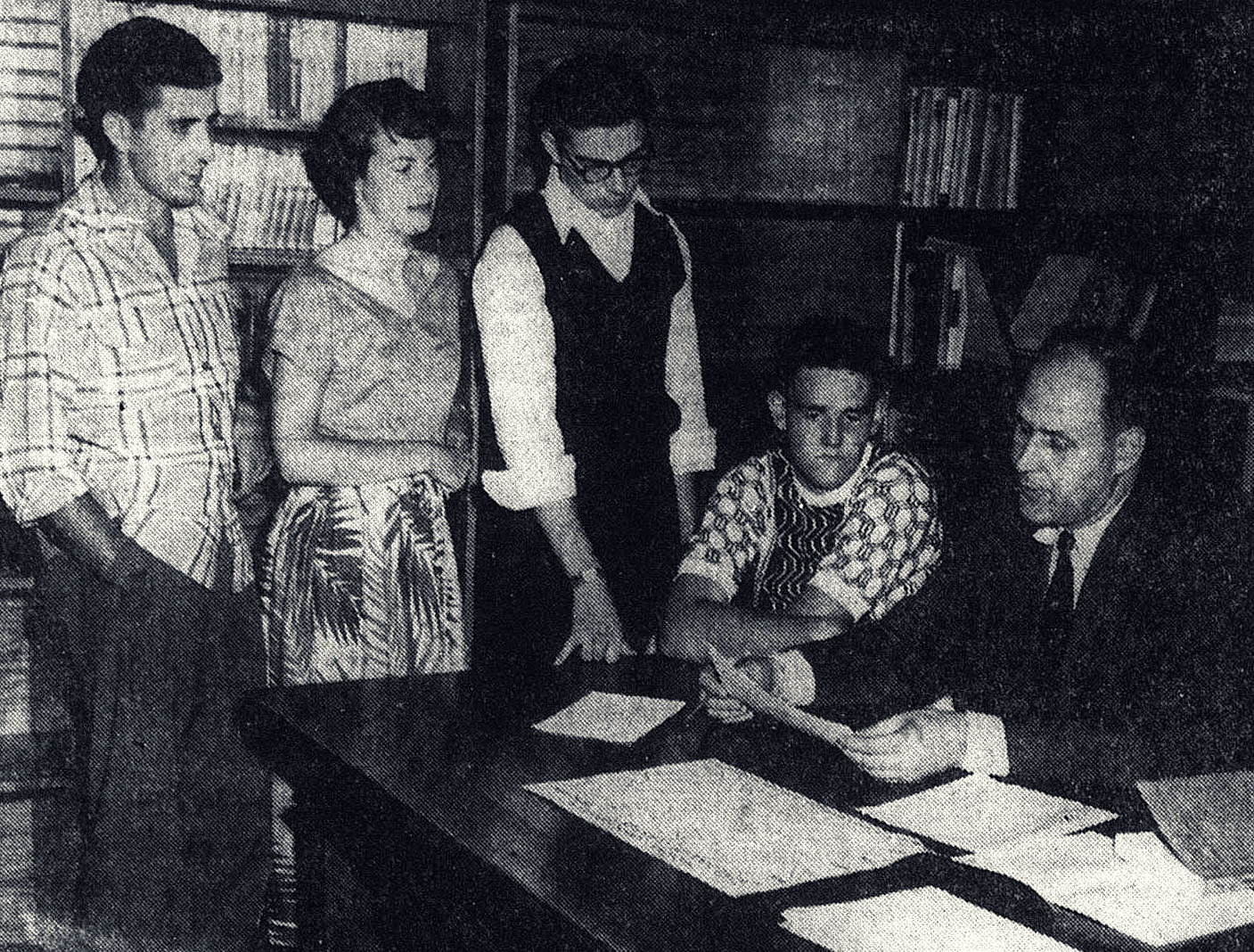
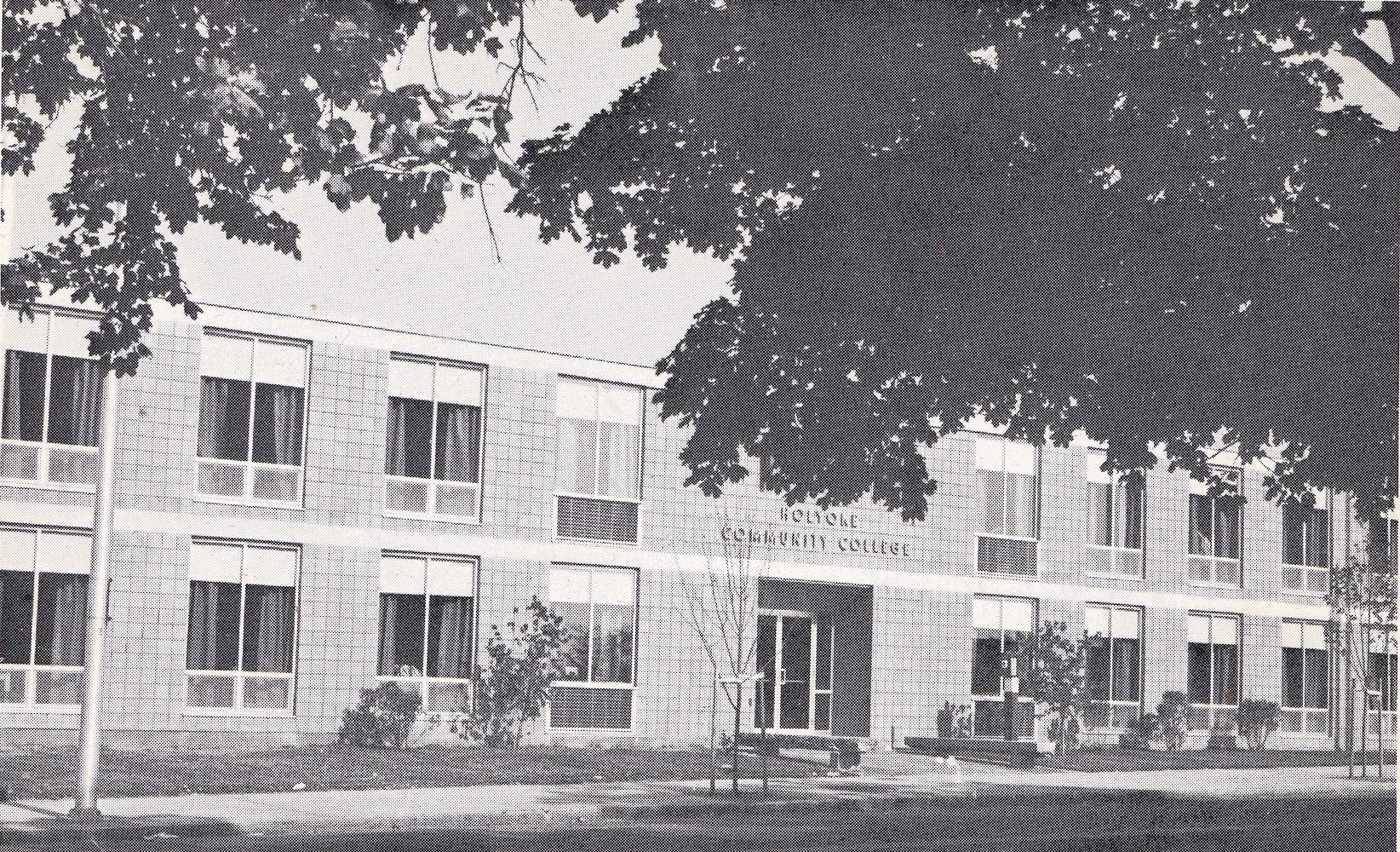
HCC's first director, George E. Frost, discusses enrollment with high school seniors, 1950; the community college's temporary classrooms at Beech/Sargent St, used from 1969 to 1974 following the Alderman building fire

Holyoke Community College's history is unique in that it was not only the first established community college in the state, but was initially managed municipally by the local school board. With funding provided by the GI Bill following World War II, the opportunity was granted to states to provide supplementary education in addition to coursework given through high school. In order to expedite the establishment of this coursework, the Massachusetts General Court passed an emergency act on June 13, 1946, to allow school committees to vote for post-graduate instruction. Following a period of evaluation, the Holyoke School Board voted in favor of establishing the Holyoke Graduate School on September 9, 1946, having admitted 67 students for its founding class. On April 1, 1947, this name was changed to the Holyoke Junior College after a state act was passed allowing municipalities to operate higher educational institutions under this title.

On July 1, 1964, with approval from the state department of education, the school board relinquished control and the college was given its current name, Holyoke Community College. On January 4, 1968, the Holyoke Community College building burned to the ground. Classes continued in various locations across Holyoke. A temporary campus was opened in June 1971 and the current campus opened on February 19, 1974.

In its nearly 75 year history the college has had only four presidents, as of 2026, with founding director Dr. George E. Frost serving until 1975, at which time alumnus and former Speaker of the Massachusetts House Dr. David M. Bartley succeeded him. With Bartley's retirement in 2004, William F. Messner became the third, and with his 2016 retirement the current president, Dr. Christina Royal, became the fourth and the first woman to serve the office.

In October 2019, the college announced it would launch the state's first Cannabis Education Center in partnership with the Cannabis Community Care and Research Network (C3RN). The program provides certificate training for patient advocates, budtenders, extraction and laboratory roles, as well as offerings within its culinary program.

=== Foundation ===
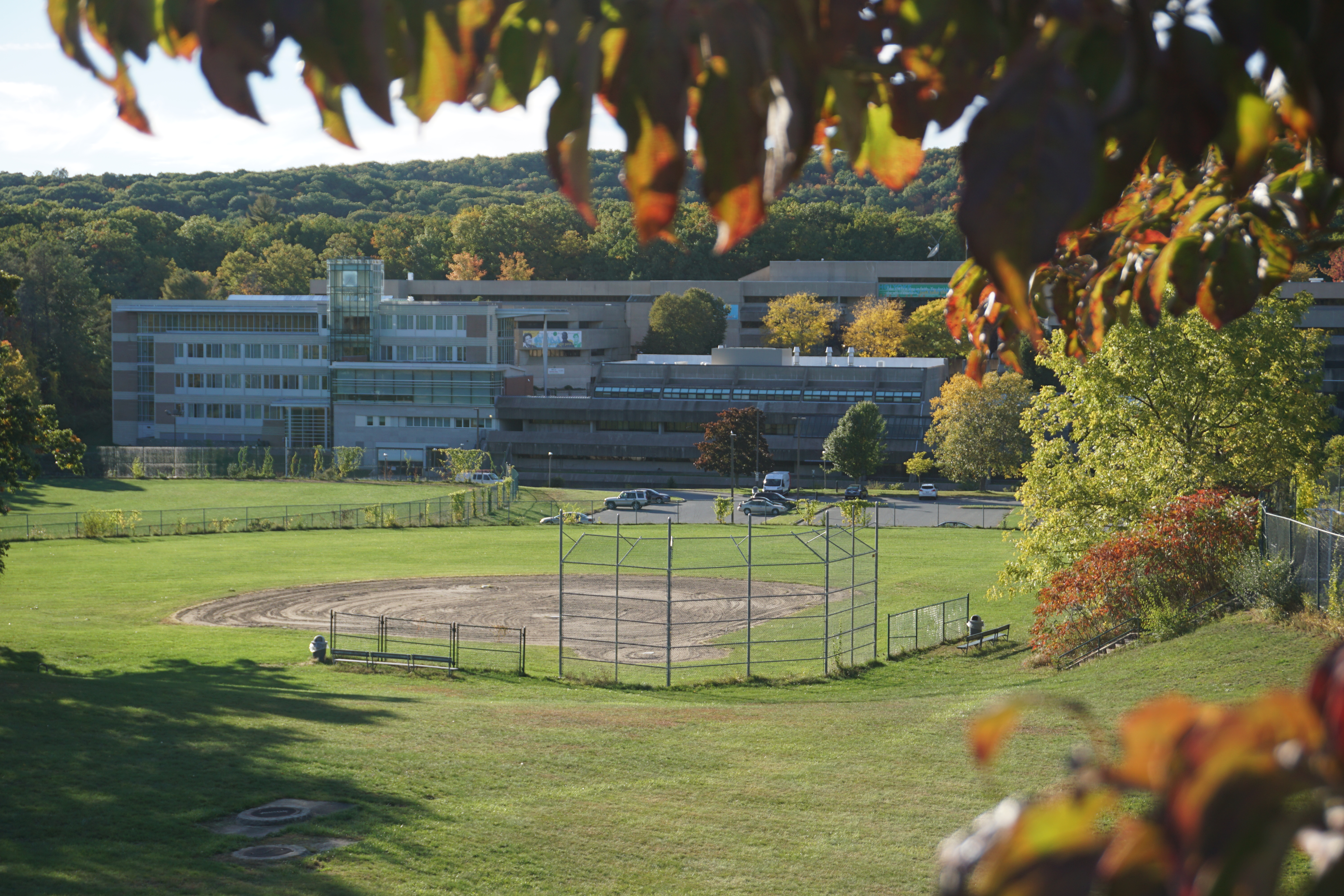
HCC's main campus, sitting at the edge of the municipal watershed for the Holyoke Water Works, the area to the west of campus is entirely forested

Following a devastating fire that destroyed the then-refurbished college building (the former Alderman Holyoke High School), the yellow bricks from the former facility were sold off to raise funds for an independent charitable corporation, created by Mayor William S. Taupier. This charity, known as the Friends of Holyoke Community College, was initially founded for the purpose of conducting fundraising to construct new facilities. The idea of rebuilding such a school in Holyoke was left in doubt by the state but after hundreds of letters and phone calls from residents to Governor Volpe, funding was granted for an entirely new campus in the Homestead Avenue neighborhood. The Friends of Holyoke Community College would be renamed the Holyoke Community College Foundation in 1985, a separate 501(c)(3) nonprofit organization which fundraises to supplement state appropriations to the college through benefactor scholarships, educational grants, and the annually-awarded Elaine Marieb Faculty Chair for Teaching Excellence. As of 2018, the foundation presided over the largest endowment of any community college foundation in the Commonwealth.

== Campus ==
Buildings on Campus
Abbr.	Building	Year	Uses
BC	David M. Bartley Center for Athletics & Recreation	2000	Athletics
CC	Campus Center	1981	Admissions, Advising, College Store, Dining Services, Student Engagement
DON	Donahue	1974	Computer Lab, Library
FPA	Fine & Performing Arts	1975	Leslie Philips Theater, Mac Lab
FR	Frost	1974	Administration, Financial Aid, IT Helpdesk, Student Accounts, Student Records
KC	Kittredge Center for Business & Workforce Development	2006	
MRB	Marieb	1974	Health and Life Sciences

== Locations ==
In addition to the main campus on in the Homestead Avenue area of Holyoke, the community college also maintains a number of satellite campuses, generally associated with specific programs, including:

- Center for Health Education, 404 Jarvis Avenue, Holyoke
- Education to Employment Center, 79 Main Street, Ware
- HCC-MGM Culinary Arts Center, 164 Race Street, Holyoke
- Ludlow Area Adult Learning Center, 54 Winsor Street, Ludlow
- Picknelly Adult & Family Education Center, Holyoke Transportation Center, 206 Maple Street, Holyoke

== Notable alumni ==
- Craig Blais, American poet and scholar, assistant professor of English at Anna Maria College, recipient of the Felix Pollak Prize in Poetry, with published works in The Antioch Review and Yale Review.
- Paul Boland, impressionist and singer
- Augusten Burroughs, writer (dropped out)
- Richard H. Demers, former mayor of Chicopee, Massachusetts, and former member of House of Representatives, real estate developer.
- Sabina Gadecki, actress and fashion model
- Fran Healy, professional baseball player and sportscaster
- Michael F. Kane, politician
- Michael J. Kittredge II, founder of the Yankee Candle Company.
- Luis Daniel Muñiz, Puerto Rican politician and senator for the Mayagüez-Aguadilla district.
- Henry P. Monaghan, constitutional law scholar, professor at Columbia Law School
- Richard Neal, former city councilor and mayor of Springfield, Massachusetts, member of the US House of Representatives representing the 1st district of Massachusetts.
- Patty O'Donnell, former member of the Vermont House of Representatives, and member of the school board of Vernon, Vermont.
- Joe Peters, artist whose work has been featured in the Corning Museum of Glass.
- Todd Smola, member of the Massachusetts House of Representatives representing the 1st Hampden district.
- Taino, rapper
- Aaron Vega, member of the Massachusetts House of Representatives representing the 5th Hampden district, serving on the Joint Committee on Higher Education, former documentary film editor with previous work with Ken Burns

== See also ==
- WCCH (103.5 FM), the community college's FM radio station
