= University of Massachusetts Amherst College of Nursing =

Nursing college at University of Massachusetts Amherst

Coordinates: 42°23′29.5″N 72°31′29.2″W

Elaine N. Marieb College of Nursing
- Public nursing college
- University of Massachusetts Amherst
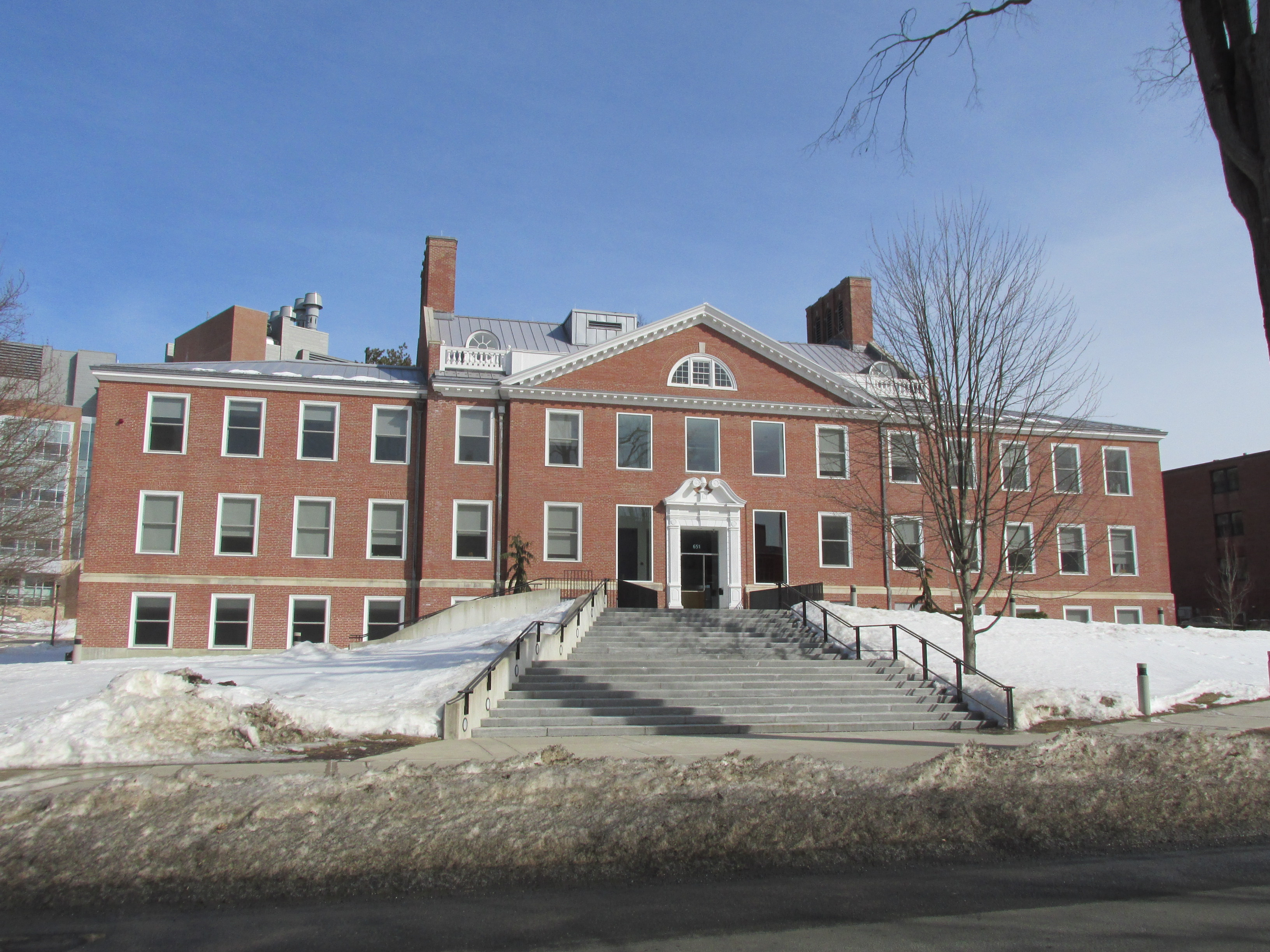
- Skinner Hall

- Logo
- Location: 651 N Pleasant St, Amherst, Massachusetts
- Named for: Elaine N. Marieb Foundation
- Colors
- Gender: Co-educational
- Dean: Allison Vorderstrasse
- Website: http://www.umass.edu/nursing/

The University of Massachusetts Amherst Elaine N. Marieb College of Nursing is a nursing college at the University of Massachusetts Amherst.

== History ==
Founded in 1953, the college offered the first baccalaureate nursing program in public higher education in Massachusetts. It launched its first Master of Science degree program four years later and, in 1994, established its PhD program, the commonwealth’s first publicly supported PhD program in nursing, in collaboration with the Graduate School of Nursing at the University of Massachusetts Medical School.

In 2012, the College opened its first Office of Nursing Research.

In 2021, the Elaine Nicpon Marieb Charitable Foundation donated $21.5 million to the UMass Amherst, the university's largest to date. As a result, the college was named after her and officially dedicated in September 2022.

Elaine Nicpon Marieb was a two-time alumna of the University of Massachusetts Amherst and an educator. UMass Amherst said the gift would support the college’s nursing-engineering center, student scholarships, an endowed professorship, mentorship and research initiatives, graduate fellowships, pilot-project seed funding, an annual symposium, and expansion of nursing simulation laboratories.

In 2024, UMass partnered with the Massachusetts Department of Public Health (MDPH), to launch a new initiative supporting local public health nurses statewide. The initiative was funded by an initial $3.5 million from the state of Massachusetts.

In 2025, the university received a $3 million grant from the National Science Foundation to support engineering and nursing technology collaboration.

The College of Nursing is also a Climate Champion school, part of the Alliance of Nurses for Healthy Environments (ANHE).

== Degree programs ==
The college offers undergraduate programs including a traditional and accelerated Bachelor of Science in Nursing programs. The accelerated program is designed for students who already hold a bachelor’s degree.

Graduate programs include an online Doctor of Nursing Practice, a PhD in nursing, a Baystate Midwifery Education Program with an optional concurrent master’s degree, and an online Master of Science in Nursing with concentrations in Nursing Education and Public Health Nursing. The college also offers graduate certificates in nursing education, psychiatric mental health nurse practitioner preparation, and population health for health professionals.

== Accreditation ==
The baccalaureate,master’s and Doctor of Nursing Practiceprograms are accredited by the Commission on Collegiate Nursing Education. The baccalaureate degree program is also fully approved by the Massachusetts Board of Registration in Nursing.

== Research ==
The college’s research project areas include health care quality, health-equity interventions, technology-enabled care, nutrition, health behavior, aging, and nursing education. Its faculty also work through interdisciplinary collaboration across nursing, engineering, public health, epidemiology, computer science, and other fields.
