= Massachusetts House of Representatives' 5th Hampden district =

American legislative district

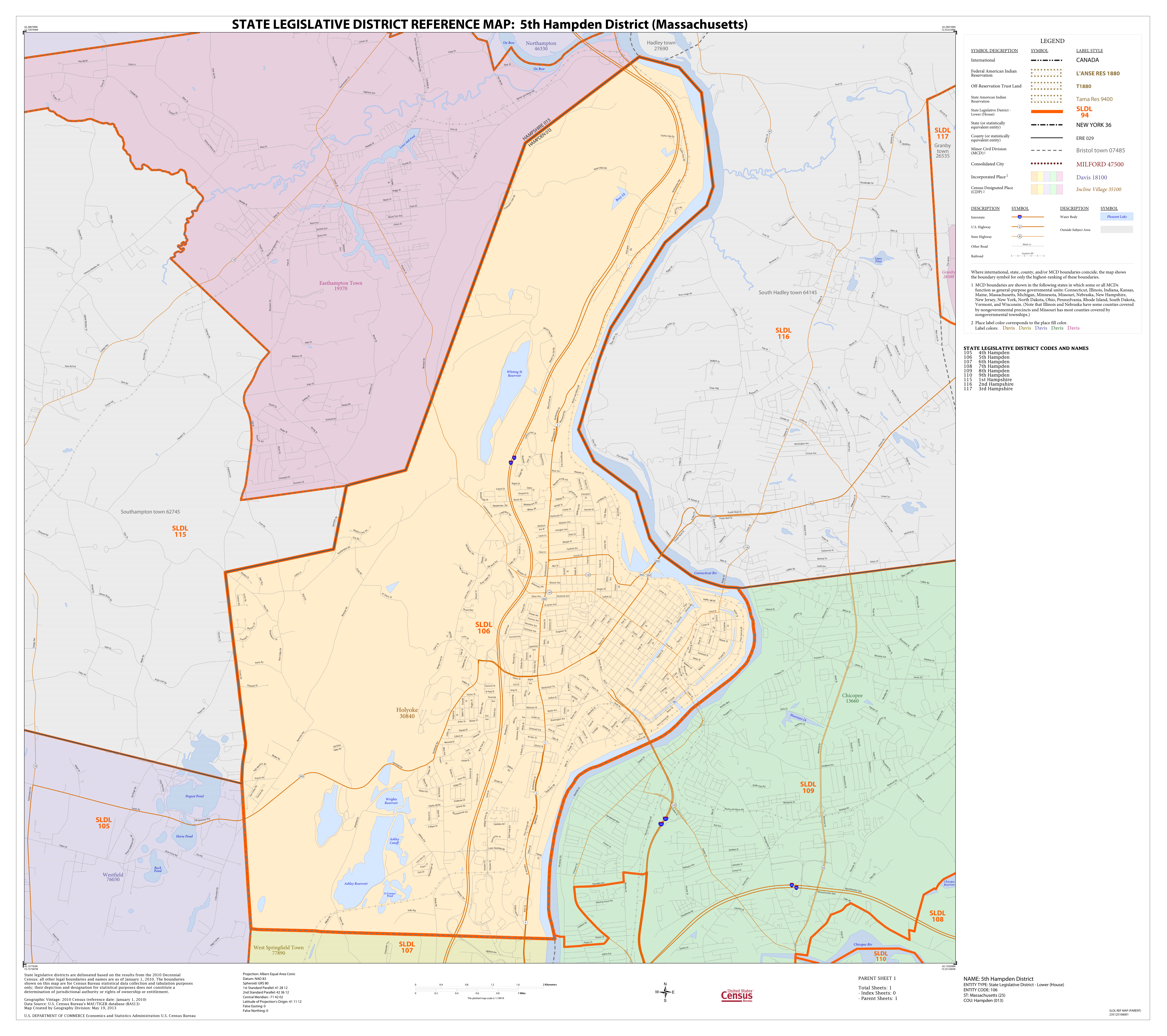
Map of Massachusetts House of Representatives' 5th Hampden district, based on the 2010 United States census.

Massachusetts House of Representatives' 5th Hampden district in the United States is one of 160 legislative districts included in the lower house of the Massachusetts General Court. It covers the city of Holyoke in Hampden County. Democrat Aaron Vega of Holyoke has represented the district since 2013. Candidates for this district seat in the 2020 Massachusetts general election include Patrick Beaudry and Patricia Duffy.

The current district geographic boundary overlaps with that of the Massachusetts Senate's 2nd Hampden and Hampshire district.

== Representatives ==
- Henry Vose, circa 1858
- Philo F. Wilcox, circa 1859
- George W. Gibson, circa 1888
- Joseph E. King, circa 1920
- John G. Curley, circa 1951
- John Pierce Lynch, circa 1951
- Peter A. Velis, circa 1975
- Robert Rohan
- Evelyn Chesky
- Michael F. Kane
- Aaron Vega, 2013
- Patricia A. Duffy

== Former locale ==
The district previously covered part of Springfield, circa 1872.

== See also ==
- List of Massachusetts House of Representatives elections
- Other Hampden County districts of the Massachusetts House of Representatives: 1st, 2nd, 3rd, 4th, 6th, 7th, 8th, 9th, 10th, 11th, 12th
- Hampden County districts of the Massachusett Senate: Berkshire, Hampshire, Franklin, and Hampden; Hampden; 1st Hampden and Hampshire; 2nd Hampden and Hampshire
- List of Massachusetts General Courts
- List of former districts of the Massachusetts House of Representatives

== Images ==
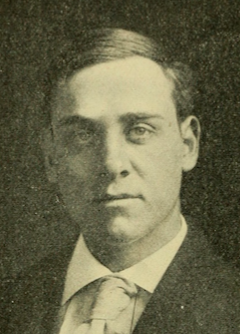
Daniel Morgan

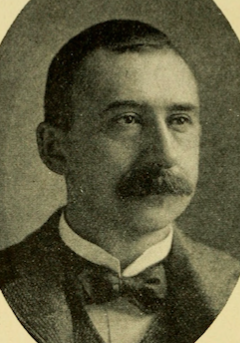
Frank Kemp

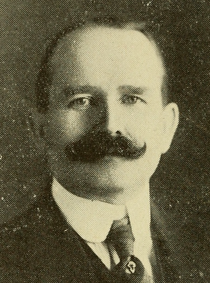
William Foster

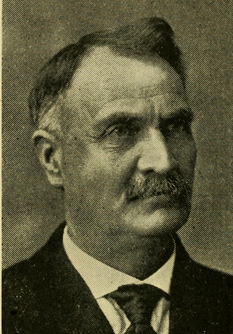
Arthur Littlefield

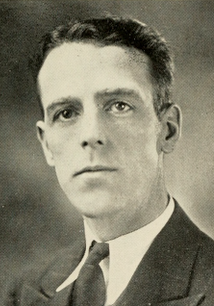
Philip Markley

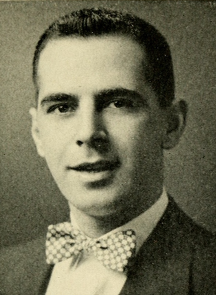
Thomas O'Connor

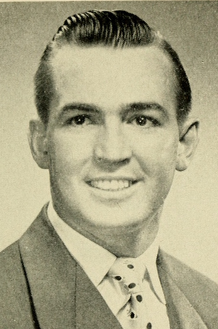
William Christopher Sullivan

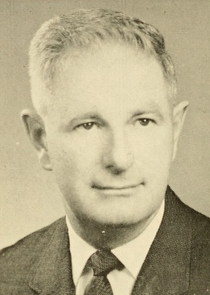
James Bowler

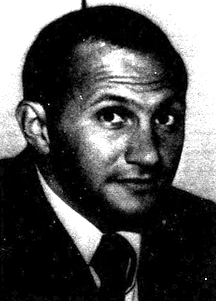
Peter Velis

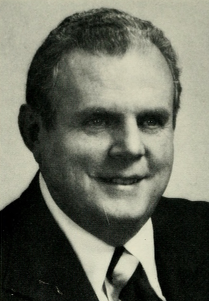
Robert Rohan

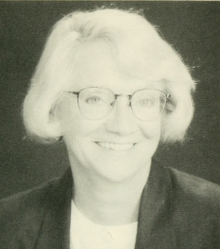
Evelyn Chesky

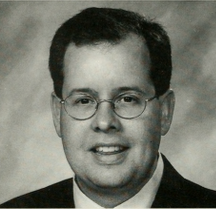
Michael Kane
