= American librarianship and human rights =

Librarianship and human rights in the U.S. are linked by the philosophy and practice of library and information professionals supporting the rights enumerated in the Universal Declaration of Human Rights (UDHR), particularly the established rights to information, knowledge and free expression.

The American Library Association (ALA), the national voice of the profession in the United States, has developed statements, policies and initiatives supporting human rights by affirming intellectual freedom, privacy and confidentiality, and the rights of all people to access library services and resources on an equitable basis. The daily work of librarians contributes to the personal growth, enrichment, and capabilities of individuals, which is considered to be an integral approach to advancing human rights.

Librarians, both individually and collectively, have a long history of engagement with human rights issues as they pertain to libraries and the communities they serve: against censorship and discrimination; and in support of the rights of immigrants, cultural minorities, poor people, the homeless and unemployed, people with disabilities, children and young adults, the LGBT community, older adults, those who are illiterate, and the imprisoned. Librarians also protect human rights by developing diverse collections, programs and services, and preserving cultural and historical records.

== The Universal Declaration of Human Rights and librarianship ==
The Universal Declaration of Human Rights (UDHR) is viewed as a set of ideals to guide librarianship. Librarianship is most closely associated with Article 19, which concerns the human right to freedom of opinion and expression, and the right to access and share information and ideas. But alignment goes beyond Article 19.

Librarians also protect other human rights detailed in the UDHR, including freedom of thought, conscience and religion (Article 18), peaceful assembly and association (Article 20), confidentiality (Articles 1, 2, 3 and 6), privacy (Articles 3 and 12), education (Article 26), and participation in the cultural life of the community (Article 27).

Librarians protect and promote human rights on a societal level, serving as a cornerstone of democracy by helping people find quality information and develop the information literacy skills needed to be informed citizens and full participants in society. They also protect democracy by promoting transparency in government, informing people about their rights and benefits, providing programs on civic issues, and offering free meeting spaces for community organizations. In times of disaster, they serve as critical community hubs and communication centers.

Librarians protect and promote human rights on an individual level—–respecting and protecting the right to free and equitable access to information for all and providing resources for personal enrichment and growth. Librarianship is aligned with the human capabilities approach to development, which contributes to human rights by valuing and supporting the development of each person.

== Philosophy of American librarianship related to human rights ==
=== Core values ===
Human rights is a professional ethic that informs the practice of librarianship. The American Library Association (ALA), the profession's voice in the U.S., defines the core values of librarianship as equity & access, intellectual freedom & privacy, public good, and sustainability.

Information access is considered a "linchpin right" on which other human rights depend, because information is essential for supporting an informed citizenry that knows what their rights are and what their government is doing, or not doing, to respect those rights. Free and equal access to information also supports lifelong learning for all, whether for personal enrichment, building individual capabilities or for fulfillment of a goal, such as starting a business, learning new software, discovering cultural history or finding healthcare.

Equity & access, which are key action areas of the ALA, is central to the philosophy of librarianship. All people, "regardless of age, education, ethnicity, language, income, physical limitations or geographic barriers," should have access to the information they need. Among the many ways in which librarians work to serve all populations are by working to eliminate barriers to service, providing materials in different languages, hiring bilingual and bicultural staff, and offering literacy instruction and ESOL courses. The ALA has policies addressing free access by all, including minors, LGBT, people with disabilities, the imprisoned, people living in poverty, cultural minorities, homeless people, immigrants, and people of all ages. ALA policy also addresses diversity in terms of equity of access to information resources, services and technologies, especially for those who face language, cultural and other barriers.

The ALA's adoption of public good as a core organizational value suggests that librarians have a responsibility to resist threats to intellectual freedom and advocate for democratic principles and human rights; and to address through social action the root causes of such problems as discrimination, poverty and homelessness, which are barriers to full and equal participation.

=== Library Bill of Rights ===
The ALA Library Bill of Rights, which is considered the "central document" of librarianship, expresses the profession's policy on intellectual freedom. It rejects censorship and "affirms the ethical imperative to provide unrestricted access to information and to guard against impediments to open inquiry." The Library Bill of Rights, together with the Freedom to Read Statement, was instrumental in librarians' defense of intellectual freedom in the McCarthy era and is still cited regularly in response to challenges of library materials.

The Library Bill of Rights is an evolving document that has become more inclusive, expansive and firmer in its commitment to intellectual freedom since it was first adopted by ALA leadership in 1939. In 1961, for example, it was amended in support of civil rights, supporting the right to use a library regardless of "race, religion, national origins or political views." Its applicability to specific library issues has been codified by ALA leadership in a series of interpretations, including the reaffirmation of the right to privacy and confidentiality of library users (2002), linked to Article 12 of the UDHR (right to privacy).

The ALA made a strong, explicit statement in support of human rights in 1991 with The Universal Right to Free Expression: An Interpretation of the Library Bill of Rights. This interpretation refers to specific human rights enumerated in the UDHR as "inalienable rights of every person, regardless of origin, age, background, or views": freedom of thought, conscience and religion (Article 18); freedom of opinion and expression (Article 19); and freedom to peaceful assembly and association (Article 20). The ALA also declared that it "is unswerving in its commitment to human rights and intellectual freedom," noting that "the two are inseparably linked and inextricably entwined." It also "rejects censorship in any form" and advocates for the free flow of information internationally.

=== Other expressions of library philosophy linked to human rights ===
The ALA's Code of Ethics, which establishes the obligations and professional responsibilities of librarians, refers to "a profession explicitly committed to intellectual freedom and the freedom of access to information." Included in its ethical guidelines for librarians are protection of library users' privacy and confidentiality, and resistance to "all efforts to censor library resources."

Libraries: An American Value, adopted in 1999 and endorsed widely by ALA state chapters and divisions, communicated to the public the profession's commitment to assure free access to "books, ideas, resources and information." It includes pledges to defend the rights of people of all ages to use the library; to reflect diversity in resources and services; to protect individual privacy and confidentiality; and to contribute toward lifelong learning for all.

The ALA's Declaration for the Right to Libraries (2013–2014) refers to the UDHR in its preamble, along with the U.S. Declaration of Independence, as an inspiration for asserting that "libraries are essential to a democratic society" and that all people have a "right to quality libraries." It is based on the many roles of libraries: connecting people with the information and ideas they need, supporting literacy and lifelong learning; serving all people equitably, building communities; protecting the "right to know" and the "right to read;" creating a literate and informed society; advancing knowledge and research; and preserving cultural heritage.

The profession has also long expressed a global perspective on human rights. In 1978, an ALA International Relations Policy Statement pronounced support for intellectual freedom and human rights around the world, saying that "threats to the freedom of expression of any persons become threats to the freedom of all." In 1991, the ALA endorsed UDHR Article 19 as part of its international relations policy, pledging to work with other members of the International Federation of Library Associations and Institutions (IFLA) to support human rights and freedom of expression. An ALA resolution in 1997 on "IFLA, Human Rights and Freedom of Expression" explicitly linked the profession's defense of intellectual freedom and human rights. The ALA has also adopted a series of resolutions on international human rights and free expression over the years in response to specific infringements on human rights and the free flow of information in some countries.

In response to concerns about patron privacy after passage of the USA Patriot Act, the ALA passed a resolution in 2002 reaffirming the profession's commitment to intellectual freedom and confidentiality and its opposition to government intimidation, citing the "tolerance of dissent [as] the hallmark of a free and democratic society."

== Librarianship and human rights in praxis ==
The daily tasks of librarians are characterized as human rights work: helping people of all ages and all abilities find information and resources for enrichment, personal growth, lifelong learning, literacy, career, health, civic participation and much more.

Librarians, especially those who specialize in archival work, preserve and organize historical records, digitize them and make them accessible to all, including records of human rights abuses. Examples include the ALA's Human Rights Video Project, which provided documentary films on human rights topics free to hundreds of libraries for public screenings and discussions; and the University of Minnesota's Human Rights Library, which houses over 60,000 core human rights documents from over 150 countries.

Librarians provide resources and programs to advance childhood and adult literacy skills, which support civic participation and the ability to access and use information. Libraries provide a gateway to the internet for those who do not have access otherwise; and librarians offer digital and information literacy training.

Library culture often mirrors the attitudes and perspectives of their communities and time periods. Nonetheless, throughout the history of American librarianship, especially beginning in the mid-20th century, individuals and organizations have advocated for human rights. The issues and the way they are approached vary between time periods, people, and organizations but the evidence that librarians have been promoting human rights in the U.S. is irrefutable.

=== Freedom of information ===
"Librarians lead the battle for freedom of information ... Librarians carry information and knowledge beyond barriers imposed by the page or machine into the minds of people. Librarians not only use all sources of information, in all formats, but lead the effort to make them all accessible and understandable to the rest of society" John N. Berry III (1991)

Paul Sturges lists the following as necessary for a society that has achieved Freedom of Information:

- The absence of censorship
- whistleblower protections
- The presence of independent media

While modern American librarianship has shown wide support for the aforementioned conditions, it has had to negotiate a nuanced space when supporting the Freedom of Information. Therefore, librarians must balance combating censorship with promoting intellectual freedom, open access, privacy rights, and respecting the rights of authors. Hence, while librarians can be symbolically important voices in favor of the Freedom of Information, professional and communal considerations often limit their ability to fully endorse what full freedom of information would entail. State and national library organizations strive to remain aware of new or proposed FOI laws so that they can play a part in voicing concerns and improving bills, laws, and resolutions.

== The Freedom of Information Act ==
The Freedom of Information Act (FOIA) generally provides that any person has the right to request access to federal agency records or information except to the extent the records are protected from disclosure by any of nine exemptions contained in the law or by one of three special law enforcement record exclusions.

=== Intellectual freedom ===
The American Library Association defines intellectual freedom as the right of every individual, without restriction, to seek and receive information. It is based upon the idea that a stable and healthy democratic society progresses when ideas can be crafted and shared without social, political, or governmental restrictions. This American librarianship value is in line with First Amendment rights, established by the United States Constitution. Librarians strive to establish a balance along the spectrum of intellectual freedom - where on one side ideas flow unchecked, even harmful ones, and strict censorship exists on the other side. Librarianship allows for any person, regardless of their age, background, or beliefs to access information by any author despite whatever beliefs or viewpoints that author may hold. The individual has the freedom to decide how they express their own views and ideas as well as how they receive the views and ideas of others.

The first library in the United States to issue a formal intellectual freedom policy was the Chicago Public Library in 1936.

The American Library Association launched a Committee on Intellectual Freedom in 1940. Currently, the ALA also maintains an Office for Intellectual Freedom which was established in 1967, one year after the Freedom of Information Act (FOIA) was made law by the U.S. federal government.

In 1977, the ALA completed the controversial film The Speaker. The film details the fictionalized experience of a speaker who is denied the right to speak out on his offensive views concerning race. The main theme of the film was issues of intellectual freedom. ALA members debated whether or not the film should be released. but in the end the film was released.

In 1991 the ALA added Article 19 of the Universal Declaration of Human Rights to their policy manual.

Several state library organizations and associations possess Intellectual Freedom Committees, which routinely handle issues of intellectual freedom and the freedom of information.

Freedom from Economic Disadvantage

Libraries are also an important tool in information access to those who due to their economic situation would not normally have it. Important organizations such as Beyond Access play an important part in helping libraries around the world and specifically in poorer areas have the resources they need to provide the community with the information they need. Vulnerable populations such as the homeless, or mentally ill need libraries to speak on their behalf. Freedom of information does not apply only to the middle class or wealthy but to everyone and is an issue that libraries and governments have to contend with and not ignore.

=== Progressive librarianship and the Critical Library Movement ===
The Critical Library Movement describes the shift librarianship has taken towards an interest in social change. The critical library movement incorporates progressive librarianship, activist librarianship, socially responsible librarianship, radical librarianship, independent librarianship, alternative librarianship, and anarchist librarianship. The movement can be traced to the 1930s push, among library activists to get the ALA to play a larger role in responding to issues which included intellectual freedom, segregation, library unions, and peace. The movement has continued into the modern era and encompasses several forms of librarianship. Progressive librarianship, or socially responsible librarianship, is the movement of librarians who uphold the values which inform the Critical Library Movement.

Progressive librarianship entails active advocacy and maintains the view that librarianship should not strictly adhere to ideas of being neutral and apolitical. They believe that the library's role in a free and democratic society necessitates that libraries defend civil and independent democracy for all.

Not every librarian who believes in human rights is necessarily a progressive librarian or a part of the Critical Library Movement. Some librarians have vocally denounced library organizations and staff advocating for issues of social justice or issues that are not obviously and explicitly related to library and information services. Some librarians, such as David Berninghausen, argued that the Library Bill of Rights does not include or support taking positions on or getting involved in issues of war, pollution, promoting human brotherhood, upholding the separation of church and state, the voting age, the viability of higher education, or LGBT rights. They do not say that such issues are unimportant or must be ignored, but that getting involved with them in a professional capacity could destroy organizations and the profession. They believe that it is unethical for librarians to publicly take positions on matters not directly connected to librarianship. In the early 1970s this became known as "The Berninghausen Debate".

However, with the advent of many protests, such as the Occupy Wall Street Movement, and The People's Library many librarians have become politically active in protesting corporate globalization. The Progressive Librarians' International Coalition is an example of a network of librarians who have made human rights an integral part of their goals.

The Progressive Librarians' International Coalition

The Progressive Librarians' International Coalition is a network of progressive librarians formed as "a basis of principles/goals shared worldwide by critical librarians." Their goals are as follows:

1. We shall work towards an international agenda as the basis of common action of librarians everywhere actively committed, as librarians, to social justice, equality, human welfare and the development of cultural democracy.
2. We will unite librarians and information workers in opposition to the marketization of public goods, to privatization of social resources and to outsourcing of services and will oppose international treaties and institutions which advance destructive neo-liberal policies.
3. We insist upon the equality of access to and inclusiveness of information services, especially extending such services to the poor, marginalized and discriminated against, including the active solidarity-based provision of information assistance to these groups and their advocates in their struggles.
4. We shall encourage the exploration of alternative models of human services; promote and disseminate critical analysis of information technology's impact on libraries and societies; and support the fundamental democratization of existing institutions of education, culture, communications.
5. We shall undertake joint, interdisciplinary research into fundamental library issues.
6. We will support cooperative collection, organization and preservation of the documents of people's struggles and the making available of alternative materials representing a wide range of progressive viewpoints often excluded as resources from the debates of our time.
7. We will investigate and organize efforts to make the library-as-workplace more democratic and encourage resistance to the managerialism of the present library culture.
8. We will lead in promoting international solidarity among librarians and cooperation between libraries across borders on the basis of our joint commitment to the Universal Declaration of Human Rights and related covenants which create a democratic framework for constructive cooperative endeavors.
9. We will organize in common with other cultural and educational progressives, to help put issues of social responsibility on the agendas of international bodies such as IFLA and UNESCO.
10. We shall oppose corporate globalization which, despite its claims, reinforces existing social, economic, cultural inequalities and insist on a democratic globalism and internationalism which respects and cultivates cultural plurality, which recognizes the sovereignty of peoples, which acknowledges the obligations of society to the individual and communities and which prioritizes human values and needs over profits.

=== Progressive librarianship and women ===
==== History ====
Although there was a "Women's Meeting" at the 1882 14th American Libraries Conference, where issues concerning the salaries of women librarians and what female patrons do in reading rooms were discussed, librarians did not become formally active in feminist issues until over 80 years later.

In 1969 the first women's rights task force was founded, the National Women's Liberation Front for Librarians (NWFFL or New-Waffle). It was also in 1969 that children's librarians, after being unable to find children's books that included working mothers, worked to remedy the situation and succeeded in their efforts. This showed that librarians can work with publishers to diversify female representation in literature. There are many examples of women librarians who have and continue to pioneer new ways to make the library a more inclusive place for all. That list includes Clara Breed, Emily Wheelock Reed, Maria Moliner, and Vivian G. Harsh, just to name a few. Women have played a large part in the history of the library and the library's role in human rights.

Librarians can do more to help end gender discrimination and even violence. An integral tool in the fight against gender discrimination and violence against women is empowerment. In order to promote such empowerment, the abilities of individuals and women as a whole must be strengthened in lieu of positive action. Libraries can play a pivotal role in making the public aware of inaccuracies in gender stereotypes and the harmful effects of gender biases. They can also craft online paths or pathfinders in order to help women who have been affected by domestic violence so that they can be connected to the resources and information they need.

On September 14, 2016, Carla Hayden was sworn in as the 14th Librarian of Congress, making her the first woman Librarian of Congress and the first African American. She was nominated to this position by President Barack Obama. She was also the first African American to receive the Library Journal's award for Librarian of the Year for her work in the Pratt Library.

==== Equal Rights Amendment ====
The subject of women receiving equal pay for doing the same job as their male counterparts came up in librarianship long before the Equal Rights Amendment was proposed. In 1919, an American Library Association resolution sponsored by the New York Library Employees Union and promoting equal pay and opportunities for women in librarianship was defeated by a vote of 121 to 1. In 1970, Betty Wilson brought forth a resolution that would have the ALA refrain from using facilities that discriminate against women. That resolution was also defeated by the membership. However, in 1977 the American Library Association took a stand for the Equal Rights Amendment. The organization stated that they would no longer hold conferences in states that did not ratify the amendment, with the boycott measure set to take place in 1981. An ERA Task Force was formed in 1979 towards this goal and a sum of $25,000 was allocated towards task force operations in unratified states. At the time, a number of state library associations passed pro-ERA resolutions and formed committees on women in libraries.

=== Progressive librarianship and African Americans ===
==== History ====
Negative or inaccurate depictions of African Americans have long been reinforced through literature and popular culture. To counteract this inaccurate portrayal, librarians of various ethnic and cultural backgrounds, have worked with authors and publishers to ensure that racist stereotypes are kept out of books. Such efforts have been supported by Article 22 of the Universal Declaration of Human Rights.

Approximately 85 years ago African American children were routinely exposed to the negative images of African American people and their culture. Around the 1920s African American parents, librarians, and educators realized these depictions were detrimental to both African American and Caucasian children, and therefore, needed to be removed from library shelves. There was a need for writers to create educational books for children that could be more useful and much more truthful. In response, the Associated Publishers, an African American publishing company founded in 1927 and backed by African American authors, educators, and historical scholars such as Carter G. Woodson and Charles Wesley, began publishing informative books that taught the history and culture of African Americans.

Advocacy

In 1871, Daniel P. Murray began working in the Library of Congress and much of his career was concerned with positive representation of Blacks in the U.S. In 1899, Murray organized an exhibit on "Negro Authors" for the 1900 Paris Exhibition, which culminated in the work known as the "Preliminary List of Books and Pamphlets by Negro Authors". Murray's goal was to collect every text authored by every Black author in existence. His collection would eventually become the Library of Congress's "Colored Author Collection". Charlemae Rollins, who began working for the Chicago Public Library system in 1932, wrote several collection development guides which suggest titles that feature fair depictions of African Americans. Rollins also advocated for considering African American children in the collection development process; she also urged the inclusion of materials by Black authors. Through their outreach and their writing, Murray and Rollins present examples of African American librarians who advocated for fair and accurate representations of Black Americans in literature.

Librarians who were not African American also advocated for fairer representations in literature and public perceptions. Ernestine Rose (1880–1961) was one of the most progressive librarian voices of her time, believing that positive representations of African Americans in books could not only empower African Americans but also dispel harmful stereotypes among Caucasian patrons as well. She even contacted Daniel P. Murray after he'd retired with the express wish to make "one of the best Negro libraries in America" after recognizing the dearth of books on, about, and African Americans. Rose was also concerned with a diverse representation within librarianship. She deliberately diversified her workforce by hiring Nella Larson and Pura Belpré. Furthermore, Rose chaired the first meeting of the American Library Association's Work with Negroes Round Table in 1922.

==== Segregation: "The Silent Subject" ====
In 1896, The U.S. Supreme Court decision Plessy v. Ferguson establishes the "separate but equal" law that legalizes segregated libraries. This was the start of one of toughest battles in African American History. The Work With Negroes Round Table was approved as a temporary section of the American Library Association (ALA) during the 1921 Conference in Swampscott, MA in which there were no African American members. After the first meeting of the 1922 American Library Association's Work with Negro Round table convened, the temporary chairperson, Ernestine Rose who was a white librarian at the Harlem Branch Library in New York, ran the initial round table meeting. She worked with her integrated staff to conduct a survey on service to African Americans in public libraries. Out of the 122 survey questionnaires sent out they received ninety-eight responses. The responses reflected the inequity in how African Americans were hired and served by libraries across the U.S. The work of the round table ended in 1923, mainly because no one could agree on how to pursue a solution to the issue.

Issues involving segregated populations were especially prevalent in Rose's survey. However, it wasn't all in the communities themselves. Librarianship also struggled with issues of integrationist versus segregationist practices. In 1936, the American Library Association sent a letter that outlined the conditions African American libraries would need to agree to in order to attend: they would not be allowed to view the exhibits, register in hotels where white delegates were roomed, could not attend meetings where food would be served, and would have to sit in a segregated portion of halls for any sessions they might attend. They eventually decided not to hold conventions in places where all members could not fully attend, although the first integrated conference would not occur until 1956.

Despite the stance of the ALA, several librarians spoke out against segregation on an individual level. Librarians such as Ruth Brown, Juliette Hampton Morgan, and Emily Wheelock Reed either lost their jobs or were forced out of them for their pro-integrationist stances.

==== Efforts to Overcome ====
In 1960, the Library Journal and its editor, Eric Moon, began publishing a series of controversial editorials attacking segregationist practices and the ALA's perceived silence on the matter. Moon characterized segregation and the issues of unequal library service as "The Silent Subject." White southern librarians, like Rick Estes, gave credibility to the Library Journal's campaign by describing the detrimental effect of segregation on millions of African Americans. In 1961, the ALA added amendment V, supporting equal library access for all, to the Library Bill of Rights.

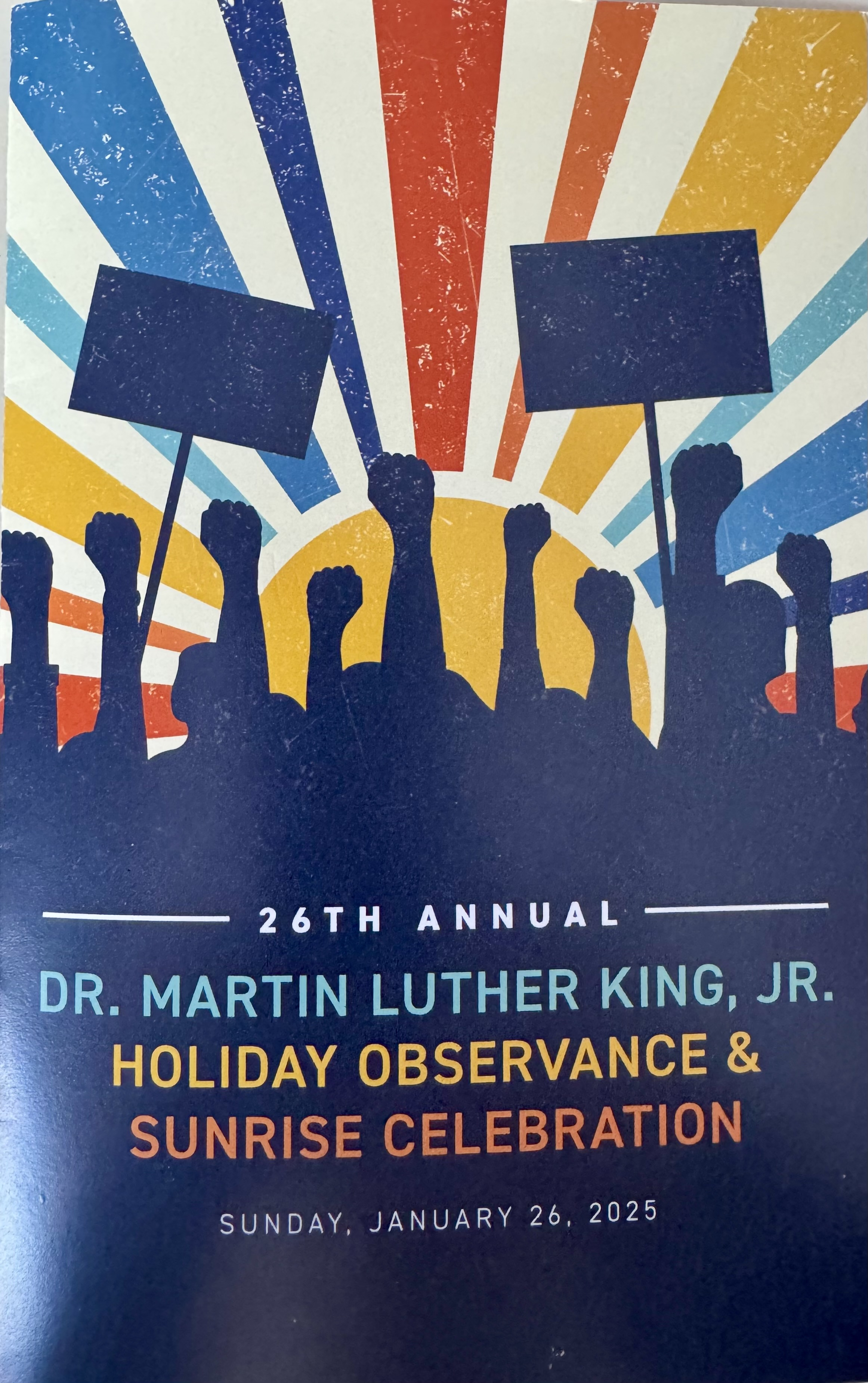
Cover of program at 26th Annual Dr. Martin Luther King, Jr. Holiday Observance & Sunrise Celebration. January 26, 2025. American Library Association

The Civil Rights Movement would continue throughout the 1960s with librarians aiding the effort. In 1964, as a part of the Freedom Summer initiative, twenty-five temporary Freedom Libraries opened in Mississippi. Freedom libraries could be found within community centers established for the Freedom Summer movement and were run by volunteers. The libraries, run by volunteers, aimed to support efforts in literacy, voting rights, and to allow access to materials in non-integrated areas.

Community outreach during the War on Poverty has been studied by Major Owens.

Tracey Overbey has studied the historical exclusion and disenfranchisement of Blacks and African Americans from libraries and educational institutions in the United States.

The American Library Association commemorates Dr. Martin Luther King Jr. at an annual sunrise service held at its conference.

A paper presented at the 2023 Association for Information Science and Technology conference, 'Get our feet wet and hands dirty': Black Community-Based Librarianship and the Fight Against Information Poverty, 1940-1975", describes the foundational role played by African American librarians in early community-based librarianship initiatives.

=== Progressive librarianship and homelessness ===
Libraries have traditionally been committed to providing information access to all patrons regardless of their status in society, but the issue of how to best serve the poor and homeless population has been a challenging issue. Homeless individuals continue to face certain barriers, especially when it comes to using library services that require library membership. For example, public libraries may require users to present a government photo ID with a residential address or other proof of residency within their locality when registering for a library card. Socially driven library policies regarding appearance and hygiene can also affect homeless library users and limit their access to library resources. Some libraries have enacted policies that address "'offensive body odor,' bathroom usage, or the presence of bulky bags and bedrolls in the library" in response to complaints from other patrons.

Many libraries, however, believe that "A central feature of public librarianship in the United States is that librarians have worked to develop a climate of openness by defining library policies to create an institution where all are welcome." Libraries are a part of the local community, and many have found ways to serve their communities. Many homeless and mentally ill individuals "come to the library for all sorts of reasons: to seek warmth and shelter, to use the restroom, to access the Internet, to meet friends and, yes, even to read books and newspapers. Many homeless individuals may also visit the library to apply for government assistance such as food, housing and other services available to them. One librarian estimates that about half of the library's regular patrons are either mentally ill or homeless." In light of these beliefs, especially since the start of the COVID-19 pandemic, public libraries around the United States have begun offering services and implementing programs that are directly aimed at helping homeless patrons. Public libraries in Denver, San Francisco, Chicago, Minneapolis, and Washington, D.C. have hired social workers who assist homeless patrons by establishing personal relationships with them and guiding them to find the help they need. The Kansas City Public Library holds a "Coffee and Conversations" program for homeless people every month in order to facilitate community among the city's homeless and to provide them with resources with which they might have difficulty connecting otherwise, such as legal advice. Offering these types of services and programs to homeless patrons gives librarians a way to proactively help instead of simply being "reactionary" to the homeless population's presence in their libraries.

The American Library Association has been active in helping libraries become more welcoming to homeless patrons. In 1990, they "implemented a policy on library services for the poor." The goal of the program was to "make sure libraries were open to [the poor] and to work on understanding poverty in the hopes of possibly finding out how to end it."

=== Progressive librarianship and immigrants ===
Historically, libraries have a strong connection to the immigrant population. Andrew Carnegie donated millions to opening libraries as a way to build "a place for immigrant self-education, enlightenment, and the study of democracy and English." Libraries are committed to provide equal access of information to all people, but through the years, there have been issues relating to the accessibility of information for those who are immigrants of varying status. At the 2006-2007 ALA Midwinter Meeting, the ALA passed a resolution in support of immigrant rights stating, "the ALA strongly supports the protection of each person's civil liberties, regardless of that individual's nationality, residency, or status; and, be it further resolved, that ALA opposes any legislation that infringes on the rights of anyone in the USA or its territories, citizens or otherwise, to use library resources, programs, and services on national, state, and local levels." This provided a starting point for libraries to provide various services to support immigrants in the community. For example, libraries were able to focus on building non-English collections. Librarians at the Chicago Public Library developed a world-language collection that spanned over 200 languages. In addition, the ALA's partnership with the Dollar General Literacy Foundation, through American Dream grants, have funded over 100 libraries.

Prior to this, in 2004, the United States Citizenship and Immigration Services department published a report identifying partnerships in the community to better serve the immigrant population. The USCIS focused on libraries as a way to bridge the resource gap. The report outlined various ways libraries could provide resources to the immigrant population that included programming, incorporating immigrants on advisory councils and working groups, and outreach. The USCIS has continued to rely on libraries to fill a critical role in serving immigrant communities. They have partnered with the IMLS to "educate librarians, and in turn their immigrant customers, on topics ranging from naturalization, the unauthorized practice of immigration law, and the importance of digital literacy." Through the resources provided by the USCIS, libraries are creating "Citizenship Corners" as a way to provide information to immigrants to help them prepare for the citizenship interview and test. With resources provided by the USCIS, libraries are able to disseminate necessary information for immigrants who are seeking naturalization. Libraries are also providing naturalization information sessions and becoming hosts for administrative naturalization ceremonies.

Access to All to Every Library: Inclusive actions and Universal Design

In the United States, the Americans with disability Act (ADA) paved the way for access to all who required accommodations or modifications. Not every country in the world has required law for those in need. It is necessary to make sure to provide equity among all patrons. The term equity was used, because things are put in place to help those that need it; even though all do not need accommodations and modifications it is helpful for all to be fair and impartial which gives those with disabilities the feeling of acceptance within that adapted space.

Libraries generally are required to provide access to all. "The design of all public areas of a library shall comply with 8 (ADA reference to libraries), including reading and study areas, stacks, reference rooms reserve areas and special facilities or collections." Therefore, space between furniture must be a distance clearance to allow wheelchair pass through or a minimum width of 42 inches. Having this as a standard also allows walking space for those traveling in different directions as well as wheeling carts to move materials stored in the library. Along with space between the books and other furniture in the library.

=== Progressive librarianship and prison populations ===
==== History ====
Historically, early 19th century prisons in the United States had collections of materials for the "moral and religious education" of their prisoners, and it was members of the clergy that served as librarians. Later in the 19th century, during the Prison Reform Movement, which advocated rehabilitation into society and education, rather than retribution for crimes committed; prison libraries were available as an incentive for good behavior. Prison administrators approved library use and materials provided, usually materials that "furthered the reformative goals" of the movement. In the 1930s the ALA and the American Correctional Association (ACA) published a manual directing the proper materials that should be made available for inmates. Through the 1970s prison libraries grew at an unprecedented rate. A major factor was the authorization of Congress for the Library Services and Construction Act (LSCA), providing federal funding for "institutional library services." Furthermore, the U.S. Supreme Court decision of Bounds v. Smith, 430. U.S. 817 (1977) "stipulated that all prisons must provide 'meaningful access to the courts through people trained in the law or through law library collections.'" In 1996, the Supreme Court decision of Lewis v. Casey decision (518 U.S. 804), narrowed it earlier interpretations and limited the boundaries within which the correctional facilities were required to provide concerning legal assistance and resources. As a result, prison library collections were reduced or eliminated altogether, or simply not updated.

Today the challenges prison libraries face range from the accessing materials to the lack of materials, from the lack of resources and programs to having to cope with untraditional learning environments. Further, prisoners don't receive the appropriate training on the proper technology to utilize those materials and resources they have accessed. The fastest growing population in prisons is the elderly, due primarily to longer sentences and limited parole. Many facilities are overcrowded, and the incarceration rate of ethnic minorities is high, including the growing population of non- or limited English speaking inmates. Research shows that between 50 and 60 percent of prisoners and inmates did not finish high school.

The ALA’s Office for Diversity, Literacy and Outreach Services (ODLOS) maintains a webpage with links that may be helpful for prison librarians, including documents, statistics, and facts about the criminal justice system. In 2021, a task force of correctional library workers and other institutional stakeholders headed by ODLOS began work on a massive reimagining of the American Library Association's 1992 Library Standards for Adult Correctional Institutions.

== Historical milestones ==
=== Colonial America ===
Colonial America in the 1700s saw an expansion in printing industry, precipitating a culture shift from the idea that only the wealthy should have access to books and to education, to the premise of equitable access to education and books for all society. Earlier, in 1638, Harvard University established the first institutional library, and, over a hundred and twenty years later, in 1764, Harvard's library had an amassed 5,000 volumes of books.

=== Boston Public Library and social responsibility ===
Historically, the library profession's claim to neutrality has drawn a line between professional issues such as literacy and so-called non-library issues such as war, politics, segregation, and poverty.

While not explicitly employing the term social responsibility, the July 1852 Report of the Trustees of the Boston Public Library makes clear that the library has two primary social obligations:

1. To equalize and maximize individual opportunities to participate in civil society while fighting conflicting cultural, political, and social influences; and
2. To provide the public with a means of developing a uniquely American culture, founded on the notion of an engaged citizenship. The notion of social responsibility has long been at the center of the professional ideology that grounds thought and justifies practice in librarianship.

Additionally, the idea that people agree to tax themselves for the support of the public library – an institution that activates human capabilities; diminishes the division between people of different classes; and provides access to information – is an indicator of our society's commitment to fundamental human rights, democracy, and social responsibility.

=== 1930s – 1950s ===
- 1936 - The Chicago Public Library issues the first intellectual freedom policy.
- 1939 - The first banning of the book The Grapes of Wrath by John Steinbeck occurs during a transformative time for librarianship in the United States and its response to the issue of intellectual freedom. Most significant was the ban in Kern County, California, the main setting of the novel. This ban was likely a product of the desire of groups who had financial interests in California corporate farming to protect those interests, rather than the professed reason of obscenity.
- 1939 - The Library Bill of Rights is adopted by the American Library Association; it is the American Library Association's statement expressing the rights of library users to intellectual freedom and the expectations the association places on libraries to support those rights.
- 1939 - The Progressive Librarians Council (PLC) is founded by Philip Keeney and Mary Jane Keeney. Begins publishing the PLC Bulletin.
- 1940 - The PLC adopts a Statement of Purpose which lists certain aims pertinent to human rights: promotion of federal and state aid to libraries, support of the ALA's Committee on Intellectual Freedom, and opposition to involvement in the war.
- 1941 - The PLC adopts several resolutions after the annual meeting in Boston. The resolutions state the organization's positions on racial discrimination, cooperation with organized labor, salaries, civil rights of library workers and users, and continued aid to library workers seeking asylum (refugees coming to the United States from Fascist Europe).
- 1944 - The PLC disbands after the Organization Round Table and the Unions Round Table gain momentum and the number of round tables increase.
- 1956 - For many years the ALA avoided meeting in the South due to racial segregation. This was the year that ALA held its first integrated conference located in Miami Beach.

=== 1960s – 1970s ===
- February 2, 1961 - the American Library Association (ALA) established Amendment V to the Library Bill of Rights to state, "A person's right to use a library should not be denied or abridged because of origin, age, background, or views".
- 1964 - The passage of the Library Services and Construction Act (LSCA) provides crucial funding for developing library services and collections for ethnic, disadvantaged, and under-served groups.
- 1969 - The ALA's Social Responsibilities Round Table (SRRT) is formed as a forum to promote social responsibility as a core value of librarianship. Today, SRRT includes several task forces: Feminist Task Force; Hunger, Homelessness, and Poverty Task Force (HHPTF); International Responsibilities Task Force; Martin Luther King Jr. Holiday Task Force (MLKTF); The Rainbow Project Task Force; and Task Force on the Environment.
- 1970 - The ALA's Social Responsibilities Round Table Feminist Task Force (FTF) is established by women who wish to address sexism in libraries and librarianship. FTF was the first ALA group to focus on women's issues.
- 1970 - The ALA's first LGBT forum, Task Force on Gay Liberation, is formed. This organization, now known as the Rainbow Round Table, is the oldest LGBT professional organization in the United States.
- 1971 - The National Association to Promote Library and Information Services to Latinos and the Spanish Speaking (REFORMA) is established by the ALA in order to promote librarianship in the Spanish-Speaking community. Such efforts include building collections of resources in the Spanish language and recruiting Latin Americans in librarianship.
- 1976 - Clara Stanton Jones becomes ALA's first African American president.
- 1976 - The Committee on the Status of Women in Librarianship (COSWL) of the ALA is founded; it represents the diversity of women's interests within ALA and ensures that the Association considers the rights of the majority (women) in the library field, and promotes and initiates the collection, analysis, dissemination, and coordination of information on the status of women in librarianship. The bibliographic history of women in U.S. librarianship and women librarians developing services for women has been well-documented in the series of publications initially issued by the Social Responsibilities Round Table Task Force on Women and later continued by COSWL.

=== 1980s – 1990s ===
- 1982 - ALA institutes its first Banned Books Week, championing intellectual freedom and the right to read through the celebration of challenged literary works.
- Mid-1980s - The Reference and Adult Services Division of the ALA has a discussion group titled "Women's Materials and Women Library Users," is formed.
- 1990 - The Progressive Librarians Guild (PLG) is formed, and through membership in the ALA and organizational affiliation with the ALA's Social Responsibilities Round Table (SRRT), its members have been outspoken about social responsibility and human rights in the library community.
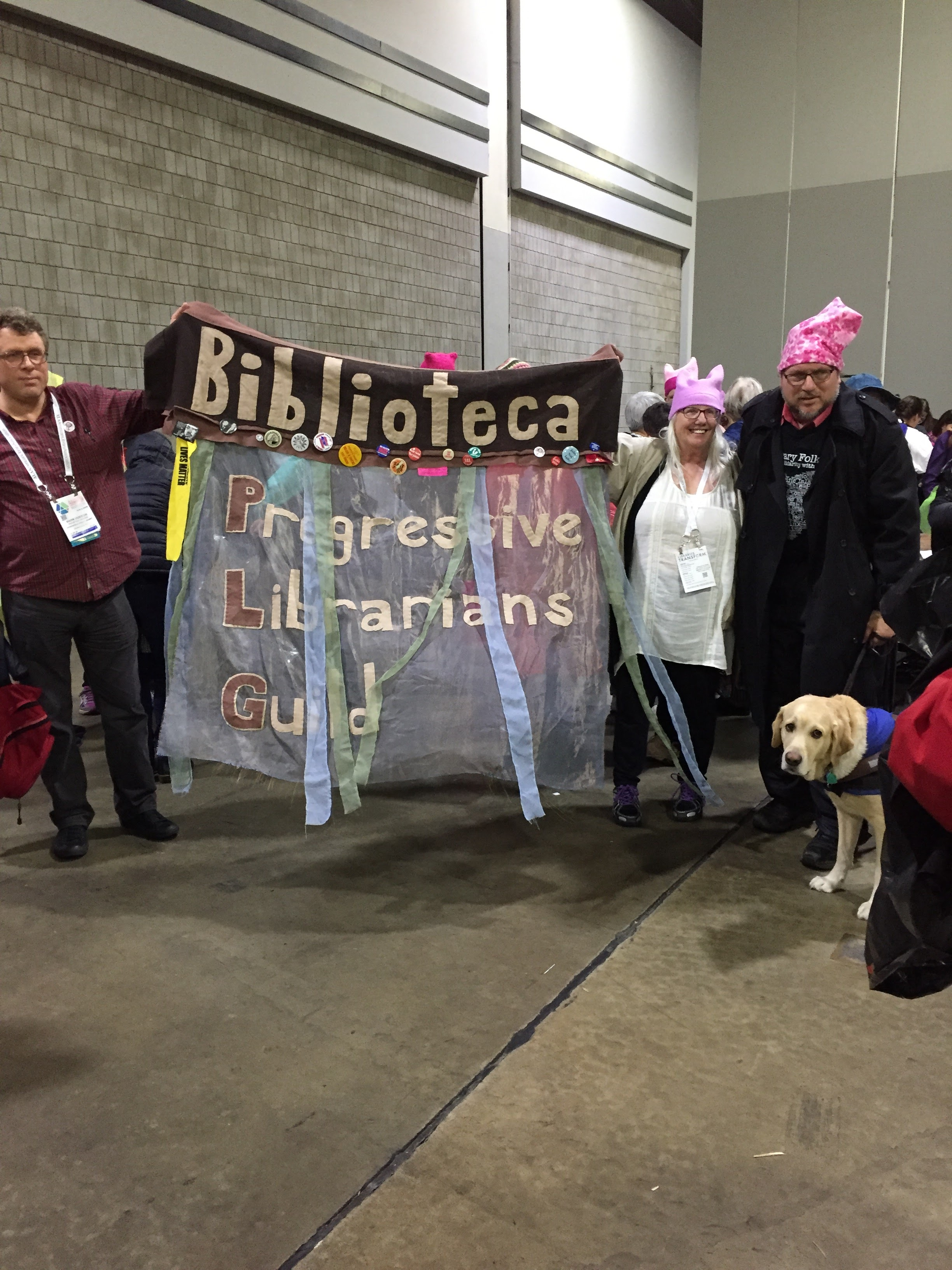
  Progressive Library Guild members, American Library Association MW Atlanta, 1.21.2017
- 1991 - ALA adopts Article 19 of the Universal Declaration of Human Rights into policy.
- 1996 - Members of ALA's Social Responsibilities Round Table (SRRT) form the Hunger, Homelessness, and Poverty Task Force (HHPTF) to promote Policy 61 and encourage awareness of the many dimensions of poverty, such as the causes of poverty and ways it can be addressed.
- 1997 - "IFLA Resolution on Human Rights and Freedom of Expression" is adopted.
- 1999 - "American Libraries: An American Value" is adopted, affirming librarians' support of human rights.

=== 2000 to present ===
- 2001 - Following the September 11 attacks, Uniting and Strengthening America by Providing Appropriate Tools Required to Intercept and Obstruct Terrorism Act (USA PATRIOT Act) requires libraries to provide patron records to the FBI upon request. In response, the ALA passes the "Resolution Reaffirming the Principles of Intellectual Freedom in the Aftermath of Terrorist Attacks" and "Revisions and Updates on Privacy: An Interpretation of the Library Bill of Rights," in 2002.
- 2004 - The ALA passes "A Resolution Against the Use of Torture as a Violation of our Basic Values as Librarians."
- 2004 - Grupo de Estudios Sociales and Bibliotecología y Documentación (Social Studies Group on Librarianship and Documentation) and Circulode Estudios sobre Bibliotecologia Politica y Social (Study Circle on Political and Social Librarianship) write a manifesto entitled Declaration from Buenos Aires on Information, Documentation and Libraries that recognizes that any type of library is a cultural commodity and resource that is promoted and protected by democratic values.
- 2005 - The "Privacy Tool Kit" is developed by the ALA as a means to assist libraries and librarians in navigating information privacy concerns. Four Connecticut librarians challenge the constitutionality of the non-disclosure provisions of the National Security Letters (NSL) and take their case to the Supreme Court.
- 2005 - The Bibliotheca Alexandrina adopts the Alexandria Manifesto on Libraries, the Information Society in Action.
- 2007 - The ALA Human Rights Video Project is created to provide libraries with video collections to increase the public's awareness of human rights issues.
- 2011 - The People's Library also known as the Occupy Wall Street Library was a collection developed for the use of community members as well as a collection of materials documenting the Occupy Wall Street movement which protested economic inequality, corporate greed and corruption.
- 2013 - Library of Congress Acquires Papers of Gay-Rights Pioneer Lilli Vincenz .
- 2014 - The Ferguson Public Library (Missouri) remains open through civil unrest.
- 2015 - Enoch Pratt Free Library, Baltimore, MD stayed open and welcoming to local residents, media and anyone else who needed then during civil unrest following the death of Freddie Gray. "It's at times like this that the community needs us," said Roswell Encina, library director of communications.. "That's what the library has always been here for, from crises like this to a recession to the aftermath of severe weather. The library has been there. It happened in Ferguson; it's happening here."
- 2016 - Dr. Carla Hayden, the first woman and first African American to be appointed to the post of Librarian of Congress.
- 2016 - Flint Public Library Responds to Water Crisis - Though the city stated that the water was safe, the employees of the Flint Public Main Library declared the water undrinkable after noticing that the water from the faucets and toilets was discolored. They contracted with a company called "Absopure to bring in water coolers for both the public and staff areas" and have been providing clean drinking water there at the library since August 2014.
- 2016 #PulseOrlandoSyllabus is compiled by librarians and teachers as a living document on Google Drive.
- 2018 - Renaming planned for Saint Petersburg Main Library after President Barack Obama and coincided with President's Day and Black History Month.
- 2018 - 70th Anniversary of the Declaration of Human Rights; UN Human Rights office kicks of celebration with new website
- 2022. Buffalo and Erie County Public Library May 14 Project is collecting, documenting and preserving an intentional and authentic record of the 2022 Buffalo shooting.
- 2023. The ALA "Expanding Information Access for Incarcerated People Initiative" developed "New Standards for Library Services for the Incarcerated and Detained."

=== Current and future concerns for the 21st century ===
Though many positive steps have been made, librarianship continues to face challenges to democracy, social responsibilities, and human rights. In recent years, libraries have banned homeless people from checking out books or even using the library's restrooms; books with homosexual themes have been moved to "adult only" areas; gay pride displays have been ordered down; Spanish-language materials have been refused to be purchased; and the Children's Internet Protection Act (CIPA) and Deleting Online Predators Act (DOPA) have aimed to limit access to information available on the Internet.

Censorship, intellectual freedom, closing of libraries, and discrimination remain critical issues for librarianship. Despite these challenges, librarians are fighting back against budget cuts and closures, providing access to materials, protecting the freedom of inquiry, and allowing groups to meet in their common areas. The ALA provides numerous tools to libraries and librarians and has developed several task forces to cover human rights issues. The ALA's 2015 Strategic Plan envisions a future in which librarians are committed to diversity, globalization of information, intellectual freedom, and social responsibility for the public good. McCook and Phenix (2011) argue that the Universal Declaration of Human Rights can provide libraries with a widely understood international document that can be used to guide development of policy, and services that help maintain policy.

In a 2017 interview Deidre Conkling, ALA SRRT Coordinator, observed: "Today, just following the mission of libraries we are being thrown into an activist roll. When we stand up to other people and government agencies in support of free access to information today we are suddenly activists, even though this is what we have done for years. It is our job to fight for free access to information and to support the retention of all kinds of information, especially information created by our government agencies. We are now on the front lines of activism."

Mathiesen has proposed that governments have an obligation to create and fund public libraries, because access to them is a human right. Starting with the Universal Declaration of Human Rights, and appealing to recent work in Human Rights Theory, she argues that there is a right to information, which states are obligated to fulfill. Given that libraries are highly effective institutions for ensuring that this right is fulfilled, there is a derived human right to a public library.

The essay, "True Community: Connecting the Millennium Development Goals to Public Library Services in the United States" asserts that U.S. public libraries have the potential to actively participate in realizing the collective vision of the eight Millennium Development Goals (MDGs).

== Notable individuals ==
The following individuals are noted for their contributions to the cause of human rights and the field of librarianship:

- Joan Airoldi – asserted that libraries have the right to protect the confidentiality of their patrons when the Federal Bureau of Investigation demanded that her library's staff provide the names of all patrons who borrowed a book about Osama bin Laden following the September 11, 2001 attacks
- Sanford Berman – worked toward removal of bias in Library of Congress classification
- Patricia Swift Blalock – instrumental in desegregating the public library in Selma, Alabama
- Clara Breed – supported Japanese-American children in internment camps during World War II by visiting them and sending them books and correspondence
- Ruth Brown – dismissed from her position at the Bartlesville, Oklahoma library in 1950 after 30 years of service due to her work in civil rights activities with the Congress of Racial Equality
- Andrew Carnegie – philanthropist whose belief in access to information helped lay the foundation for public libraries
- Connecticut Four – individuals who challenged The Patriot Act as it relates to library records
- Barbara Gittings – advocated for gay and lesbian librarianship
- Carla Hayden – first woman and African American Librarian of Congress.
- Elaine Harger – Herb Biblo Outstanding Leadership Award for Social Justice and Equality from the American Library Association, Social Responsibilities Round Table.
- Zoia Horn – first United States librarian jailed for refusing to share information as a matter of conscience
- Agnes Inglis – architect of the Labadie Collection at the University of Michigan
- E.J. Josey-first chair of the Black Caucus of the American Library Association.
- Philip Keeney – founded the Progressive Librarians Council
- Dana Lubow and Rhonda Neugebauer – organized rural outreach services to Cuba by purchasing, repairing, equipping, and filling a bookmobile with Spanish-language books that were delivered from Los Angeles to places in Cuba that were far from the country's public libraries
- Marvin Scilken – activist librarian who exposed price fixing for library books
- Forrest Spaulding – drafted the Library Bill of Rights
- Arnulfo D. Trejo – promoted librarianship among the Latino and Spanish-speaking communities and started the movement to increase literature and collections in the Spanish language to libraries in the U.S.

== Notable organizations ==
=== Joint Conference of Librarians of Color ===
The Joint Council of Librarians of Color (JCLC, Inc.) advocates for and addresses the common needs of the National Associations of Librarians of Color. The first Joint Conference of Librarians of Color was held in Dallas, October 12–15, 2006, the second was held in 2012 in Kansas City, Missouri, the third was held in held in 2018 in Albuquerque, New Mexico, the fourth was held in 2023 in St. Pete Beach, Florida.

=== Organizations ===
The organizations listed below exemplify the link between libraries, librarianship and human rights:

- American Association of Law Libraries (AALL) – founded in 1906 – Committed to access to permanent public access to government legal information
- American Library Association (ALA) – founded in 1876 – Dedicated to the advancement of librarianship and many related human rights issues
- ALA Young Adult Library Services Association (YALSA) - established in 1957 - YALSA is a national association of librarians, library workers and advocates whose mission is to expand the capacity of libraries to better serve teens.
- ALA Social Responsibilities Round Table (SRRT) – founded in 1969 – Focuses on human and economic rights
- ALA Rainbow Round Table (RRT) – founded in 1970 - Committed to the information needs of the LGBTQIA+ community
- Association of Research Libraries – founded in 1932 – Committed to open and equitable access to information
- Black Caucus of the American Library Association(BCALA) – founded in 1970 – Advocates for library services to the African American community
- Institute of Museum and Library Services – founded in 1996 – Provides support for issues such as lifelong learning, cultural heritage, and access to knowledge
- ALA Intellectual Freedom Roundtable – Promotes the tenets of intellectual freedom
- International Federation of Library Associations and Institutions (IFLA) – founded in 1927 – Currently promotes freedom of information as stated in the Universal Declaration of Human Rights
- Medical Library Association (MLA) – founded in 1898 – Committed to health information literacy and concerned with open access
- The National Association to Promote Library and Information Services to Latinos and the Spanish Speaking (REFORMA) – founded in 1971 - Advocates for library services to the Spanish-speaking and Latino community
- The People’s Library - 2011 – Library created during the Occupy Wall Street movement
- Progressive Librarians Guild (PLG) – founded in 1990 – Addresses issues of librarianship and human rights
- Public Library Association (PLA) – founded in 1944 – Dedicated to public library service including an emphasis on literacy
- Que(e)rty - founded in 2010 - Established by the New York state organization, The Desk Set. This group creates a safe space for LGBT librarians in order to support various human rights issues
- Urban Libraries Council– founded in 1971 – Focuses on education and lifelong learning, digital evolution and sustainable communities
- ALA Ethnic & Multicultural Information Exchange Round Table (EMIERT) - founded in 1982 - Committed to serve as a source of information on recommended ethnic collections, services, and programs.

== U.S. librarianship and human rights awards ==
=== American Library Association Equality Award ===
The American Library Association Equality Award is bestowed annually by the American Library Association in recognition of achievement for outstanding contribution toward promoting equality in the library profession, either by a sustained contribution or a single outstanding accomplishment. The award may be given for an activist or scholarly contribution in such areas as pay equity, affirmative action, legislative work and non-sexist education.

=== Additional Awards by Library Associations ===
Awards conferred by library organizations to encourage and acknowledge individuals who support various issues in human rights. This is a list of some of those awards.

==== American Library Association Awards ====
- American Association of School Libraries (AASL) Intellectual Freedom Award - annual, established 1982 - Awarded to AASL members who uphold the principles of intellectual freedom as outlined by the AASL.
- Coretta Scott King Award - annual, established 1969 - Awarded to an African American writer and illustrator whose work shows an appreciation for African American culture and universal human values.
- Gerald Hodges Intellectual Freedom Chapter Relations Award - established in 1984- awarded to the most innovative and effective intellectual freedom project covering a state or region.
- Herb Biblo Outstanding Leadership Award for Social Justice and Equality-Social Responsibilities Round Table of the American Library Association.
- Jean E. Coleman Library Outreach Lecture-presented at the annual conference of the American Library Association with a focus on equity of access and outreach to the underserved.
- Pura Belpré Award - annual, established 1996 - Awarded to a Latina/Latino illustrator and writer whose work best affirm, portray, and celebrate the cultural experience of Latinos.
- Stonewall Book Awards - three annual awards, established 1971 - The first awards for LGBT books in the U.S. The awards recognize merit in portraying the gay, lesbian, bisexual, and transgender experience. The individuals awards are: The Mike Morgan and Larry Romans Children's and Young Adult Literature Award, The Israel Fisher Non-Fiction Award, and The Barbara Gittings Literary Award.

==== Other Library Association or Institutional Awards ====
- Miriam Braverman Award - annual - Awarded by the Progressive Librarians Guild to library and information science students who submit essays on some aspect of social responsibility and librarianship.
- Robert B. Downs Intellectual Freedom Award - annual, established* 1969 - Awarded to individuals and groups who further the cause of intellectual freedom, especially as they concern libraries and information centers.
- Trejo Librarian of the Year Award – REFORMA award to the top candidate for promotion and advocating of library services to and meeting unmet needs of Latino and Spanish-speaking communities. Named for Arnulfo Trejo, founder of REFORMA.
- Schneider Family Book Award - honors an author or illustrator for a book which embodies the disability experience for children and adolescent audiences.
- The American Indian Youth Literature Awards - presented every two years, this award honors and identifies outstanding works written and illustrated by and about Native American and Alaskan Natives.
- Middle Eastern Book Award - established in 1999, this award honors and recognizes books for children and young adults which contribute meaningful insights to the Middle East and its culture and component societies.
- Asian/Pacific American Award - honors and recognizes individual work(s) about Asian/Pacific Americans and their heritage, based on literary and artistic merit.
- Arab American Book Award - The Arab American Book Awards is a literary program produced by the Arab American National Museum that honors books written by and about Arab Americans to garner awareness of Arab American scholarship through educational outreach.
