= Zoia Horn =

American librarian and human rights activist

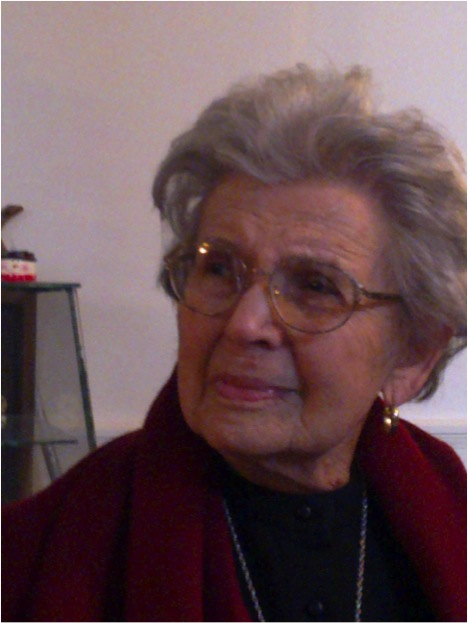
- Zoia Horn at the Internet Archive in 2010
- Born: Zoia Markovna Polisar; March 14, 1918; Odesa, Ukraine
- Died: July 12, 2014 (aged 96); Oakland, California, United States
- Education: Brooklyn College & Pratt Institute Library School
- Occupations: Librarian and Freedom of speech activist
- Spouse: R. Dean Galloway (1971)
- Awards: Robert B. Downs Intellectual Freedom Award (2002), Jackie Eurbanks Memorial Award (2002)

Zoia Markovna Horn (née Polisar; March 14, 1918 – July 12, 2014) was an American librarian who in 1972 became the first United States librarian to be jailed for refusing to share information as a matter of conscience. Horn, an outspoken member of the American Library Association's Intellectual Freedom Committee, worked at Bucknell University in Lewisburg, Pennsylvania, in the early 1970s. Horn was jailed for nearly three weeks for contempt of court after refusing to testify for the prosecution in the 1972 conspiracy trial of the "Harrisburg Seven" anti-war activists.

== Early life ==
Horn was born in Odesa, Ukraine in 1918, to a secular Jewish family of small businessmen and shopkeepers. She emigrated with her family to Canada in 1926 at the age of 8, then to New York City where she attended Brooklyn College and the Pratt Institute Library School. She first began working at a library in 1942.

In 1964, she won a Humanities Fellowship to the University of Oregon where she became active in librarians' organizations and conferences. She began working at the UCLA library in 1965, where she participated in daily vigils protesting the Vietnam War. She later recalled that she attended the protests "always wearing good shoes and gloves, the proper lady-librarian," hoping to show that war protesters were "ordinary folks." In 1968, she was hired as Head of the Reference Department at Bucknell University in Lewisburg, Pennsylvania, where she continued to work with peace activists.

=== Harrisburg Seven trial ===
In January 1971, Horn was contacted by the FBI, seeking evidence involving Philip Berrigan. Berrigan, a Roman Catholic priest and anti-war activist, was serving a sentence in a nearby federal prison for burning draft files concerning the Vietnam War. Berrigan, from his jail cell, was alleged to be plotting along with six other individuals (Harrisburg Seven), to blow up heating tunnels beneath Washington, D.C., and to kidnap Henry Kissinger, the national security adviser to President Richard Nixon.

Boyd Douglas, a prisoner in Lewisburg Federal Penitentiary on a work/study program who also worked at the Bucknell library, relayed letters, allegedly including anti-war plot details and love letters, from fellow anti-war activists, including Sister Liz McAlistair, to Berrigan in prison. Horn and another library employee at Bucknell testified before a grand jury. During the trial, they were subpoenaed to testify for the prosecution, but Horn refused to testify at the trial on the grounds that her forced testimony would threaten intellectual and academic freedom. In addition, Horn was anti-war and claimed that "...the defendants, had been taking whatever steps presented to themselves to stop the killing in Vietnam and the brutalization of people that comes with war. I needed to know that my decision [to not testify] would not harm them."

Horn served 20 days in Dauphin County Jail, but was released after the prosecution's case was found unreliable. At the time, the Los Angeles Times published a UPI photograph of Horn being taken from the courthouse in handcuffs and reported: "Mrs. Zoia Horn Galloway, a former Bucknell University librarian, was jailed for contempt ... after refusing to testify despite being granted immunity."

On her first night in prison, a group of about 20 people sang outside the jailhouse protesting for both her and Philip Berrigan's releases.

Horn was jailed for almost three weeks, "for refusing to testify for the prosecution in the sensational trial of anti-war activists accused of a terrorist plot." In a written statement to the judge, in place of her verbal testimony, Horn stated:

It is because I respect the function of this court to protect the rights of the individual, that I must refuse to testify...I love and respect this country too much to see a farce made of the tenets upon which it stands. To me it stands on: Freedom of thought — but government spying in homes, in libraries and universities inhibits and destroys this freedom. It stands on freedom of association — yet in this case gatherings of friends, picnics, parties have been given sinister implications. It stands on freedom of speech — yet general discussions have been interpreted by the government as advocates of conspiracies. The realities of overt killings in Vietnam have been obscured by the unrealities that I have encountered here...

Horn believed that she was not a revolutionary for refusing to testify, arguing that she was simply "against violence" and did not believe in guns.

=== Later work for academic freedom ===
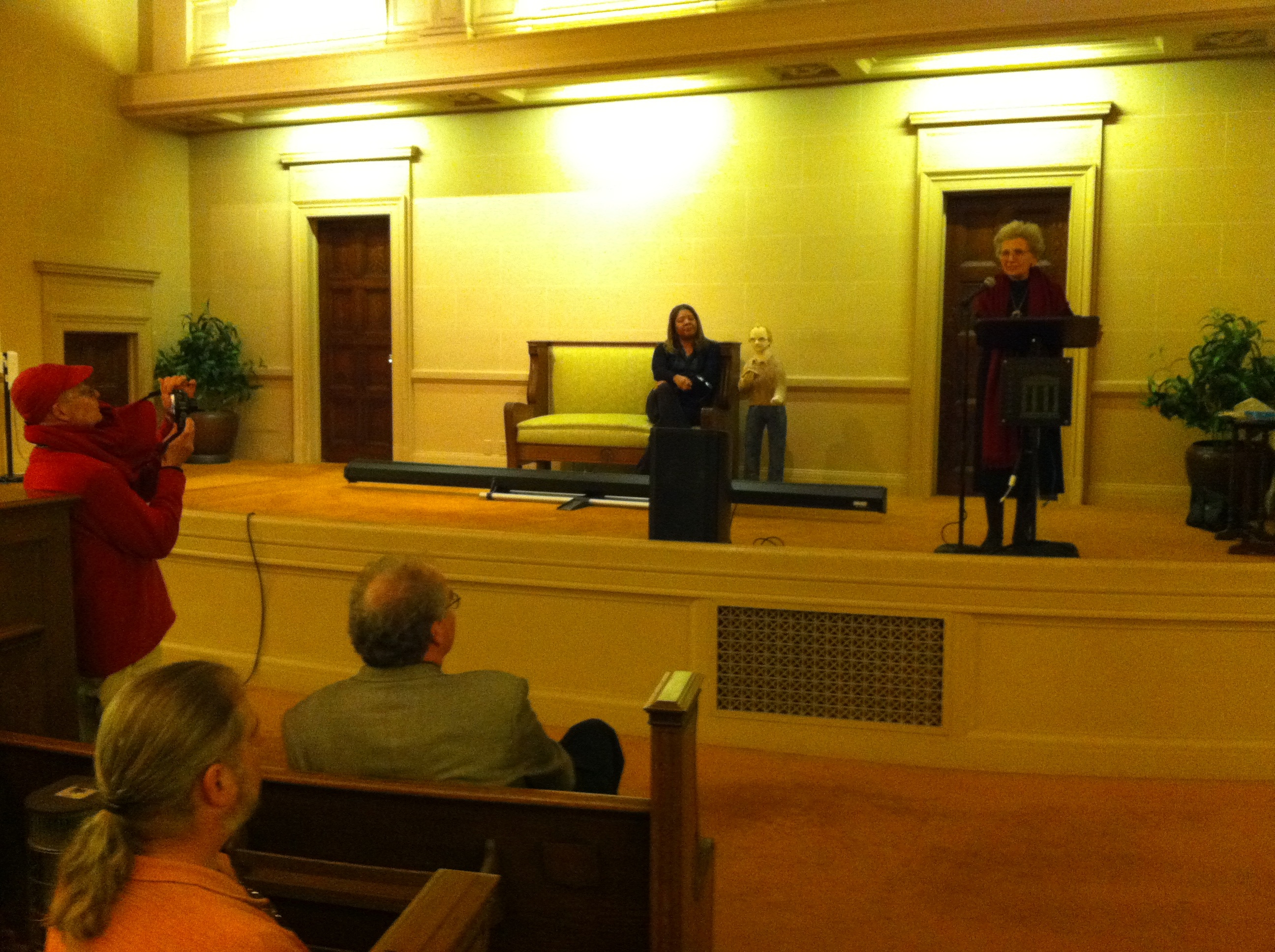
Zoia Horn presenting an Intellectual Freedom Award to Brewster Kahle at the Internet Archive (2010)

After her release from prison, Horn continued to speak out on issues of academic and intellectual freedom. At first, the American Library Association's executive board refused publicly to support Horn's stand against the government's attempts to intimidate and silence Vietnam War protesters. Later, after questioning Horn for hours, the Board reversed its stance and officially commended Horn for her "commitment...in defense of intellectual freedom." Eventually she was given assistance by the association's Social Responsibilities Round Table, as well as the Leroy Merritt Humanitarian Fund and the Freedom to Read Foundation. Judith Krug, longtime director of the American Library Association's Office for Intellectual Freedom, has called Horn "the first librarian who spent time in jail for a value of our profession."

In 1971, Horn proposed a resolution for the ALA to assert "freedoms to think, communicate, and discuss..are essential elements of intellectual freedom, that these freedoms have been threatened by our federal government's use of informers, electronic surveillance, grand juries, and indictments."

In 1995, Horn published her memoirs, titled ZOIA! Memoirs of Zoia Horn, Battler for the People's Right to Know. In its review of Horn's memoirs, the Library Journal called Horn "a courageous crusader." Horn continued to speak out on issues of intellectual freedom, including writing an article on a small-city Oklahoma librarian who was dismissed by the City Commission after being accused of supplying "subversive" materials (including subscriptions to The Nation, The New Republic and Soviet Russia Today) at the library. She also defended a gay librarian in Oakland, California, who was "attacked for creating a display of gay library materials," and speaking out against the Patriot Act. She spoke in opposition to libraries' proposals to charge fees, arguing that the "payment of any fee in a public library" resembles censorship in creating "barriers to information access." In 2002, she was awarded the Jackie Eubanks Memorial Award and the Robert B. Downs Intellectual Freedom Award.

=== Opposition to Patriot Act ===
Horn was outspoken in her opposition to the provisions of the Patriot Act concerning library surveillance, and allowing the FBI to obtain a warrant from a secret court for library or bookstore records of anyone connected to an investigation concerning terrorism or spying. Interviewed at age 84 by the San Francisco Chronicle, Horn was asked about the FBI's monitoring of America's libraries. Horn said that her first thought was: "Here we go again." Horn has criticized the law on grounds that it does not require any showing that evidence of wrongdoing is likely to be found or that the target of its investigation is involved in a crime. A librarian could be served with a warrant and must surrender records of the patron's book borrowing or Internet use and is prohibited from revealing the search to anyone — including the patron. Horn has encouraged librarians to protest against the Patriot Act by refusing to comply. She noted: "They have (another) option, the option I took, to say this is not appropriate, this is not ethical in the library profession. It undermines the very essence of what a publicly supported library is."

== Zoia Horn Intellectual Freedom Award ==
The Intellectual Freedom Committee of the California Library Association annually awards the Zoia Horn Intellectual Freedom Award, which "honors Californian people, groups, and organizations that have made significant contributions to intellectual freedom in California." Horn said of the award named in her honor: "I have especially warm feelings toward this honor because the CLA has been very supportive of my efforts."

== Death ==
Horn died on July 12, 2014, at her home in Oakland, California, at the age of 96.

== Works ==
- Horn, Zoia (1995). Zoia! Memoirs of Zoia Horn, battler for people's right to know. McFarland & Co. ISBN 9780786400713 – via Internet Archive.
- Horn, Zoia (May 2002). "The Dismissal of Miss Ruth Brown: Civil Rights, Censorship and the American Library". Journal of Academic Librarianship. Ann Arbor, Michigan.

== See also ==
- Barbara Gittings
- Clara Breed
- Connecticut Four
- Doe v. Gonzales
- Freedom of information
- Intellectual freedom
- Librarianship and human rights in the United States
- List of Brooklyn College alumni
- List of librarians
