= Des Moines Public Library =

Library system in Iowa, U.S.

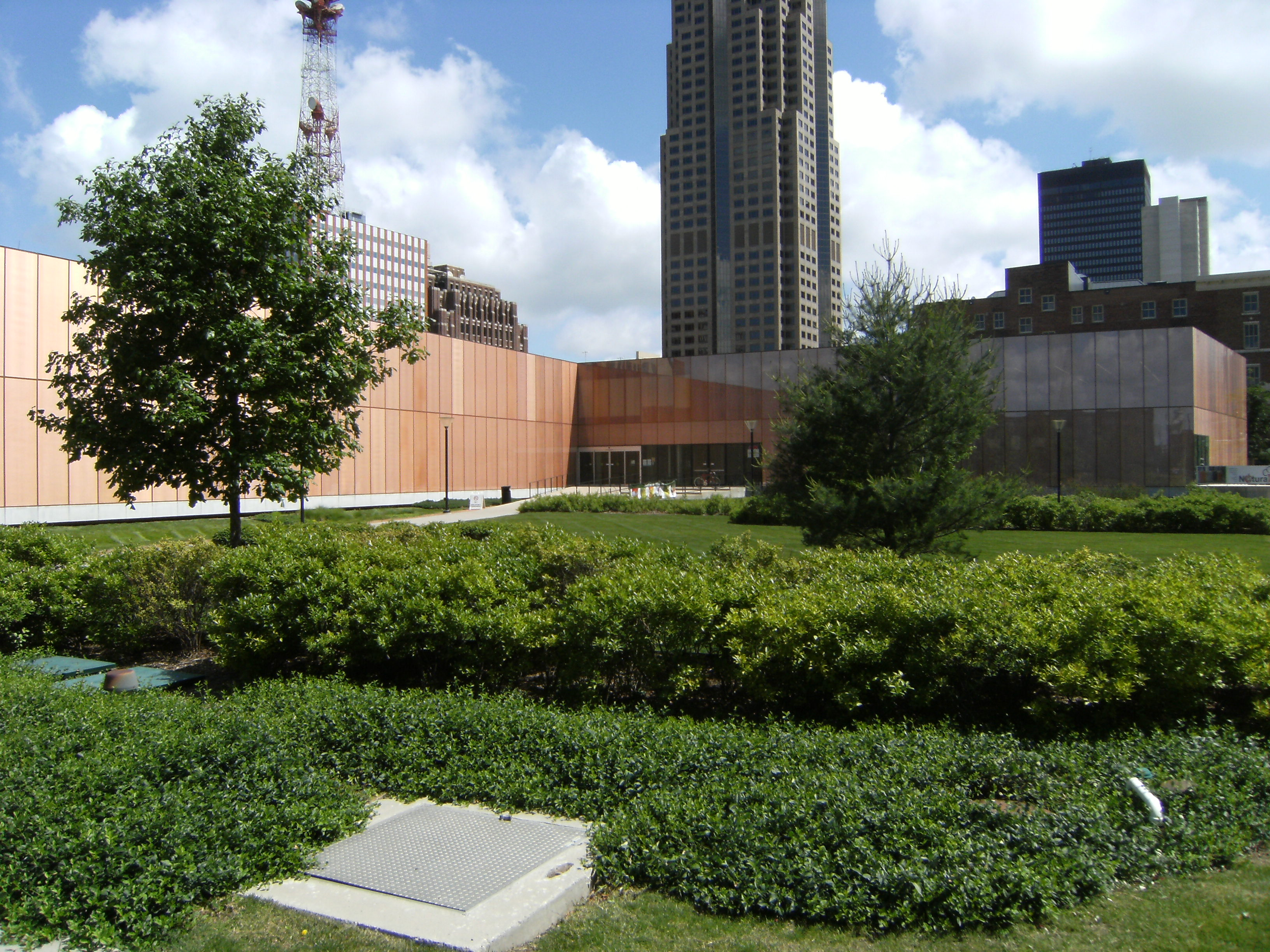
- DMPL Central Library
- 41.5861°N 93.6314°W
- Location: Des Moines, Iowa, United States
- Established: 1866
- Branches: Six

Other information
- Website: dmpl.org

The Des Moines Public Library (DMPL) is the public library system for the city of Des Moines, Iowa, United States. It is the largest public library system in the state of Iowa, with a collection of 552,576 items housed at six locations.

== History ==
The Des Moines Public Library began as the Des Moines Library Association in 1866 in the basement of a Methodist church. Early on, the library was supported by contributions and public charity. It started with nearly 2,300 books and a few periodicals. In 1882, it was decided to turn the library over to the city to become a free public library. The city purchased property at 100 Locust Street for the main library in 1898 for $35,000. The library opened in October 1903, and the Main Library branch remained at 100 Locust Street for more than 100 years.

In 1938, the library became the birthplace of the Library Bill of Rights under director Forrest Spaulding. The bill is still in use today by the American Library Association to ensure diversity of viewpoints in all library materials.

Through the years, the library became a cornerstone for the Des Moines community. In 1937, the Boys and Girls Department opened on the ground floor. During the 1930s, local artist Harry Donald Jones began painting a mural on the ground floor as a Works Progress Administration (WPA) project. The mural, called "The Social History of Des Moines," traced the growth of Des Moines from prehistoric times to present days. In the 1950s, the library developed a music department that featured a large collection of circulating vinyl records, a listening room with piano and record player, and a series of free concerts of recorded music presented weekly in the library's auditorium.

Beginning in the 1960s, the library began consolidating several of the small branches into larger regional branches. This began with the West Side Branch opening in 1965 (later renamed the Franklin Avenue branch). The new East Side Library opened in 1970, and the South Side Library was built in 1977. This was followed by the North Side Library in 1983 and the Forest Avenue Library in 1992. These regional branches helped increase the services available to patrons while remaining neighborhood-based at heart.

In April 2006, a new Central Library opened at 1000 Grand Avenue. The new building was designed by London architect David Chipperfield to serve the library's growing collection and the technology needs of 21st century users. The previous Central Library (located at 100 Locust) is now the home of the World Food Prize.

== Services ==
The library provides research and reference services, as well as Internet computers and wireless Internet access, meeting and study rooms, copy machines and printers, and faxing. In the fall of 2021, the Central Library added Tech Central: Innovation and Maker Lab. Tech Central stations include equipment for video editing, media conversion, laser engraver, sublimation printer, audio and video recording, and more. Another library service is the Community Fridge available at the South Side Library and the Franklin Avenue Library to provide free access to food for community members.

=== Collection ===
The Des Moines Public Library offers books, audio books, e-books, CDs, magazines, newspapers, information databases, and DVDs. Each location features adult, teen and children's fiction and non-fiction collections. The collection expanded to include the "Library of Things" in the fall of 2022. "Library of Things" allows adults with library cards to check out items such as board games, kitchen equipment, home tools, and lawn games for free. The library also has a local history collection at the Central Library; an Iowa Collection that includes books and other items concerning the history and culture of Iowa; the Foundation Center; and The Shoah Visual History Collection.

=== Programs ===
The library presents a variety of informational, educational and fun programs for patrons of all ages. Programs for children and teens include storytimes, crafts, games, and book discussions. To support families and promote early childhood education, the library shares Simple Steps to Success activities and resources. Simple Steps to Success is an early literacy initiative that supports educators and families throughout the community. Adult programming includes book discussions, author visits, lectures, job assistance workshops, and other special events. The library organizes several annual events, including the summer reading program and Authors Visiting in Des Moines (AViD) Author Series.

==== Authors Visiting in Des Moines (AViD) ====
Authors Visiting in Des Moines (AViD) began in 2001 to give the community the chance to listen, learn and laugh as world-famous authors share their stories. With the support of the Des Moines Public Library Foundation and other local donors, including Humanities Iowa, AViD celebrates great reading and writing. Each year features best-selling fiction and nonfiction authors who write about a variety of issues and topics.

== Branches ==
Branch	Address	Notes
Central Library	1000 Grand Avenue	New location in 2006; Houses Special Collections; hosts Art Gallery; designed by noted architect David Chipperfield.
East Side Library	2559 Hubbell Avenue	Renovated in Fall 2006; Features an ocean themed children's area.
Forest Avenue Library	1326 Forest Avenue	Renovated in 2007; Features large foreign language collection and accessibility to language learning software
Franklin Avenue Library	5000 Franklin Avenue	Renovated in 2011; DMPL's first LEED registered building
North Side Library	3516 Fifth Avenue	Renovated in 2007; Features a memorabilia room with a rich local history
South Side Library	1111 Porter Avenue	Renovated in 2007; Features teen loft

== Des Moines Public Library Foundation ==
The Library Foundation of Des Moines was founded in 1998 to support the resources and services of the library through fundraising and advocacy. The Foundation supports programs that benefit the Des Moines community and promote the library's resources. With help from donors, foundations and corporations, the Foundation helps support the Des Moines Public Library.

== See also ==
- Elaine Estes, retired library director
