= Miriam Braverman =

American librarian

Miriam Ruth Gutman Braverman (1920–2002) was an American librarian. She attended library school at Pratt Institute. She was part of the socialist movement in the 1940s and 1950s. In the 1960s she set up libraries in Freedom Schools in Mississippi, and she worked at the Brooklyn Public Library beginning in 1964.

During the 1964's Freedom Summer, she campaigned through Mississippi with the Friends of Freedom Libraries. She documented her experiences of the campaign in an article titled “Mississippi Summer” in November 1965 for the School Library Journal.

She was also one of the founders of the American Library Association's Social Responsibilities Round Table, which was founded in 1969. She wrote a history of young adult services at three public libraries, titled Youth, Society and the Public Library (1979). She was a leader in the fight which led to the American Library Association condemning the Vietnam War. She taught at the School of Library Services of Columbia University (from which she earned her doctorate) until 1982. In 1982 she conducted a study which led to the creation of the Langston Hughes Library and Cultural Center in Queens. She was a member of the Progressive Librarians Guild, and joined their Coordinating Committee during the last year she was alive.

The Miriam Braverman Memorial Prize is named after her.

On Friday, December 8, 2006 Major Owens of New York praised her on the floor of the U.S. House of Representatives. Owens referred to her as a "Great Point-of-Light for all Americans…a great humanitarian as well as a Librarian…, who understood that the power of information was continually escalating… as an advocate in the classroom and a fighter on the street."

== Bibliography ==
- Teenage reading and the public library (1963)
- Public library and the young adult : the development of the service and its philosophy in the New York Public Library, Cleveland Public Library, and Enoch Pratt Free Library (1974)
- Young adults : not too distant, not too dim (1976)
- Youth, society, and the public library (1978)
- Langston Hughes, from experiment to institution : final report (1982)
- The Classical shape : decorated pottery of the ancient world (1984)
- Mississippi Summer (1965)
