= Old Downtown Des Moines Library =

Historic building in downtown Des Moines, Iowa

- U.S. National Register of Historic Places
- U.S. Historic district – Contributing property
- The Old Downtown Des Moines Library at golden hour

- Location within Iowa Location within the United States
- Location: 100 Locust Street, Des Moines, Iowa
- Coordinates: 41°35′15.5″N 93°37′8.1″W
- Built: 1903
- Architect: Gutterson & Smith
- Architectural style: Beaux Arts
- Part of: Civic Center Historic District (ID88001168)
- NRHP reference No.: 77000550
- Added to NRHP: July 25, 1977

The Old Downtown Des Moines Library is a historic building in downtown Des Moines, Iowa, United States that was built in 1903. It was individually listed on the National Register of Historic Places in 1977, and became a contributing property in the Civic Center Historic District in 1988. The building ceased to be a library in 2006; it currently houses the Norman E. Borlaug | World Food Prize Hall of Laureates for the World Food Prize.

== History ==
The Des Moines Library Association was formed in 1866 in the basement of a Methodist church. It was supported through private contributions and public charity until 1882 when its services were taken over by the city of Des Moines because of precarious finances. In 1898, the city bought property on the Des Moines River for $35,000. The cornerstone for the library building was laid in 1900 and it was opened in October 1903.

In the 1920s, the library became the home of the Cumming School of Art. It was the birthplace of the Library Bill of Rights in 1938 when the library was under the direction of Forrest Spaulding. It was meant to fight against "growing intolerance, suppression of free speech and censorship affecting the rights of minorities and individuals." The Boys and Girls Department opened in 1937 and the Music Department began in the 1950s.

In the 1990s, it was determined that the library building was too small and lacked the necessary technology capacity. London architect David Chipperfield was chosen to design a new library on Grand Avenue, and it opened on April 8, 2006.

The building was acquired by The World Food Prize for its use. The building was renamed in honor of Cresco, Iowa native Norman Borlaug, who founded the award which recognizes those who have made contributions in all fields involved in the world food supply. Gensler Architecture, Design and Planning, RDG Planning & Design and Hoerr Schaudt Landscape Architecture are involved in renovating the building. It will serve as a museum to recognize great achievements in agriculture, a convocation center that will hold the World Food Prize International Symposium, a home for the Global Youth Institute, an educational facility that will feature interactive displays on hunger and food security and a conference center and community hall.

== Architecture ==
Des Moines architects Gutterson & Smith designed the Beaux Arts style building. It was constructed of salmon pink, Minnesota limestone. A mural was painted on the ground floor of the library by Des Moines artist, Harry Donald Jones. It was a project of the Works Progress Administration. The mural covers 1,091 square feet (101.4 m^{2}) and portrays the development of Des Moines from pre-historic times to the 20th century. The building originally featured a fountain and stone steps, which were removed in 1955.
