= Elaine Estes =

American librarian (born 1931)

Elaine Rose Graham Estes (born November 24, 1931) is an American retired librarian who was the Des Moines Public Library director and the first African American to have that title. Her attempt to live in the then-unintegrated Drake University dormitories led to her and two others being credited for integrating the dormitories. Estes received multiple honors, including a Distinguished Alumni Award and appearing in a documentary.

== Early life ==
Estes was born in Springfield, Missouri to James and Zelma Graham. Her parents owned Graham's Rib Station in Springfield and Estes worked there as a child. They were able to operate the business throughout the Great Depression due to withdrawing their savings shortly before the stock market crash. The business was near Route 66 and served everyone, including World War II soldiers, entertainers from the Shrine Mosque, and people who lived in the same neighborhood. Graham's Rib Station was known for her parents' barbecue sauce.

When Estes was deciding between attending Drake University or Sarah Lawrence College, she visited Drake University in 1949. The dean of women told her that the university's housing was not integrated. Due to Iowa laws, Estes' parents initially thought that "Des Moines would be more of an open opportunity for people of color". After the board of trustees ruled in favor of racial integration, she moved into the women's dormitory during the fall. Estes has been credited with integrating the university's dormitories alongside Johnnie Lockett and Hetercene Turner. She graduated in 1953 and attended Drake University in 1956 for a teaching degree.

== Career ==
Estes worked at Younkers and was later hired by the Des Moines Public Library, where she worked for 39 years ending her library career by serving as library director. She was the first African American director for the Public Library of Des Moines and she was the first woman to have that role in 50 years. Estes was instrumental in beginning the restoration of the Main Library building which later became the World Food Prize building. When she was the library director, the library was the first in the United States to start a materials preservation program and her lobbying efforts passed a law protecting the privacy of a library user's record. She retired in 1995.

== Honors ==
Estes won the Distinguished Alumni Award from Drake University in 1979 and was the first woman inductee of the Des Moines Rotary Club. DSM Magazine named her as one of the sages over 70 in November 2016. On June 23, 2010, Estes was inducted into the Iowa African-American Hall of Fame. In 2019, she appeared in the Iowa Public Television documentary Tradition and Valor: The Story Continues.
