= Progressive Librarians Guild =

Librarian organization

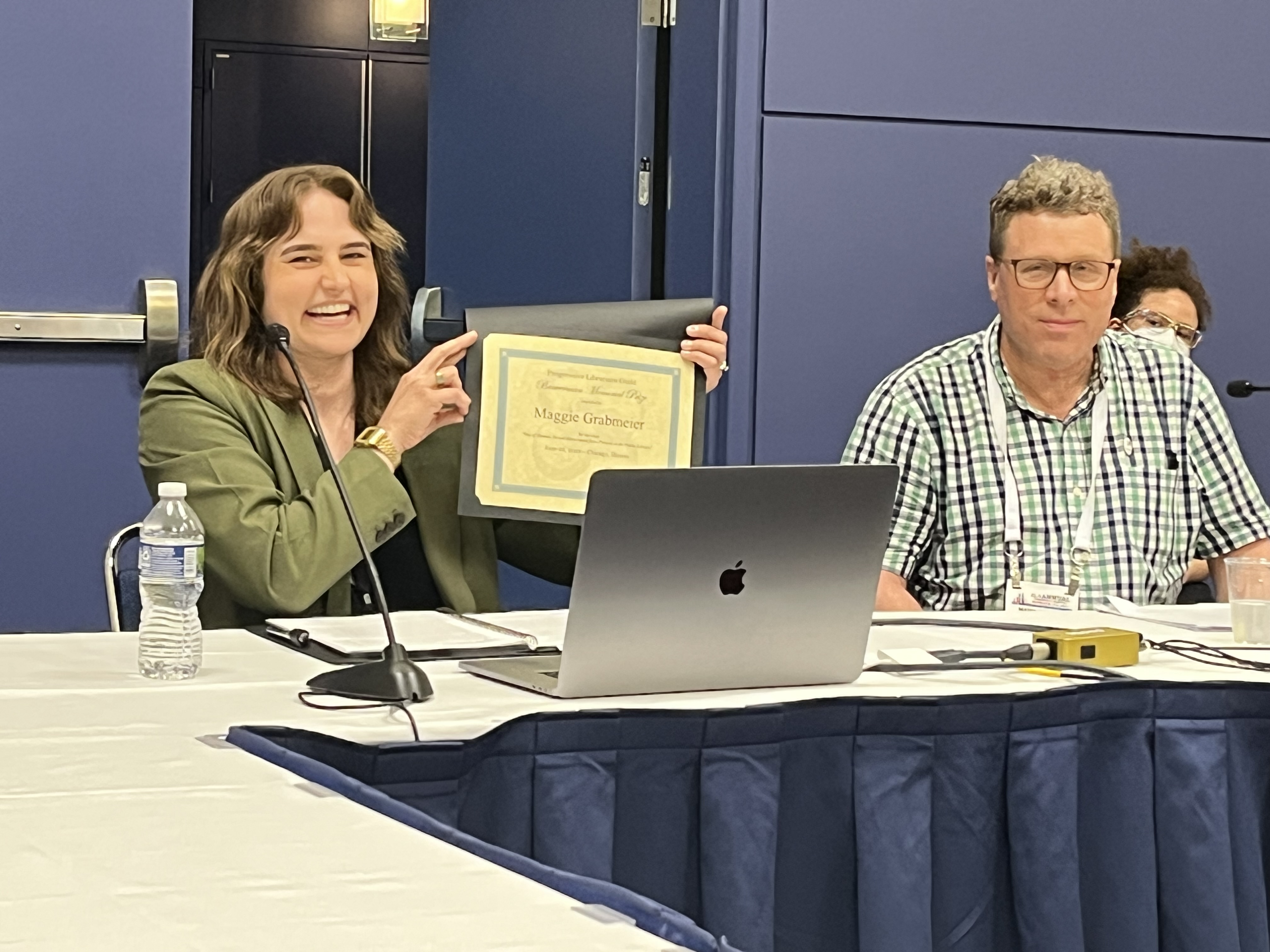
The Braverman Prize honors Miriam Ruth Gutman Braverman (1920-2002), who was a socialist, writer, activist librarian, longstanding member of the Progressive Librarians Guild (PLG), and a founder of ALA's Social Responsibilities Round Table (SRRT).

The Progressive Librarians Guild (PLG) was founded in New York City in January 1990 by librarians concerned with the library profession's "rapid drift into dubious alliances with business and the information industry, and into complacent acceptance of service to an unquestioned political, economic and cultural status quo," according to the organization's statement of purpose. The initial three organizers were Elaine Harger, Mark Rosenzweig and Elliot Shore. The PLG addresses issues especially relating to librarianship and human rights.

== Progressive Librarian ==
Progressive Librarian
- Language: English

Publication details
- Publisher: Progressive Librarians Guild
- Frequency: Biannual

Standard abbreviations
- ISO 4: Progress. Libr.

Indexing
- ISSN: 1052-5726

The Progressive Librarians Guild publishes the journal The Progressive Librarian, a forum for critical perspectives in librarianship and information studies. The journal features articles, book reviews, bibliographies, reports, and documents. The first issue of Progressive Librarian was published in the summer of 1990 on the heels of the founding of PLG and was given its title by Sanford Berman, who exclaimed that the journal of PLG could have no other title than Progressive Librarian (the subtitle, A Journal of Critical Studies and Progressive Politics in Librarianship, came later in 1998 with issue #14). The first issue was to be a contribution to the debate taking place within the American Library Association (ALA) in which the upper ranks of power in ALA were attempting to overturn the association's official support of the cultural boycott against apartheid institutions in South Africa. An index for 1990-1999 was published in 2007. Elaine Harger was managing editor during the journal's years of publication.

== Miriam Braverman Memorial Prize ==
The Guild annually bestows the Miriam Braverman Memorial Prize to library and information science students attending a graduate level program in the United States or Canada who submit a paper based on an aspect of the social responsibilities of librarians, libraries, or librarianship. Papers related to archivists, archives, and archival work are also eligible.

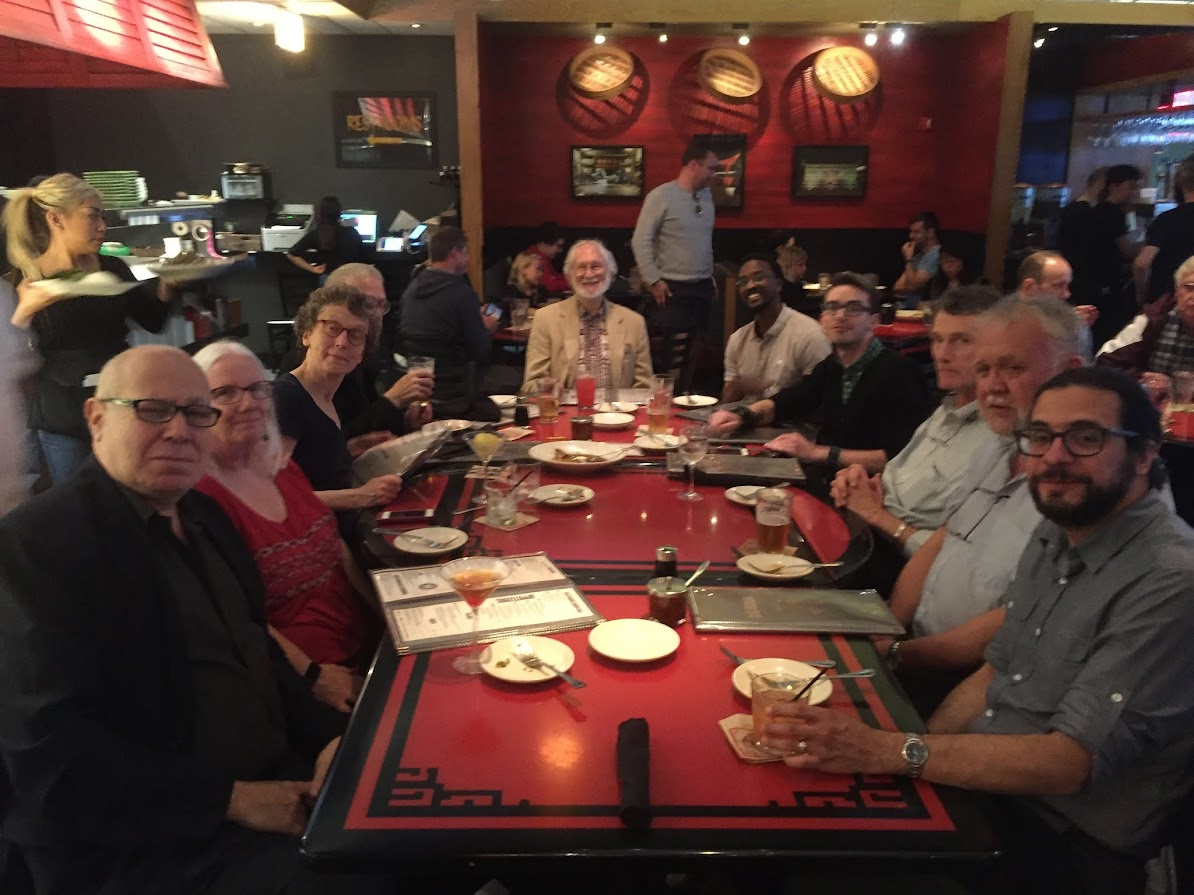
Miriam Braverman Memorial Prize dinner 2017

== Union Library Workers and Labor Compilations ==
The Guild produced the Union Library Workers blog from 2002-2023. and published an annual review about librarians and labor in its journal, Progressive Librarian from 2006-2021.

The Progressive Librarian article, "Collective Bargaining is a Human Right," summarized librarian involvement in 2011 public sector union protests to defend collective bargaining in Wisconsin. Progressive Librarian featured annual reviews of librarian labor activities.

In 2023 the final PLG annual compilation of unions actions from 2021-Labor Day 2023 was published in the SRRT Newsletter as "Unions- 2002-2023- Bibliographic history of the Union Library Workers project by the Progressive Librarians Guild." In 2023 with support from American Library Association president, Emily Drabinski, the Union Library Workers blog was moved to the ALA-Allied Professional Association, a nonprofit organization established “to promote the mutual professional interests of librarians and other library workers.”

== PLG Discussion List ==
The Guild sponsors a discussion list, PLGnet.

== Statements and resolutions ==
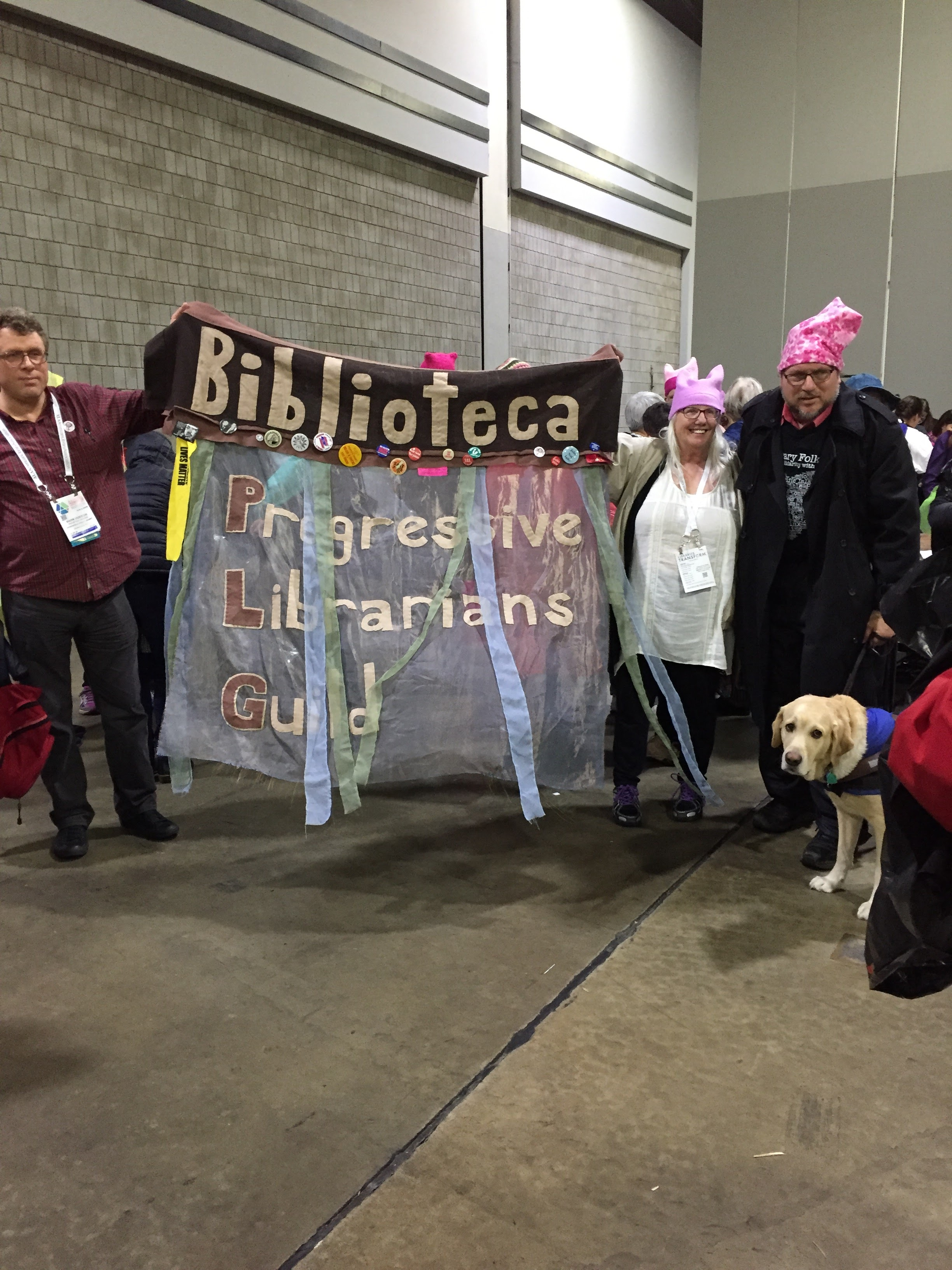
Progressive Librarian Guild members preparing to march at the Atlanta Women's march on 1/21/2017. During Midwinter meeting of the American Library Association.

The Guild has issued statements and resolutions such as:

- "PLG Resolution on Divestment of Holdings in Fossil Fuel Companies and Libraries’ Role in a Peaceful Transition to a Fossil-Fuel-Free Economy." June 30, 2013.
- "Statement on Censorship and the Tucson Unified School District." January 21, 2012.
- "On Wikileaks and the Library of Congress: A Statement by the Progressive Librarians Guild." (2010).
- "Calls for Elsevier to End Corrupt Publishing Practices and for Library Associations to Take Advocacy Role on Behalf of Scientific Integrity." (2009)
- "Endorsed the Iraq Moratorium." (2007)
- "Resolution Against Anti-Immigrant Legislation." (2006).

== Joint Conference of Librarians of Color ==
The Progressive Librarians Guild was represented at the 2006 Joint Conference of Librarians of Color (JCLC) with a panel on Librarians and Social Movements. For the 2012 JCLC the Progressive Librarian #38/39 included a feature on the conference and the five caucus associations of color.

== United States Social Forum 2007 ==
In 2007 members of the Progressive Librarians Guild participated in the United States Social Forum (USSF) in Atlanta. In homage to the USSF's statement on language accessibility, PLG's new banner read "Library" on one side and "Biblioteca" on the other for the Opening March that launched the first ever regional social forum in the United States. The Librarians program was held at the Auburn Avenue Research Library, the second largest collection of African-American materials in the U.S., located on the very street that is home to the Ebenezer Baptist Church and the gravesites of Martin Luther King Jr. and Mrs. Coretta Scott King. PLG members collected materials from the USSF for the Labadie Collection at the University of Michigan.

== Chapters ==
As of May 2017, the Progressive Librarians Guild has three active chapters:

- London (Ontario) PLG Chapter
- St. Kate's PLG Chapter (the College of St. Catherine)
- Toronto PLG Chapter

The following chapters are no longer active:

- Dalhousie University PLG Chapter
- Drexel PLG Chapter
- Emporia State University PLG Chapter
- Indiana University PLG Chapter
- Piedmont (SC) PLG Chapter
- Vancouver PLG Chapter
- SILS PLG Chapter
- St. John's University PLG Chapter
- Simmons GSLIS PLG Chapter
- University of Arizona PLG Chapter
- University of Illinois at Urbana-Champaign PLG Chapter
- University of Missouri PLG Chapter
- Wayne State University (Detroit) PLG Chapter

== See also ==
- List of libraries in the United States
