= Forrest Spaulding =

American librarian

- Forrest Spaulding
- Born: Forrest Brisbin Spaulding; May 4, 1892; Nashua, New Hampshire
- Died: December 9, 1965 (aged 73); Concord, New Hampshire
- Occupation: Librarian
- Spouse: Genevieve Anderson Pierson
- Children: John Pierson Spaulding, Jean Spaulding Wilder
- Parent(s): Hollon Curtis Spaulding and Lucile Brisbin

Forrest Brisbin Spaulding (May 4, 1892 – December 9, 1965) was an American librarian. He was named in the American Libraries article, "100 of the most important leaders we had in the 20th century" for his contribution to intellectual freedom in writing the Library Bill of Rights. He was a humanitarian who is remembered not only for his contributions to librarianship, but also for the positive influence he had on the communities in which he lived and worked. In a commentary on the play The Not So Quiet Librarian, by Cynthia Mercati, Humanities Iowa writes that "Spaulding's words and his life touched everyone who loved not just books but freedom of expression." While Forrest Spaulding is remembered for his contributions to librarianship, he began his career as a reporter. The State Library of Iowa biography mentions that while he spent some time as director of Peru's libraries and museums in 1920, "he was also a correspondent for the Associated Press. He is noted as saying that his 'efforts to report the news from that country gave him a bitter object lesson in censorship.'"

== Library Outreach ==
Spaulding believed in library outreach and frequently organized traveling libraries, often for military groups. During 1916, he worked with the YMCA to create collections to send to soldiers on the Mexican border and while these collections were small in number, Spaulding strove to ensure they were broad in topic and felt the items would all return well-used. He served as director for the Des Moines Public Library from 1917-1919 when he left to pursue other interests, among them the library & museum project in Peru. He then returned to serve as the Director of the Des Moines Library from 1927-1952. He created what became known as "the waterfront university" in the basement of the Des Moines Library for unemployed men and others that were struggling during the Depression. He was an early adopter of new technology regarding library outreach and he put library programs on the air via WHO radio in 1928. At the heart of Spaulding's convictions regarding human rights and concerns about the threat of censorship was a belief in the power of the written word and an understanding that all people needed to have free and equal access to information.

== Library Bill of Rights ==
In 1938, as concerns regarding censorship mounted, Spaulding wrote a library bill of rights. He presented it before the Des Moines Public Library board and it was passed by the board as a proclamation that they would not give in to pressures to censor items from their collection. In the State Library of Iowa's biography Forrest Spaulding it is noted that in 1940 he was challenged regarding his library's copy of Hitler's Mein Kampf. "Spaulding responded by saying that, 'if more people had read Mein Kampf, some of Hitler's despotism might have been prevented.' He maintained that the danger to the United States was not in knowing all about Hitler, but in not knowing all about him. He said 'we should fear the tendency of small minds in these days of stress.'" Spaulding's library bill was later adopted by the American Library Association and remains a strong influence to librarianship today. While the Library Bill of Rights was amended several times by the ALA to account for new media and concerns related to age, the original intent remains, which is, to protect people's right to access information and to use the library.

== Advocacy for Access to Information ==
In the article, The Librarian's Commitment to the Bill of Rights, Berninghausen points out that prior to 1939, censorship did not appear to be a concern for most librarians. He found that "very few pieces on censorship in libraries appeared in the index to Library Literature before that time. Some of those few articles actually supported censorship." Louise Robbins also mentions in Censorship and the American Library that there was a lack of initial awareness and support stating that only "7% thought threats to the bill of rights were the most vital problem in libraries today." The bill was a focal point for controversy as was the ALA for adopting it. In putting his convictions into writing and bringing them before the ALA for endorsement, Forrest Spaulding took a stand regarding his convictions in an age when it was, in many ways, personally and politically risky to do so. As Dean Shaloup says in his article, Do you know Forrest Spaulding? "this is even more admirable when you consider it was World War II-era America, when anyone promoting anything other than apple pie, baseball, target shooting and flag waving were thought of as un-American."

== Looking Back, Moving Ahead ==
Ann Symons, speaker and former librarian, mentions in a reflective essay on librarianship that she is grateful for his efforts not only for the profession but also as a library patron and notes that "Forrest Spaulding's library was not the library any of us work in today." Our society continues to struggle with questions regarding obscenity and controversial ideas. Librarians continue to receive pressure to remove and label items in their collection. Librarians are still occasionally persecuted for standing strong in their convictions to protect the right to read. The ALA's Economic Barriers to Freedom: an interpretation of the Library Bill of Rights begins by stating "a democracy presupposes an informed citizenry." Being able to fully explore all sides of an issue is imperative to forming an educated opinion regarding the issue. In advocating for intellectual freedom in the creation of his bill of rights, Forrest Spaulding gave librarians a platform on which to stand as they work to protect every person’s right to access information.
