= Miriam Braverman Memorial Prize =

The Miriam Braverman Memorial Prize, named after librarian Miriam Braverman, is sponsored by the Progressive Librarians Guild (PLG).

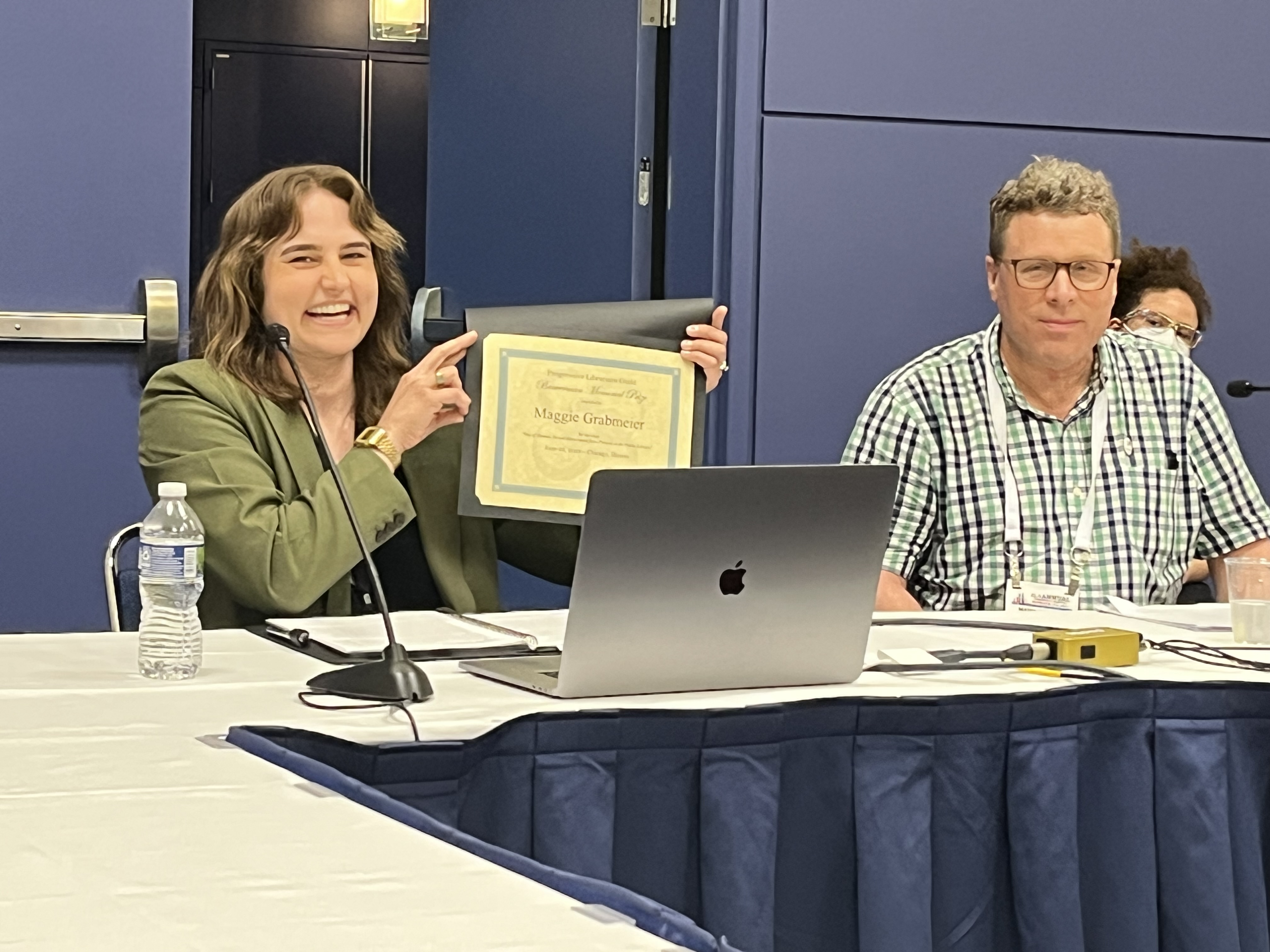
PLG Braverman Award Winner, Maggie Grabmeier, with PLG Award Coordinator, Mark Hudson 2023

The intent of the award is "to celebrate Miriam's spirit of activism and faith in the power of people's collective social justice efforts and inspire future generations of librarians." The Prize is awarded each year for the best graduate student paper about some aspect of the social responsibilities of librarians, libraries, or librarianship. Papers related to archivists, archives, and archival work are also eligible.

Every winning paper is published in the Progressive Librarian journal.

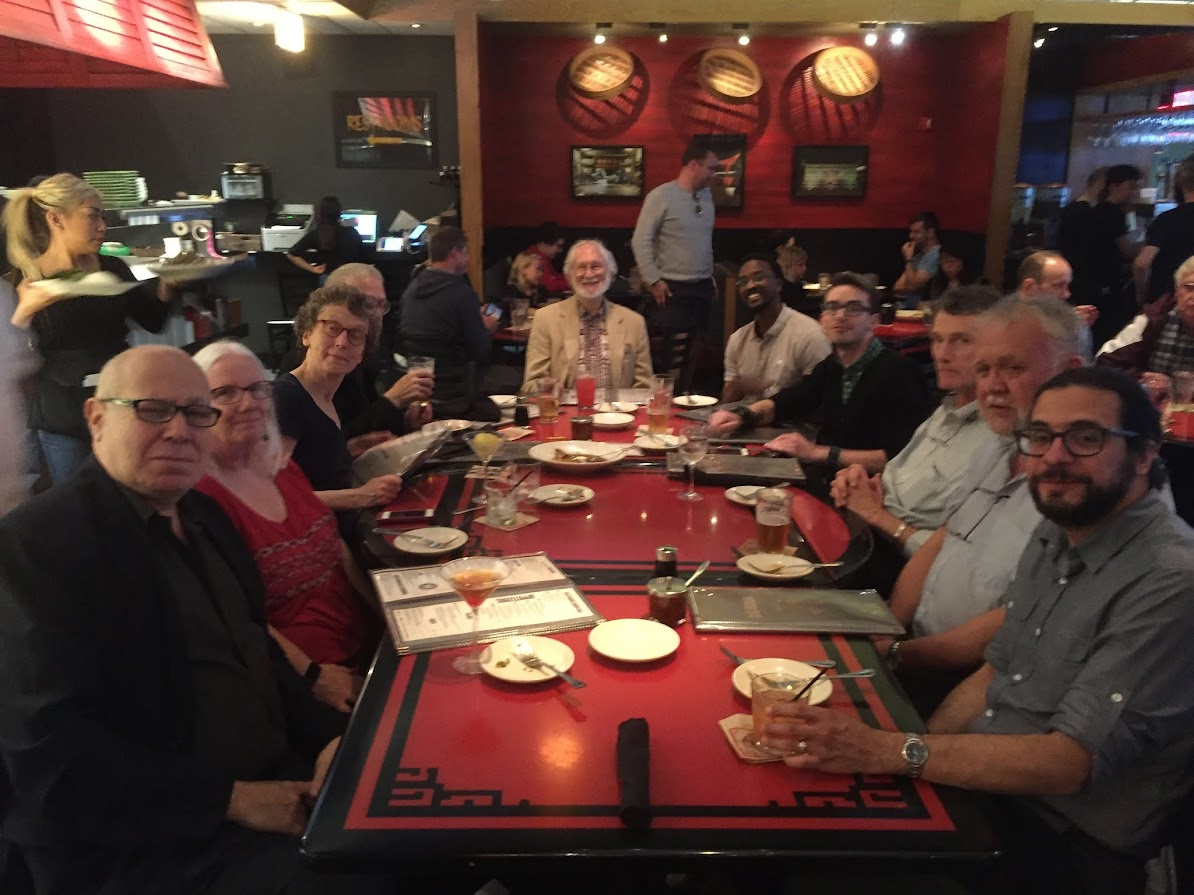
Miriam Braverman Memorial Prize dinner 2017

Miriam Braverman Memorial Prize Winner	Date	Title	University
Maggie Grabmeier	2023	"Out of Bounds: Sexual Harassment from Patrons in the Public Library"	University of Wisconsin-Madison
Daniel Clarkson Fisher	2022	"A Promised (but Ultimately Unreachable) Land: the Fallacy of "Political Neutrality" Exemplified by Fmr. U.S. President Barack Obama's Appearance at the 2021 ALA Annual Conference & Exhibition."	University of Western Ontario.
Eli Holliday	2021	"Death to the Professional: Re-envisioning Labour in the Public Library"	University of Toronto
Ashley Huot	2021	"Prison Zines: Relations, Communication, and Records."	University of Alberta
2020. Competition cancelled due to COVID-19.			
Yoonhee Lee	2019	"Towards universal access to knowledge: the invisible labor of digitizing."	University of Toronto
Alessandra Seiter	2018	“Libraries, Power, and Justice: Toward a Sociohistorically Informed Intellectual Freedom.”	Simmons College
Matthew Weirick Johnson	2017	“Personal Health Data, Surveillance, & Biopolitics: Toward a Personal Health Data Information Literacy.”	University of North Carolina at Chapel Hill.
Sarah Kortemeier	2016	“I'll Drown My Book: Visibility, Gender, and Classification in The University of Arizona Poetry Center Library.”	University of Arizona
Kyle Shockey	2015	“Intellectual Freedom Is Not Social Justice: The Symbolic Capital of Intellectual Freedom in ALA Accreditation and LIS Curricula.”	Indiana University
Denise Scott	2014	“Deconstructing the ‘Books for Boys’ Discourse.”	University of Toronto
Emily Lawrence	2013	“Loud Hands in the Library: Neurodiversity in LIS Theory & Practice."	iSchool at University of Maryland - College Park
Sara Zettervall	2012	“Through a Distant Lens: Visions of Native Hawaiians in Children’s Picture Books."	St. Catherine University
Tiffany Chow	2011	"Design Implications: How Space Can Transform the Library and Its Public."	University of Michigan
Kristen Hogan	2010	"'Breaking Secrets' in the Catalog: Proposing the Black Queer Studies Collection at the University of Texas at Austin."	University of Texas, Austin
Sarah Clark	2009	“Marketing the Library? Why Librarians Should Focus on Stewardship and Advocacy.”	University of California, Los Angeles
Miriam Rigby	2008	"JUST THROW IT ALL AWAY! (and other thoughts I have had that may bar me from a career in archiving)."	University of Washington.
Marcel A. Q. LaFlamme	2007	"Towards a Progressive Discourse on Community Needs Assessment: perspectives from collaborative ethnography and action research."	Simmons College
Joseph Deodato	2006	"Becoming Responsible Mediators: The Application of Postmodern Perspectives to Archival Arrangement and Description.”	University of Maryland
Jennifer Downey	2005	Public Library Collection Development Issues Regarding the Information Needs of Gay, Lesbian, Bisexual, and Transgender Patrons."	San Jose State University
No Award			
Michelle Sipley	2003	"Operation Patriot Act: The Role of School Libraries in Promoting a Free and Informed Society."	Syracuse University
