= Ruth Brown (librarian) =

American librarian (1891–1975)

- Born: July 26, 1891; Hiawatha, Kansas, United States
- Died: September 10, 1975 (aged 84); Collinsville, Oklahoma, United States
- Education: University of Oklahoma
- Occupation: Librarian

Ruth Winifred Brown (July 26, 1891 – September 10, 1975) was an American librarian, best known for her dismissal from service for civil rights activities in the late 1940s. On July 25, 1950, she was dismissed after 30 years of service as the Bartlesville, Oklahoma public librarian. She was relieved of her duties in 1950 on the accusation that she was a communist because of her desegregation activities. She was accused of providing subversive materials to the public and indoctrinating children against the United States; however, it was widely believed at the time that her dismissal was in response to her activities promoting the equality of African-Americans.

== Life ==
Brown was born in Hiawatha, Kansas on July 26, 1891, to Silas and Jennie Brown, who were both from New England. She lived with her parents and brother Merrit in Kansas until the family moved to California. Brown attended high school in California and then went to Northwestern State Normal School in Alva, Oklahoma. Graduating in 1910, Brown then attended the University of Oklahoma, graduating in 1915. Brown also attended the Columbia University School of Library Service during summers, where she worked with Helen E. Haines and Ernestine Rose. Brown taught in Eufaula and Nowata but chose not to continue teaching. Instead, she moved to the small town of Bartlesville in 1919, where her parents then lived. In November 1919, Brown accepted a librarian position at the local Carnegie library in Bartlesville. She knew all the children who visited the library by name and even persuaded some to become librarians.

Active in the Oklahoma Library Association, Brown was elected secretary in 1920, treasurer in 1926, and president in 1931. During her presidential year, she gave a speech which advised librarians to "reduce to a minimum worry about lost books" and to encourage the many who did not "make use of their right to library service." She stated that libraries should provide "recreational culture suited to all needs" of the community they served, which was a forward-thinking idea for libraries at that time. Brown believed that the library should be both a repository for information and a source for recreation.

Brown was a library advocate during the Great Depression and provided materials for the unemployed men in the community and their families. She documented how her materials were used, sometimes in great detail. She was also a strong believer in the principle of "equity of access" and was committed to racial equality in the public library.

== Activities leading to dismissal ==
The original Bartlesville Public Library where Ruth Brown worked.

In 1946, Brown helped established the Committee on the Practice of Democracy (COPD) in Bartlesville. The COPD worked to improve "relations among people of all race [and] to foster improvement of conditions arising out of discrimination based on race, creed, or color." Later the same year, the Bartlesville chapter of COPD affiliated with the Congress of Racial Equality (CORE), becoming the only chapter of CORE below the Mason–Dixon line. The group recruited an African-American doctor to live and work in the black community of Bartlesville. They, together with the YWCA, sponsored interracial conferences and seminars.

In 1939, only 99 of the 774 Southern public libraries provided services for African American patrons. In the Bartlesville Public Library, Brown had been providing service to African Americans since the 1920s. By 1950, the library subscribed to Ebony and Negro Digest. Brown was also interested in integrating the children's storytime but was dissuaded from doing so by the library commission. She then turned her attention to an educational exhibit on "Negro Culture from Africa to Today". Brown upset some in the community when she took two female African-American teachers to a local diner in downtown Bartlesville. The diner refused to serve them and Brown and her companions staged a sit-in. She took African-American friends with her to church and promoted a lecture by Bayard Rustin, an African-American Quaker pacifist. The leaders of the community then began to work to remove Brown.

The battle between the American Legion and Brown over materials in the Bartlesville Public Library used McCarthyist tactics to counter racial integration. A citizens' committee was formed to work towards her dismissal. Brown could not be fired because of her political views and civil rights activities as they all took place outside of work; Instead, the citizen's group against Brown attacked her for having supposedly subversive materials in the library. The library board was asked by the city commission to perform a complete examination of the library's collection and of Brown's operations. The library board reported that they could not find any evidence of subversive materials or teachings.

On March 9, 1950, the Bartlesville Examiner-Enterprise published a picture of the materials in question, including copies of The Nation and The New Republic (to which the library had subscribed for years) and the book The Russians: The Land, the People and Why They Fight, pictured without its dust jacket or any library markings. There was never any admission by the paper of where this picture was taken; it had not been authorized by the library board and the books on top could not be located. During this battle, Brown is nationally recognized as the first librarian to receive assistance from the Intellectual Freedom Committee of the American Library Association.

On July 10, the city commission dismissed the entire library board. A new board was immediately appointed which supported the city's position regarding Brown. Brown was interviewed by the city commission on July 25, 1950. She refused to answer questions about her private life except in writing at her attorney's request. When asked about the subversive materials in the library, she responded that they were three of seventy-five publications to which she subscribed. She continued that she did not feel she should censor what the public chose to read and that she had subscribed to them for over 15 years. In spite of no clear evidence of subversion, she was fired the same day.

Though the Bartlesville commission's public position was that Brown was fired for insubordination, to the public it appeared she had been fired for trying to protect the library's position on intellectual freedom and free speech. A group of supporters calling themselves the Friends of Miss Brown tried to pursue her cause in court but were unsuccessful due to a lack of constitutional standing. The Oklahoma Library Association as well as the ALA and the American Civil Liberties Union all protested the attack on intellectual freedom and Bartlesville continued to be scrutinized on a national level.

On March 11, 2007, a bronze bust of Brown was unveiled at the Bartlesville Library and a library scholarship fund was established in her honor.

== Personal life ==
Brown attempted to adopt a pair of orphaned sisters, but the welfare agency was unwilling to place them with Brown because she was unmarried. The elder, Mildred "Holly" Holliday, ran away from her abusive foster parents when she was eighteen and went to live with Brown. Holly's sister Ellen then also ran away to live with Brown, who was finally able to adopt the younger girl.

After her retirement, Brown moved to Cincinnati, Ohio, staying in an apartment adjacent to Holly's residence. Due to her failing health, Brown eventually moved in with Ellen's family in Collinsville, Oklahoma. On September 10, 1975, Brown died at the age of 84 from complications of a stroke. At her request, her body was donated to the University of Oklahoma Medical Center.

== Popular culture ==
The events depicted in the 1956 film Storm Center were largely fictional, but the character played by Bette Davis was based on Ruth Brown and her struggle with the county commission over communist literature.
