= Elaine Harger =

American librarian (born 1956)

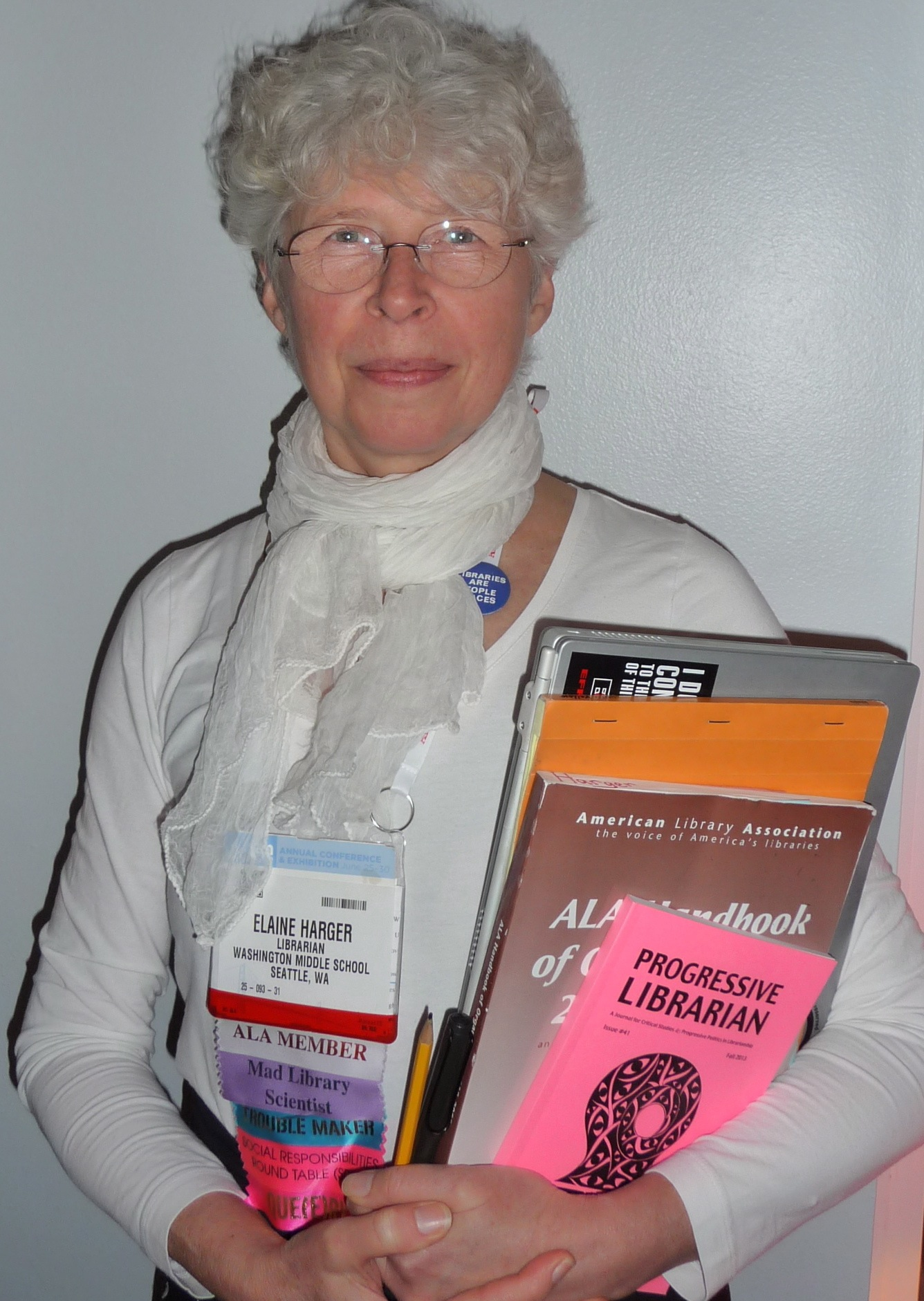
- Elaine at an American Library Association conference
- Born: February 16, 1956 (age 70)
- Education: Columbia University (MLS)
- Occupation: Librarian

Elaine Harger is an American librarian. She was the first recipient of the Herb Biblo Outstanding Leadership Award for Social Justice and Equality in 2022.

Harger is the co-founder (with Mark Rosenzweig and Elliot Shore) of the Progressive Librarians Guild organized in 1989, and was on the editorial committee of their publication, Progressive Librarian. She was managing editor for all 47 issues. She wrote many editorial and articles for the journal including "Why PLG? Why paper? Why bridge generations?" and "Conscience v. Political Expediency at ALA."

In the early 1990s she co-wrote a column Talkin' Union with Mark Rosenzweig for Library Journal. She has been a member of the American Library Association and the Social Responsibilities Round Table of ALA for 35 years. She served on ALA Council as an elected at-large member and served as co-chair of the ALA/AFL-CIO Joint Committee on Library Services to Labor Groups. She is the author of the book Which Side Are You On? Seven Social Responsibility Debates in American Librarianship, 1990-2015.

Harger received her MLS from Columbia University School of Library Service in 1988, and her first professional librarian job was at the Harry Van Arsdale, Jr. School of Labor Studies, a branch of Empire State College in New York City where she was also the union representative to the United University Professions-American Federation of Teachers from 1989 to 1995.

While there she co-authored the Bibliography of the Works of Philip Sheldon Foner. She also worked as head librarian at the New Jersey Historical Society and then shifted into public education as a school librarian. She was responsible for the opening of a library at PS/IS 176, the W. Haywood Burns School in New York City.

After a move to the West Coast, she became a librarian at Mount Si High School in Snoqualmie, Washington, Meadowdale Elementary in Lynnwood, Washington, and Washington Middle School in Seattle, Washington. She is now retired and living in Spokane, Washington.

Her recent publications include “The Bibliography: A Story,” in Phillip S.Foner: Marxist Historian and “Social Class, Solidarity & Librarianship: Reckoning with Our Own Culpability in Reproducing Systems of Injustice.”

Harger was born to Richard Harger and Lois Marie Ensign, one of five children.
