= Clara Breed =

American librarian

Clara Estelle Breed
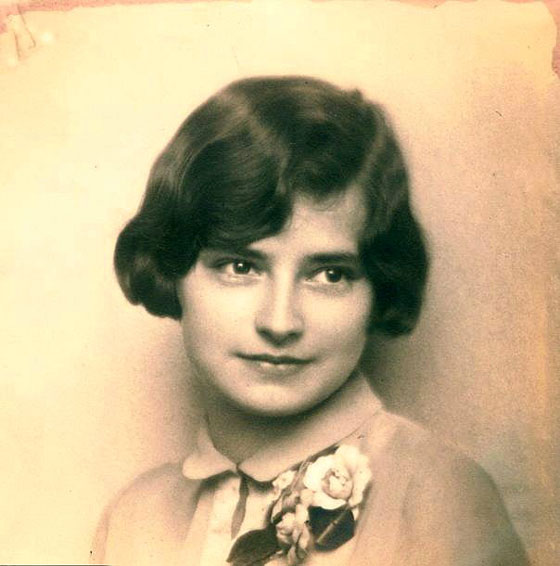
- Clara Breed in the 1920s
- Born: March 19, 1906; Fort Dodge, Iowa, US
- Died: September 8, 1994 (aged 88); Spring Valley, California, US
- Education: Pomona College
- Occupation: Librarian
- Known for: Support of Japanese American children during World War II

Clara Estelle Breed (March 19, 1906 – September 8, 1994) was an American librarian remembered chiefly for her support for Japanese American children during World War II. After the attack on Pearl Harbor on December 7, 1941, many residents of California who were of Japanese descent were moved to remote Japanese American internment camps where they stayed until the end of the war. Breed kept in communication with many of the children who were sent to the camps, sending reading materials and visiting them regularly.

She worked for the San Diego Public Library system for more than 40 years, including 25 years as city librarian.

== Early life and education ==
Clara Breed was born in Fort Dodge, Iowa, in 1906. Her parents were Estelle Marie Potter and Reuben Leonard Breed, a Congregational minister. The family lived in New York and Illinois, before moving to San Diego in 1920 following the death of Reuben Breed. A 1923 graduate of San Diego High School and a 1927 graduate of Pomona College, Breed received her master's degree in library science from Western Reserve University.

== Career ==
In 1928 Breed started work as the children's librarian in the East San Diego branch library. In 1945 she was named acting city librarian. The following year, she was appointed San Diego's city librarian, a position she held for 25 years. During her tenure as city librarian, the library system expanded with the creation of a new main library in 1955, and the addition of several branch libraries. She established the Serra Cooperative Library System that increased efficiency of interlibrary loans. Previously, library patrons only could check books out of the agency (city, county, etc.) to which they belonged. With the creation of the cooperative library system, patrons could borrow books from libraries throughout San Diego and Imperial counties. She was also the driving force behind the construction of San Diego's central library building in the 1950s. In 1983 she wrote a centennial history of the San Diego library system, Turning the Pages: San Diego Public Library History, 1882–1982.

== World War II and the internment of Japanese American children ==
When the United States became involved in World War II, many families of Japanese descent were moved from San Diego and other West Coast cities to internment camps in Arizona and other inland locations. Many of these Japanese-American children were patrons of the library. Breed noticed that before the children were sent to the camps, their behavior and manners had changed; the formerly outgoing and enthusiastic learners had become sullen and withdrawn. When the day came for the children's departure, many of them came to the library to return their library cards and to say goodbye to Breed. She gave the children self-addressed stamped postcards and told them to write to her and to tell her what they needed. When the children wrote, she responded and sent them not only reading materials but personal items such as soap and toothbrushes as well. Many of her former library patrons were sent to the Poston War Relocation Center internment camp in Arizona, where she visited them multiple times.

Breed was an outspoken opponent of Executive Order 9066, the internment policy instituted by President Franklin Roosevelt in February 1942. She wrote to many members of Congress and wrote two published articles about the unfair treatment of the children and the other Japanese Americans placed in internment camps. "All but Blind" appeared in Library Journal in 1943, and "Americans with the Wrong Ancestors" appeared in The Horn Book Magazine the same year. She also wrote letters requesting that college-age students from the internment camps be allowed to attend school in the Midwest, and sent requests to reunite some of the fathers who were separated from their families because they had been deemed to be "security risks."

Breed received more than 250 letters and postcards from the children during the time they were interned. One of the most prized gifts she received during this time was a carving of her name in manzanita wood that one of the children had created using the sharp end of a bed spring.

== Post-war recognition ==
In 1955, Breed was named "San Diego Woman of the Year" by the San Diego Women's Service Council. In 1991, she was honored at the Poston Camp III reunion held in San Diego. In 1993 she received a commendation from President Bill Clinton.

In 1993, she gave the letters and artifacts she had saved to one of her former pen pals, Elizabeth (Kikuchi) Yamada, a retired high school English teacher. Yamada donated them to the Japanese American National Museum, in 1993. which featured them in an exhibit called "Dear Miss Breed: Letters from Camp" . and then made them part of the museum's permanent collection.

The Smithsonian Institution incorporated four of the "Dear Miss Breed" letters into a lesson plan on the use of letters as primary historical documents. Her letters were also the basis for a 2006 book, Dear Miss Breed: True Stories of the Japanese American Incarceration during World War II and a Librarian Who Made a Difference, by Joanne Oppenheim.

In 2007, Breed was inducted into the San Diego Women's Hall of Fame in the Cultural Competent Bridge Builder category. In 2014, Clara Breed was inducted into the California Library Hall of Fame by the California Library Association.
