= Library Bill of Rights =

The Library Bill of Rights is the American Library Association's statement expressing the rights of library users to intellectual freedom and the expectations the association places on libraries to support those rights. The Association's Council has adopted a number of interpretations of the document applying it to various library policies.

== The Library Bill of Rights ==
The Library Bill of Rights was adopted by the American Library Association Council on June 19, 1939. It was amended in 1944, 1948, 1961, 1967, and 1980. The inclusion of 'age' was reaffirmed in 1996. ALA added a seventh article addressing privacy in 2019. The document currently reads:

I. Books and other library resources should be provided for the interest, information, and enlightenment of all people of the community the library serves. Materials should not be excluded because of the origin, background, or views of those contributing to their creation.

II. Libraries should provide materials and information presenting all points of view on current and historical issues. Materials should not be proscribed or removed because of partisan or doctrinal disapproval.

III. Libraries should challenge censorship in the fulfillment of their responsibility to provide information and enlightenment.

IV. Libraries should cooperate with all persons and groups concerned with resisting abridgment of free expression and free access to ideas.

V. A person's right to use a library should not be denied or abridged because of origin, age, background, or views.

VI. Libraries which make exhibit spaces and meeting rooms available to the public they serve should make such facilities available on an equitable basis, regardless of the beliefs or affiliations of individuals or groups requesting their use.

VII. All people, regardless of origin, age, background, or views, possess a right to privacy and confidentiality in their library use. Libraries should advocate for, educate about, and protect people’s privacy, safeguarding all library use data, including personally identifiable information.

While the Library Bill of Rights itself is concise and unambiguous in nature, the American Library Association provides additional documentation referred to as the Interpretations of the Library Bill of Rights, which elaborates on the application of these principles in relation to specific library practices. The additional documentation covers several specific issues: Access for Children and Young Adults to Nonprint Materials, Access to Digital Information, Services, and Networks, Access to Library Resources and Services for Minors, Access to Library Resources and Services Regardless of Sex, Gender Identity, Gender Expression, or Sexual Orientation, Access to Resources and Services in the School Library, Advocating for Intellectual Freedom, Challenged Resources, Diversity in Collection Development, Economic Barriers to Information Access, Equity, Diversity, Inclusion, Evaluating Library Collections, Exhibit Spaces and Bulletin Boards, Expurgation of Library Materials, Internet Filtering, Intellectual Freedom Principles for Academic Libraries, Labeling Systems, Library-Initiated Programs as a Resource, Meeting Rooms, Minors and Internet Activity, Politics in American Libraries, Prisoners Right to Read, Privacy, Rating Systems, Religion in American Libraries, Restricted Access to Library Materials, Services to People with Disabilities, The Universal Right to Free Expression, User-Generated Content in Library Discovery Systems, and Visual and Performing Arts in Libraries.

== History of the original bill ==
Originally written by Forrest Spaulding, director of the Des Moines Public Library, in 1938, the Library Bill of Rights was adopted by the American Library Association in 1939, and has been revised several times since. Latham has noted that the Chicago Public Library adopted an intellectual freedom policy in April 1936 in response to challenges from Polish and Russian communities about the Foreign Language Department collection policies suggesting that the value of intellectual freedom was on the table in librarianship discussion before 1938. The original adoption of the Library Bill of Rights was introduced with the statement, "Today indications in many parts of the world point to growing intolerance, suppression of free speech, and censorship affecting the rights of minorities and individuals," a reference to the emergence of totalitarian states during that time.

== History of revisions ==
=== Cold War ===
During the Cold War period, the Library Bill of Rights supported opponents of censorship of materials interpreted as communist propaganda. In 1948, the association adopted a major revision of the document, which strengthened it significantly to address the new wave of censorship attempts that marked the beginning of the Second Red Scare, better known as McCarthyism, and was subsequently attacked in newspapers as "leftist," a "red front," and a "Communist organization."

=== Race, religion, national origin and political views ===
An amendment to the Library Bill of Rights was passed in 1961 that made clear that an individual's library use should not be denied or abridged because of race, religion, national origin, or political views. Some communities decided to close their doors rather than desegregate.

=== Language revisions and age ===
A 1967 revision shortened the document and removed rhetorical flourishes, also removing the qualification "of sound factual authority," which it was felt could have been used to justify censorship; also, "age" (along with background, origin, and views) was added to the attributes that should not be a basis for denying access to information. The document was revised again in 1980.

In 1996, the American Library Association reaffirmed the inclusion of age as an attribute that should not be the basis for denying access to information. This occurred after the American Library Trustee Association (ALTA) brought a request for this to the ALA Council.

== Criticism ==
Shirley Wiegand, professor emeritus of law at Marquette University, asserts that the Library Bill of Rights uses rhetoric disconnected from the legal understanding of "rights." "Bills of Rights", and "rights" themselves, are in this understanding legally enforceable and backed by well-developed arguments. The Library Bill of Rights has no such force or backing, because it is simply a statement of principles. Wiegand argues that the Library Bill of Rights (and the accompanying rhetoric) needs to be supplanted by a code well-grounded in the case law and language of the First Amendment and its accompanying legal principles. Something similar to the Library Bill of Rights could be retained as an accompanying "aspirational creed", such as a revised form of the ALA Code of Ethics, but it would need to provide more practical guidance.

David Woolwine of Hofstra University has criticized the philosophical underpinnings of the Library Bill of Rights, specifically objecting to the use of utilitarianism and "rights discourse" in defense of the principles. The "moral calculus" of the utilitarian argument that free access of information produces the greatest good for the greatest number can also be used to argue in support of restrictions for the purposes of safety and national security. Rights discourse relies on the assertion of rights with minimal referencing, while neglecting detailed argumentation. Woolwine asserts that utilitarianism and rights discourse need to be replaced by a synthesis of modern and post-modern philosophy to coherently and soundly justify the principles of the Library Bill of Rights.

Wayne A. Wiegand, library historian, and retired Professor of Library and Information Studies and American Studies at Florida State University, expanded on his as well as his spouse's earlier work concerning the Library Bill of Rights, asserting that it has principally been a tool Librarianship has used to control the narrative surrounding libraries and their defense of intellectual freedom without actual legal accountability for those principles. This view, Wiegand argues, is evidenced by specific historical contradictions within the profession since the adoption of the Library Bill of Rights such as the controversy around the legacy of Melvil Dewey and the renaming of the ALA Medal of Excellence, the lack of ALA support for civil rights protestors following the Alexandria Library sit-in despite the then-recent adoption of the Library Bill of Rights by the ALA, lack of support from the ALA for librarians working against the ban of materials targeted by the California Senate Factfinding Subcommittee on Un-American Activities in the 1950s, and others, before concluding that the profession and its organizing bodies must have a reconciliation with this history before more meaningful frameworks for library rights and their protection can be produced.
