= Connecticut Four =

Librarians who challenged the constitutional validity of National Security Letters

The Connecticut Four are librarians who filed a lawsuit known as Doe v. Gonzales, challenging the constitutional validity of National Security Letters (NSL) issued by the Federal Bureau of Investigation (FBI) under the USA PATRIOT Act.

In 2005 the Library Connection, a consortium of libraries sharing a common computer database, received a National Security Letter demanding that the "libraries in the Library Connection network identify patrons who had used library computers online at a specific time one year earlier." Section 505 of the PATRIOT Act forbids recipients from telling anyone about receiving such a demand.

George Christian, executive director of Library Connection, and three members of the executive committee of the board engaged the American Civil Liberties Union (ACLU) to represent them in resisting the demand. Because of the gag order, all four plaintiffs were identified in the lawsuit as either John Doe or Jane Doe.

The Connecticut Four also challenged the validity of the gag order. For almost a year the ACLU fought to lift the gag order, challenging the government's power under Section 505 to silence four citizens who wished to contribute to public debate on the PATRIOT Act.

In May 2006, the government finally gave up its legal battle to maintain the gag order. On June 26, 2006, the ACLU announced that, after dropping its defense of the gag provision accompanying the NSL request, the FBI abandoned the lawsuit entirely.

The Connecticut Four were honored by the American Library Association with the 2007 Paul Howard Award for Courage for their challenge to the National Security Letter and gag order provision of the USA PATRIOT Act. The Connecticut Four met on September 28, 2016 for the first time since 2006 when the group spoke out against the excess demands made of the librarians by the FBI under the authority of the Patriot Act. The members of the Connecticut Four have also spoken out individually on numerous occasions regarding the excesses of the Patriot Act. As of September 28, 2016, the Connecticut Four have reunited as a group in the civil liberties cause to protect the civil liberties of both librarians and library patrons.

== Members ==
- George Christian, executive director of Library Connection
- Peter Chase, vice president of Library Connection, former director of the Plainville (CT) Public Library, and former chairman of the Connecticut Library Association's Intellectual Freedom Committee
- Barbara Bailey, president of Library Connection and director of the Welles–Turner Memorial Library in Glastonbury, Connecticut
- Jan Nocek, secretary of Library Connection and director of the Portland (CT) Library.

== Response ==
In a summary of the actions of the Connecticut Four and their challenge to the USA PATRIOT Act, Jones (2009: 223) notes: "Librarians need to understand their country's legal balance between the protection of freedom of expression and the protection of national security. Many librarians believe that the interests of national security, important as they are, have become an excuse for chilling the freedom to read."
